= List of artificial intelligence companies =

Below is a list of notable companies that primarily focus on artificial intelligence (AI). Companies that simply make use of AI but have a different primary focus are not included.

== Americas ==
=== Canada ===
- BlueDot
- Cohere
- Element AI
- Maluuba
- Waabi

=== Mexico ===
- Yalo

=== United States ===
- AI Foundation
- AMD
- Anduril Industries
- Anysphere
- Anthropic
- Arria NLG
- Broadcom
- C3 AI
- Caper AI
- Cerebras
- Cerence
- Character.ai
- Cognition AI
- Colloquis
- Contextual AI
- Conversable
- CoreWeave
- Counsel AI
- Covariant
- Dataiku
- Databricks
- Decagon
- DeepMind
- EleutherAI
- ElevenLabs
- FarmWise
- Figure AI
- Forethought Technologies
- Glean Technologies
- Google AI
- Groq
- H2O.ai
- Hebbia
- HeyGen
- Hive
- Hugging Face
- Inflection AI
- Invisible Technologies
- K Health
- Liquid AI
- LangChain
- LlamaIndex
- Mercor
- Meta Superintelligence Labs
- Microsoft AI
- Midjourney, Inc.
- Nuro
- NVIDIA
- OpenAI
- OpenEvidence
- OpenRouter
- Oracle
- Otter.ai
- Owkin
- Perplexity AI
- Physical Intelligence Inc.
- Poolside AI
- Preamble
- Project Prometheus
- RAIC Labs
- Reflection AI
- Runway
- Safe Superintelligence Inc.
- SambaNova Systems
- SAS Institute
- Scale AI
- Shield AI
- Snowflake
- SoundHound AI
- Sourcegraph
- Spectre AI
- Surge AI
- Thinking Machines Lab
- UiPath
- Undetectable.ai
- VAST Data
- VDURA
- Vultr
- Waymo
- Writer
- Writesonic
- xAI
- Zoox
- 1X Technologies

== Asia ==
=== China ===
- 01.AI
- 4Paradigm
- Alibaba
- Baichuan
- Baidu
- Biren Technology
- Black Sesame Technologies
- ByteDance
- Cambricon Technologies
- CloudWalk Technology
- DeepSeek
- Enflame
- Horizon Robotics
- Huawei
- iFlytek
- Iluvatar CoreX
- Megvii
- MetaX
- MiniMax
- ModelBest
- Momenta
- Moonshot AI
- Pony.ai
- SenseTime
- StepFun
- Tencent
- WeRide
- Xiao-i
- Xiaomi
- Yitu Technology
- Z.ai

=== Hong Kong ===
- Artisse AI

=== India ===
- Fractal Analytics
- Haptik
- NeuralGarage
- Ola Krutrim
- Sarvam AI

=== Israel ===
- AI21 Labs
- Aidoc
- Decart
- Hailo Technologies
- Lightricks
- Mobileye
- OrCam Technologies
- Qodo
- Tabnine

=== Japan ===
- Preferred Networks
- Sakana AI

=== Saudi Arabia ===
- Humain

=== Singapore ===
- Butterfly Effect
- Trax

=== South Korea ===
- Rebellions
- Upstage

=== United Arab Emirates ===
- G42

== Europe ==
=== France ===
- H Company
- LightOn
- Linagora
- Mistral AI

=== Germany ===
- Aleph Alpha
- DeepL
- Helsing

=== Italy ===
- Translated

=== Lithuania ===
- Neurotechnology

=== Netherlands ===
- Axelera AI
- Toloka

=== Portugal ===
- Unbabel

=== Sweden ===
- Furhat Robotics
- Lovable

=== Switzerland ===
- Art Recognition

=== Ukraine ===
- Respeecher

=== United Kingdom ===
- ARM Holdings
- ElevenLabs
- Google DeepMind
- Gradient Labs
- Isomorphic Labs
- Mind Foundry
- Peak
- Quantexa
- Recraft
- Stability AI
- Synthesia
- Wayve

== Oceania ==
=== Australia ===
- Appen
- BrainChip
- Leonardo.Ai

== See also ==
- List of AI-assisted software development tools
- List of AI software developed at universities
- List of artificial intelligence institutions
- List of AI journals
- List of artificial intelligence projects
- List of chatbots
- List of robotics companies
- List of self-driving car companies
- List of self-driving system suppliers
- List of university artificial intelligence research centers
- Lists of open-source artificial intelligence software
- Lists of companies
