= Artificial intelligence industry in the United States =

In 2025, the U.S. government allocated approximately $2 billion to integrate artificial intelligence (AI) and robotics in manufacturing and logistics. State governments supplemented this with funding for service robots, such as those deployed in warehouses to fulfill verbal commands for inventory management or in eldercare facilities to respond to residents' requests for assistance. Some funds were directed to defense, including lethal autonomous weapon and military robots.

In January 2025, Executive Order 14179 established an "AI Action Plan" to accelerate innovation and deployment of these technologies with the declared intent of "world domination" and "victory". Also in January 2025, Stargate LLC was formed as a joint venture of OpenAI, SoftBank, Oracle, and MGX, who announced plans to invest US$500 billion in AI infrastructure in the United States by 2029. The venture was formally announced by U.S. President Donald Trump on 21 January 2025, with SoftBank CEO Masayoshi Son appointed as chairman.

== Data centers ==
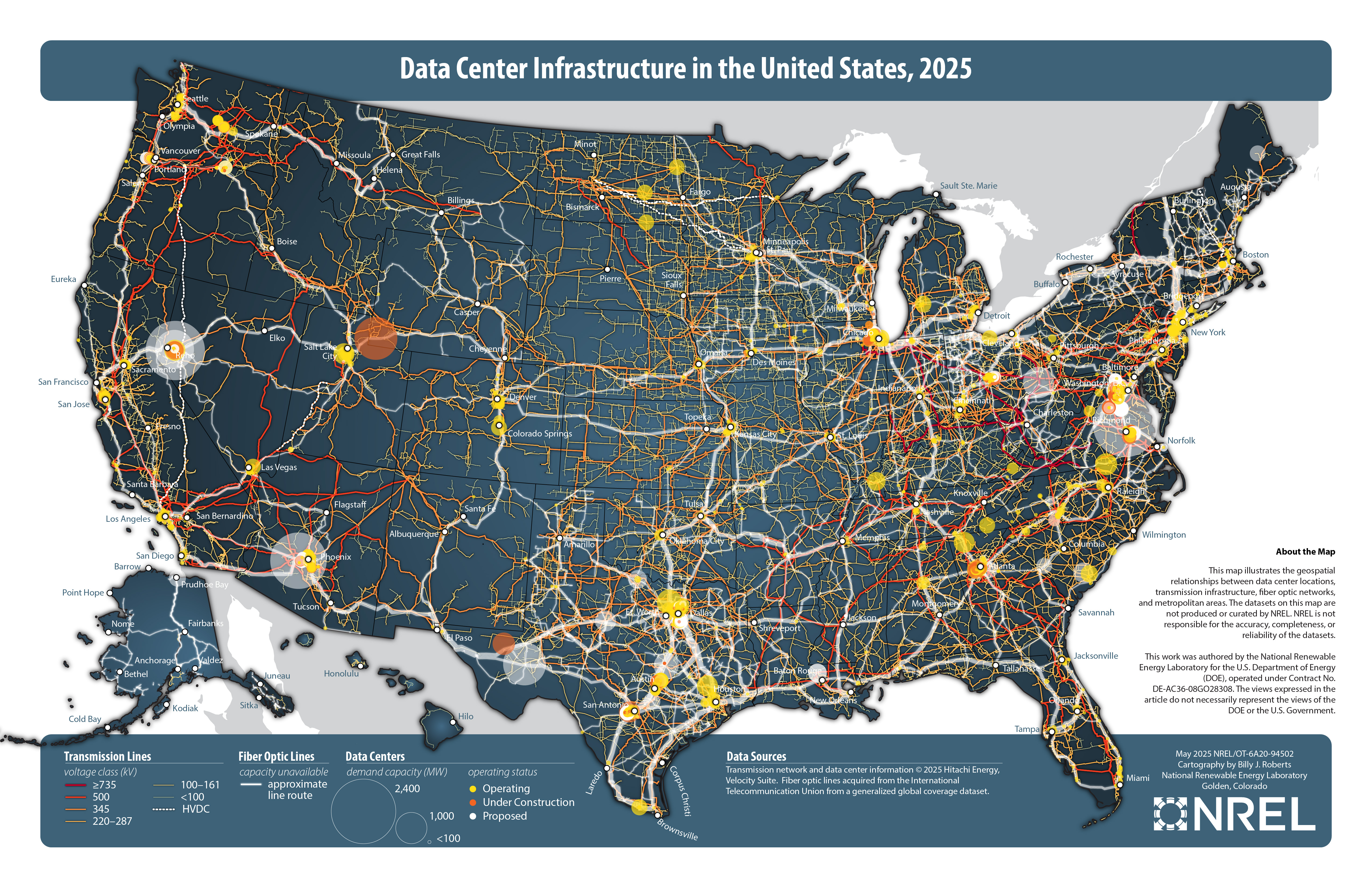
Data center infrastructure in the United States (2025)

In the United States, both the Biden administration and second Trump administration supported the construction of AI data centers. In January 2025, then-president Joe Biden signed an executive order for federal government agencies to support AI data centers on federal sites built by private companies, study their effect on energy prices, and encourage their use of renewable energy. In April 2025, the United States Department of Energy suggested 16 possible sites, including Los Alamos National Laboratory, Sandia National Laboratories and Oak Ridge National Laboratory. In its July 2025 AI Action Plan, the second Trump administration supported increased production of AI data centers.

Several US states have incentivized local data center construction. For example, in 2024, lawmakers in Michigan approved tax breaks for data center equipment and construction material. Some data center companies have also invested or promised to invest in the infrastructure of local communities.

In December 2025, Democratic senators Elizabeth Warren, Chris Van Hollen, and Richard Blumenthal wrote to seven technology companies (Google, Microsoft, Amazon, Meta, CoreWeave, Digital Realty, and Equinix) that they will investigate the effects of those companies' operations on consumer energy bills, highlighting AI data centers in particular. That same month, 25 Democratic lawmakers wrote to the inspector general of the United States Department of Commerce over possible conflict of interest concerns involving secretary of commerce Howard Lutnick and AI data centers. Lutnick met with a co-founder of Fermi, which proposed an AI data center project financed by Cantor Fitzgerald and Newmark Group.

AI Infrastructure Coalition (AIIC), an organization led by Brian O. Walsh, Kyrsten Sinema, and Garret Graves, has supported Trump's AI Action Plan, with Sinema becoming personally involved in a local meeting on an AI data center in Arizona. Venture capital firm Andreessen Horowitz, Big Tech companies (Google, Meta, Microsoft), telecommunications companies (Cisco, Corning Inc., Lumen Technologies), data center providers (Digital Realty, QTS), energy companies (Duke Energy, Entergy, ExxonMobil, NextEra Energy), and utility companies (PG&E, Pinnacle West Capital) are members of AIIC as of November 2025. AIIC has been supported by Hogan Lovells.

According to Goldman Sachs in 2025 an addition half million workers will be needed by 2030 to build the power infrastructure, which is acute because of AI data center build out.

In October 2026 Google says Gemini grew from 400 million to 1 billion users in three months.

== Regulation ==
The United States federal government and state governments have developed some regulation of artificial intelligence, including executive orders, federal laws, and state laws. Federal agencies have also developed some sector-specific regulations related to AI.

At the federal level, the Biden administration released an October 2023 executive order about AI safety and security, Executive Order 14110, with directives related to AI development and deployment. President Trump revoked that executive order in January 2025 and issued Executive Order 14179. In December 2025, President Trump signed Executive Order 14365, an executive order directing federal agencies to develop a unified national approach to AI policy, evaluate state AI laws for potential conflicts, challenge them through legal action, and condition certain federal funding on state compliance, while exempting state laws related to child safety, data center infrastructure, and state government procurement. In 2025, Congress passed legislation targeting AI-generated deepfakes, the TAKE IT DOWN Act.

Several U.S. states have enacted laws related to artificial intelligence. Some are already in effect, including in California. Other states have AI-related legislation coming into effect in 2026 and 2027. In 2025 and 2026, the Trump administration mentioned the patchwork nature of state legislation as a motivation for its push for unified national legislation regulating AI. The administration has criticized state lawmakers, threatened to sue states, and issued letters to discourage them from regulating AI companies and products; some states have continued to propose and enact related laws.

Discussions about regulating AI have included topics such as the timeliness of regulating AI, the nature of the federal regulatory framework to govern and promote AI, including what agency should lead, the regulatory and governing powers of that agency, and how to update regulations in the face of rapidly changing technology, as well as the roles of state governments and courts.

In the 2026 Global Index on Responsible AI, the United States scored 53.3, ahead of 81% of the 135 countries and jurisdictions assessed, 0.9 points below the Northern America average (54.2) and 1.2 points above the high-income average (52.1).

In November 2026, the US and nine allied countries have signed a declaration to collaborate on protecting the technologies and essential infrastructure that support artificial intelligence supply chains, according to the US State Department on Sunday evening. The countries involved are the United States, Australia, India, Israel, Japan, South Korea, Qatar, Singapore, the United Arab Emirates, and the United Kingdom.

== Term ==
On September 22, 2026, at the United Nations General Assembly, Trump said that all US federal agency documents would refer to artificial intelligence as super intelligence (or SI) due to the word artificial having a connotation of "fake". The U.S. State Department subsequently ordered its international diplomats to use the term super intelligence in place of artificial intelligence, and Trump later signed an executive order (EO 14434) on September 29 requiring all US federal agencies to use the new term, though the order is only binding on the US federal executive branch.

California governor Gavin Newsom signed a state executive order requiring state executive agencies to reject the use of super intelligence. Tech marketing experts predicted that the rebrand was unlikely to be adopted by the wider community due to the established meaning of superintelligence—a hypothetical AI system surpassing human intellect in all forms. Computer scientist Geoffrey Hinton said that Trump's use of the term shows he understands "almost nothing" about AI.

Trump's rebranding was adopted by tech executives Elon Musk (SpaceXSI), Jeff Bezos (Amazon), Satya Nadella (Microsoft), and Marc Benioff (Salesforce). On October 8, 2026, Trump posted on Truth Social that his administration would consider anyone who used the term artificial intelligence to be "the enemy". Tech executives' use of the term has been dismissed as a performative display of fealty to Trump.

== Companies ==
- AI Foundation
- AMD
- Anduril Industries
- Anysphere
- Anthropic
- Arria NLG
- Broadcom
- C3 AI
- Caper AI
- Cerebras
- Cerence
- Character.ai
- Cognition AI
- Colloquis
- Contextual AI
- Conversable
- CoreWeave
- Counsel AI
- Covariant
- Dataiku
- Databricks
- Decagon
- DeepMind
- EleutherAI
- ElevenLabs
- FarmWise
- Figure AI
- Forethought Technologies
- Glean Technologies
- Google AI
- Groq
- H2O.ai
- Hebbia
- HeyGen
- Hive
- Hugging Face
- Inflection AI
- Invisible Technologies
- K Health
- Liquid AI
- LangChain
- LlamaIndex
- Mercor
- Meta Superintelligence Labs
- Microsoft AI
- Midjourney, Inc.
- Nuro
- NVIDIA
- OpenAI
- OpenEvidence
- OpenRouter
- Oracle
- Otter.ai
- Owkin
- Perplexity AI
- Physical Intelligence Inc.
- Poolside AI
- Preamble
- Project Prometheus
- RAIC Labs
- Reflection AI
- Runway
- Safe Superintelligence Inc.
- SambaNova Systems
- SAS Institute
- Scale AI
- Shield AI
- Snowflake
- SoundHound AI
- Sourcegraph
- Spectre AI
- Surge AI
- Thinking Machines Lab
- UiPath
- Undetectable.ai
- VAST Data
- VDURA
- Vultr
- Waymo
- Writer
- Writesonic
- xAI
- Zoox
- 1X Technologies

== See also ==
- Artificial intelligence arms race § United States
- AI-generated content in American politics
- Use of artificial intelligence by the United States Department of Defense
- Science and technology in the United States
