= Research Science Institute =

American high school summer research program

The RSI Logo

The Research Science Institute (RSI) is an international summer research program for high school students. Sponsored by the Center for Excellence in Education (CEE) and hosted by the Massachusetts Institute of Technology (MIT) in Cambridge, Massachusetts, RSI brings together top STEM talent from around the world to conduct mentored scientific research. The six-week program is fully funded and cost-free for attendees, who participate during the summer before their final year of high school.

== History ==
The Research Science Institute was founded in 1984 by Admiral H.G. Rickover, known as the "Father of the Nuclear Navy," and CEE President Joann P. DiGennaro. It was originally called the "Rickover Science Institute" until the 1986 session, when it was given its current name. The program's original name is the source of the enduring nickname for RSI attendees: "Rickoids".

Although the institute has convened at various locations in its history—including concurrent bi-coastal programs in 1990 and 2004—it is most strongly associated with MIT, where it has been hosted nearly every summer. Over the decades, the program has cultivated a highly distinguished alumni network, with former Rickoids frequently returning as counselors, academic staff, and mentors. The program's Distinguished Lecture Series regularly features notable figures in STEM, including Nobel laureates, Fields Medalists, and prominent technology founders.

== Program ==
RSI is administered by CEE president Joann P. DiGennaro and executive vice president Maite P. Ballestero. Approximately 100 students (generally, two-thirds from the United States and one-third from other countries) are selected to participate in the six-week summer program. More than 4,000 applications are received each year, making RSI one of the most selective summer programs in the United States and the world.

The first week of RSI is composed of tutorials and seminars on contemporary research of interest by esteemed professors from top universities, many of whom are alumni. The next four weeks are centered on individual research projects through mentors in the Boston area, the majority being at labs at MIT, Harvard and other local universities. The last week is devoted to paper and presentation writing, following by the RSI Final Symposium, and encore presentations, which features the top 10 presentations decided by academic staff at RSI. After that, the top 5 presentations are determined by a panel of industry leaders in research and STEM.

The RSI Distinguished Lecture Series, which continues throughout the program, brings distinguished professors, scientists, and industry leaders in STEM, including a number of Nobel laureates, many of whom are RSI alumni, to speak to RSI students in evening lecture-style format. Since 2012, the RSI Distinguished Lecture Series has included Nobel Prize-winning physicist Wolfgang Ketterle, Nobel Prize-winning chemist Dudley Herschbach, Nobel Prize-winning geneticist Phillip Sharp, evolutionary biologist Pardis Sabeti, mathematician and chess master Noam Elkies, Akamai Technologies co-founder and CEO Tom Leighton, and mathematician Michael Sipser. RSI's staff is generally composed primarily, if not entirely, of alumni, with recent Rickoids (RSI alumni, from the Institute's original name) filling in as counselors and TAs and older alumni taking administrative, lecturing, or tutoring positions.

== Location ==
Though it has convened at various locations (including two years when the program was held concurrently on both coasts of the US: at UC San Diego and The George Washington University in 1990, and Caltech and MIT in 2004), the Institute is most often associated with MIT, where it has been held every summer since 1992, for various reasons including availability of local mentorships (with Massachusetts General Hospital, MIT, and Harvard Medical School all within a few minutes of central campus) and convenience of facilities, as well as at more distant locations such as Boston College and Tufts University. The program participants were housed in East Campus through 2003, Simmons Hall from 2004-2013, Maseeh Hall from 2014-2017, MacGregor House in 2018, and Baker House in 2019. In 2020 and 2021, however, RSI went fully virtual due to the COVID-19 pandemic. RSI returned to in-person in 2022, and participants were housed in Next House. In 2023 and 2024, participants were housed again in Baker House, and in Maseeh Hall for 2025 and 2026.

== Similar programs in other countries ==
In 2006, a new program, RSI-Fudan, (Chinese name: 未来科学家夏令营) was held at Fudan University in Shanghai, China for Chinese students. Thirty-five local students were selected from key high schools to participate in the program and the staff was composed with previous Rickoids and CEE/Fudan affiliates from both the U.S. and China. Five years later, in 2011, another new program, the Saudi Research Science Institute (SRSI) was founded and held for the first time at King Abdullah University of Science and Technology in Thuwal, Saudi Arabia. In the first year of SRSI, twenty-five scientifically talented students were selected and attended a six-week session modeled on RSI. The number of students was increased to 40 in 2012 and 2013 and to 45 in 2014. In the summer of 2015, the inaugural RSI-Tsinghua was held in Beijing. As an official cooperation between the CEE and Tsinghua University, this program held research experiences for 34 outstanding high school students in China. In Sweden, Research Academy for Young Scientists (RAYS) takes place annually for 21 incoming high school seniors who are most qualified in STEM.

In 2009, CEE established the Research Science Initiative India, a four-week program originally held at the Indian Institute of Technology Madras in Chennai, Tamil Nadu. As of 2025, a six-week program was hosted at the Indian Institute of Science in Bengaluru, Karnataka.

A similar program, Summer Research School in Mathematics and Informatics, has been running in Bulgaria since 2001. It is intended for high school students with profound interests in mathematics, informatics (computer science) and IT. At first, the program was attended each year by 40 Bulgarian students but now accepts international students. In 2016 the Summer Research School was attended by 50 students, of whom 9 were international. The program is organized by the High School Student Institute of Mathematics and Informatics.

The Science Research Programme in Singapore was modeled after RSI.

== Alumni ==
=== Academia and research ===
Computer security researcher Brian LaMacchia attended RSI in 1985. American computer scientist Michael Mitzenmacher and Indian-American string theorist Shamit Kachru attended RSI in 1986. American mathematician Christopher Skinner attended RSI in 1988. Fields Medalist Terence Tao and Indian mathematician Kannan Soundararajan attended RSI in 1989. American geneticist David Reich and Taiwanese-American chemist Alice Ting attended RSI in 1991. Harvard University mathematician Lauren Williams attended RSI in 1994. American physicist Jeremy England attended RSI in 1998. Optogenetics and CRISPR gene editing pioneer Feng Zhang and machine learning researcher Percy Liang attended RSI in 1999. Four-time Putnam Fellow and current Stanford economics professor Gabriel Carroll attended RSI in 2000. American astrophysicist Henry Lin attended RSI in 2012.

=== Business and technology ===
ActBlue was founded by two 1994 RSI participants, Benjamin Rahn and Matt DeBergalis. Pinterest co-founder Ben Silbermann attended RSI in 1998. Ramp co-founder Karim Atiyeh attended RSI in 2006. Benchling co-founder Ashu Singhal attended RSI in 2007. Suno co-founder Martin Camacho attended RSI in 2009. Forethought Technologies co-founder Sami Ghoche attended RSI in 2011. Perplexity AI co-founder Johnny Ho attended RSI in 2012. Decagon co-founder Jesse Zhang attended RSI in 2014. Wispr Flow co-founder Sahaj Garg attended RSI in 2015. Cursor co-founder Michael Truell attended RSI in 2017.

=== Government and politics ===
Evanston, Illinois mayor Daniel Biss attended RSI in 1994.

As of 2026, 207 finalists, 754 semifinalists, and 12 1st-place winners in the Regeneron Science Talent Search have been RSI alumni. In the Siemens Competition, 259 finalists and semifinalists, and three 1st-place winners have been RSI alumni. 15 Rhodes Scholars and 16 Marshall Scholars have been RSI alumni.

Here is the complete list of "Rickoid of the Year" winners since the award's inception:

| Year | Name |
|---|---|
| 1984 | Kevin Murdock |
| 1985 | Karl Rumelhart |
| 1986 | Tess Hildebrand |
| 1987 | Dallas Wrege |
| 1988 | Peggy Hsia, Karl Wirth |
| 1989 | Jed Macosko |
| 1990 (UC San Diego) | Raga Ramachandran |
| 1990 (The George Washington University) | Oliver Rando |
| 1991 | Susan S. Lee |
| 1992 | Ravi Kamath |
| 1993 | Erin Lynch, Josh McDermott |
| 1994 | Daniel Biss |
| 1995 | Bruce Haggerty |
| 1996 | Jay Sengupta |
| 1997 | Sapan Shah |
| 1998 | Jeremy England |
| 1999 | Zackary Stone |
| 2000 | Nate Craig |
| 2001 | Sheel Ganatra |
| 2002 | Steve Byrnes |
| 2003 | Arup Sarma |
| 2004 (Caltech) | Johann Komander |
| 2004 (MIT) | Nick Semenkovich |
| 2005 | Huan Liu |
| 2006 | Dexian Lim |
| 2007 | Christina Chang, Paul Kominers |
| 2008 | Varoon Bashyakarla |
| 2009 | Anjali Balakrishnan |
| 2010 | Samih Kabalane |
| 2011 | Daniel Pollack |
| 2012 | Connor Duffy |
| 2013 | Tara Murty, Rajet Vatsa |
| 2014 | Kavish Ghandi |
| 2015 | David Zhao |
| 2016 | Kathy Liu, Joshua Zhou |
| 2017 | Syamantak Payra |
| 2018 | William Ellsworth, Matthew Tan |
| 2019 | Jaehyun (Joshua) Lee |
| 2020 | Eldar Urkumbayev |
| 2021 | Isabella Quan |
| 2022 | Apoorva Panidapu |
| 2023 | Minh Nguyen |
| 2024 | Amelie Chen |
| 2025 | Thanat (Munich) Limapichat |
| 2026 | Michael Luo |
