= William Wu =

William Wu may refer to:

- William F. Wu, Chinese-American author
- William Wu (entrepreneur), Australian entrepreneur
