= Moritz Baier-Lentz =

German-American AI and gaming investor (born 1986)

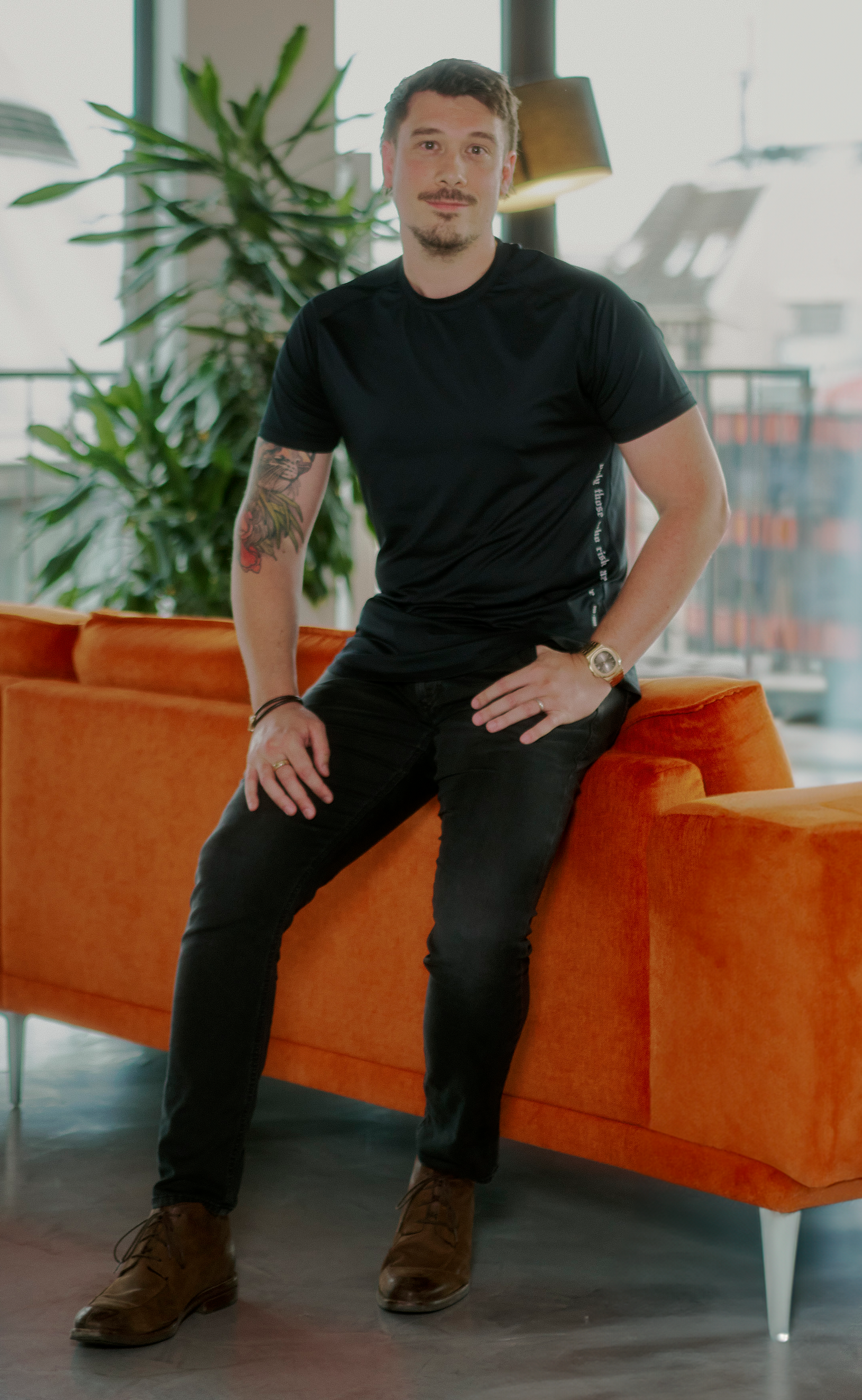
- Moritz Baier-Lentz in 2023
- Born: Moritz Baier; January 20, 1986 (age 40); Hanover, West Germany
- Education: Stanford University (M.B.A, M.A.)
- Employer(s): OpenAI, McKinsey & Company, TPG, World Economic Forum, Lightspeed Venture Partners, Goldman Sachs, IBM
- Spouse: Alissa Baier-Lentz
- Website: moritz.baier-lentz.com

Moritz Baier-Lentz (born January 20, 1986) is a German-American venture capitalist focused on 3D computer graphics and artificial intelligence, including foundation models for spatiotemporal reasoning (such as action policies and world models).

He is a private investor, and a current or former advisor to companies including Decart, Etched, McKinsey & Company, OpenAI, Palantir, Recursive, SpaceX, TPG, and the World Economic Forum.

Baier-Lentz previously worked as a partner and investment committee member at Lightspeed Venture Partners, leading the firm's gaming investments, as well as applications for generative media creation and agentic simulations in video games. Baier-Lentz was a vice president in the investment banking division of Goldman Sachs, where he founded and led the firm's gaming practice.

== Early life and education ==
Baier-Lentz grew up as a first-generation high school graduate in rural Germany and spent his teenage years competitively playing Blizzard Entertainment's multiplayer action role-playing game Diablo II. He used a combination of proceeds from virtual goods sales and German national academic merit scholarships from Studienstiftung and DAAD to help finance his undergraduate and graduate studies.

== Career ==
=== Investment banking ===
After starting his career as a data scientist at IBM, Baier-Lentz joined Goldman Sachs as an investment banker, and founded and led the firm's global gaming practice.

During his tenure as vice president, he advised gaming and technology corporations on over $300 billion in transaction volume across mergers and acquisitions, initial public offerings, venture capital, and other strategic transactions, including Dell's $67 billion acquisition of EMC and IBM's $34 billion purchase of Red Hat.

=== Venture capital ===
==== BITKRAFT Ventures ====
Baier-Lentz went on to become a partner and management team member at BITKRAFT Ventures, where he invested into entrepreneurs who had led the creation of video games like Fortnite, Call of Duty, League of Legends, Halo, Destiny, Overwatch, Valorant, Apex Legends, Sky, StarCraft II, and Warcraft III.

He scaled the firm to approximately $850 million in assets under management and to become the most active gaming lead investor in 2020, 2021, and 2022 before joining Lightspeed.

==== Lightspeed Venture Partners ====
After setting up Lightspeed's gaming and interactive media practice in early 2023, Baier-Lentz elevated the firm to become the largest set of funds with a dedicated sector focus (investing from over $6.5 billion of early- and growth-stage capital).

With Baier-Lentz as an early proponent of generative AI in video games, Lightspeed became the leading venture capital investor in gaming and interactive media globally in 2023 and 2024; having led rounds of aggregated $162 million and $252 million across both years, respectively.

==== General Intuition ====
Baier-Lentz is a founding member of General Intuition, a frontier research lab building action policies and world models trained on proprietary video game data. In 2025, the startup raised a $133.7M Seed round led by Khosla Ventures and General Catalyst, after rumored to be walking away from a $500 million acquisition offer from OpenAI in 2024.

In 2026, the Wall Street Journal first reported that General Intuition became the highest-valued independent world model startup at a $6 billion pre-money valuation, following two consecutive funding rounds including new investors Eric Schmidt, Jeff Bezos, Valor Equity Partners, Point72, and others.

=== Gaming industry ===
==== CEO Forum and Lightspeed Advisory Council ====
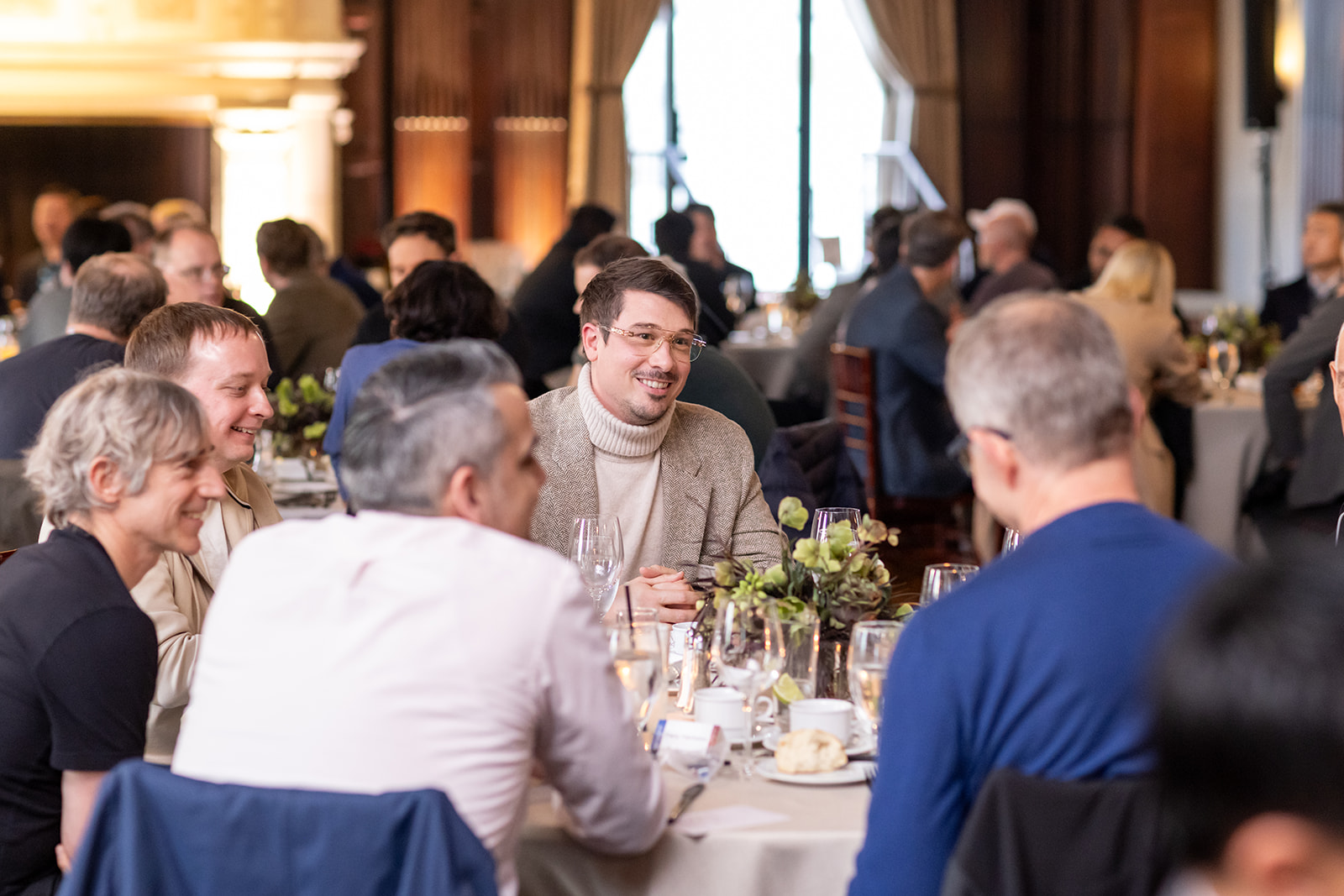
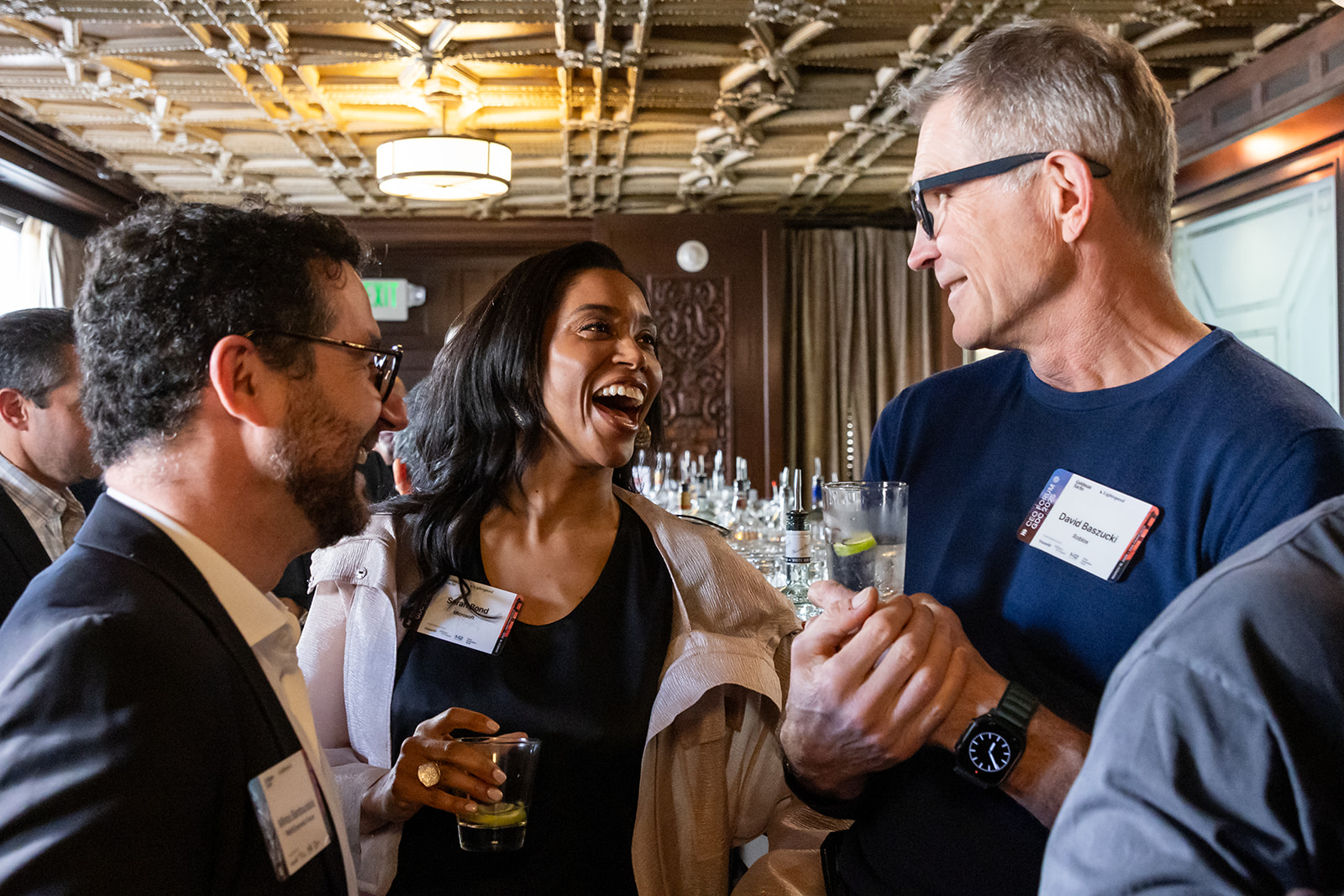
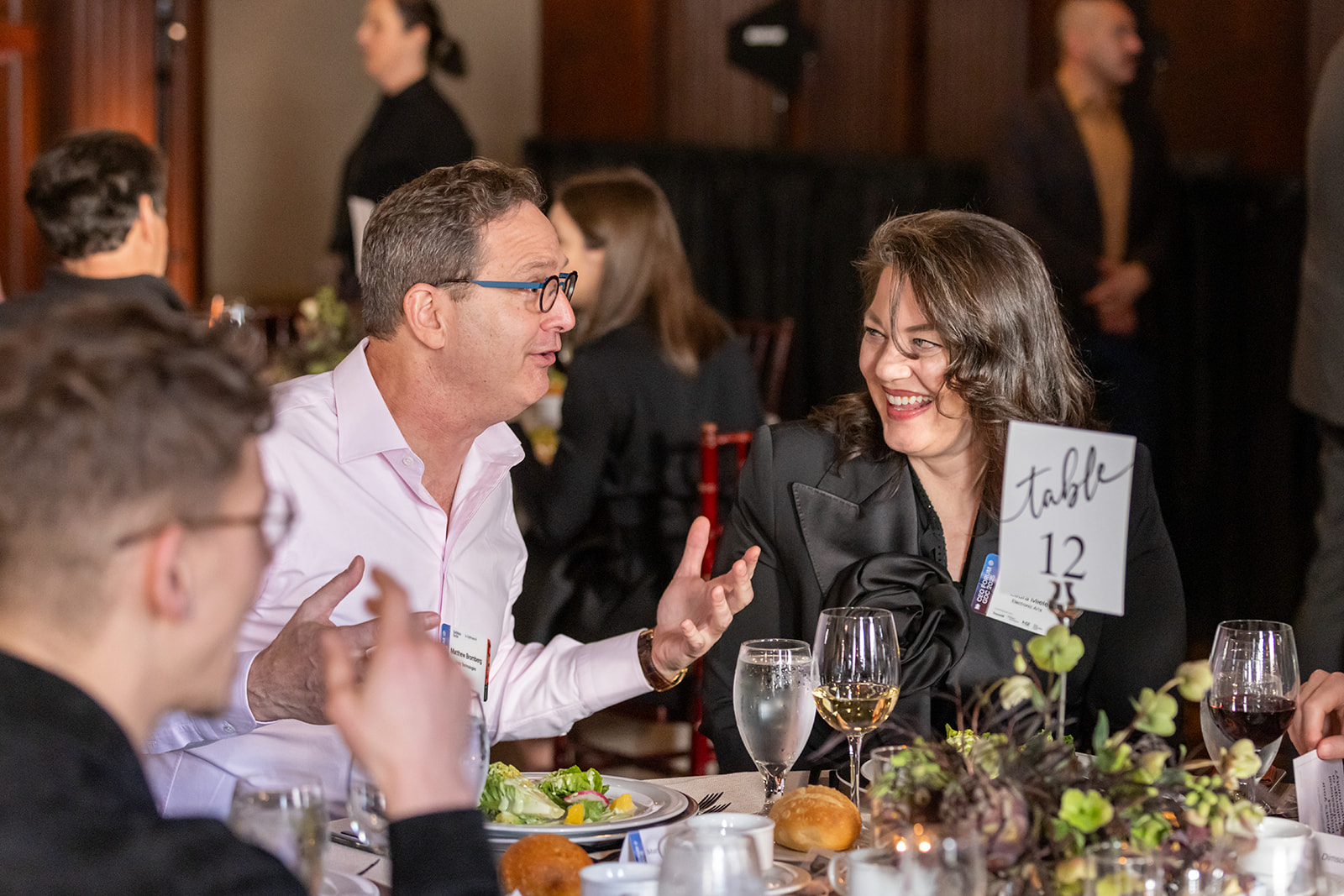
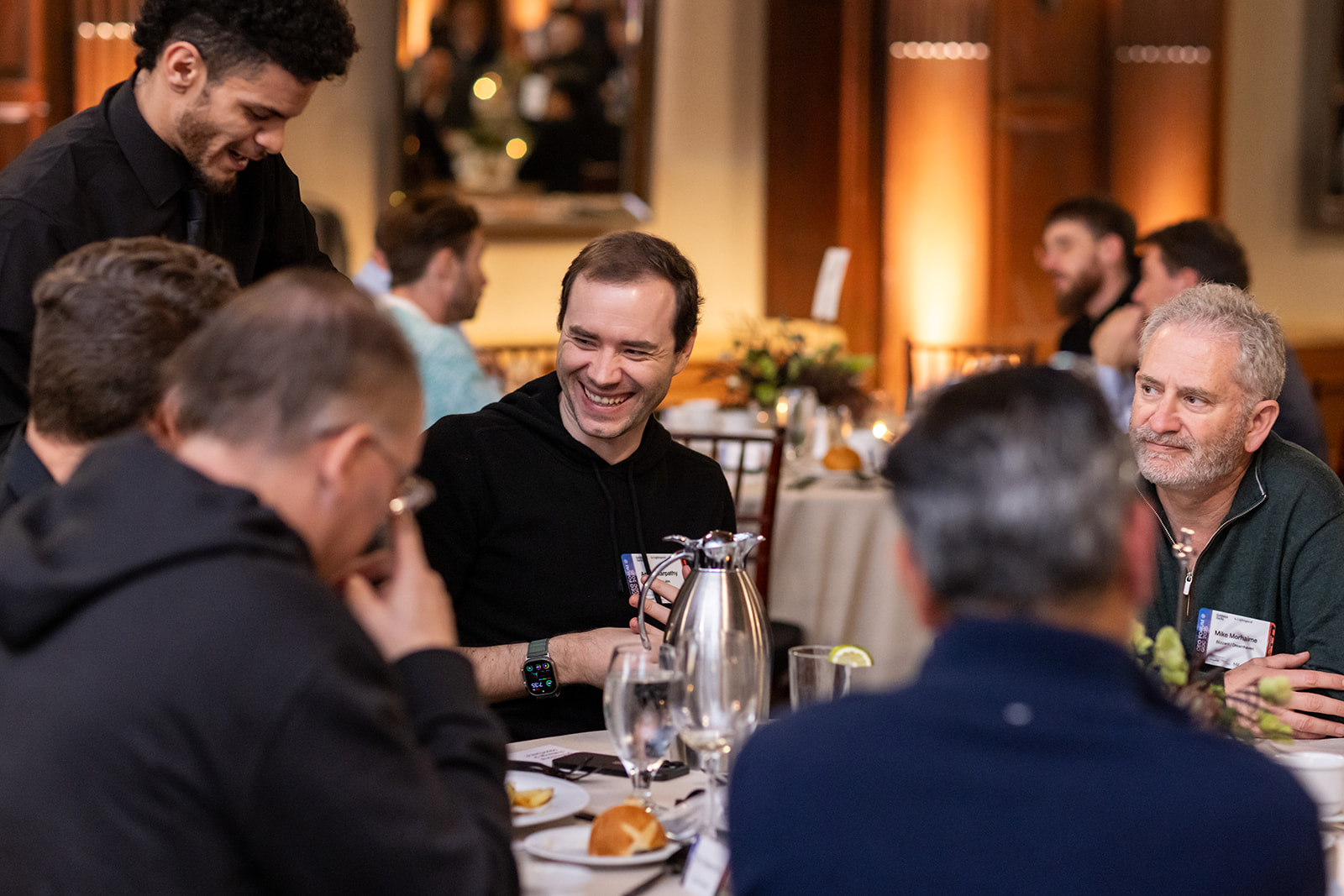
Baier-Lentz hosting the 5th Annual CEO Forum at GDC in 2025, including CEOs and Presidents of Blizzard, Discord, Electronic Arts, Epic Games, Microsoft Xbox, Riot Games, Roblox, Take-Two, Unity, and Zynga.

Baier-Lentz hosts the annual CEO Forum at the Game Developers Conference with Goldman Sachs, McKinsey & Company, Microsoft, and Sony—an "off-the-record gathering for the CEOs of the world's largest gaming and interactive media companies."

Attendees of the 2024 and 2025 conferences have included executives from companies such as Microsoft, Nintendo, Roblox, and Sony.

==== Game Theory ====
In June 2025, Baier-Lentz launched the video podcast series Game Theory: How Play Is Changing Everything in partnership with Goldman Sachs and McKinsey & Company, featuring commentary from founders, CEOs, and presidents in the gaming industry on how the concept of play has shaped consumer behavior and technological innovation.

Episode overview

Episode	Guest	Role & Company	Title
101	David Baszucki	Co-founder and CEO of Roblox	Play & the AI Revolution
102	Sarah Bond	Former President of Microsoft Xbox	Play & the Power of Anywhere
103	Walter Driver	Co-founder and Co-CEO Scopely	Play & the Learning Machine
104	Matthew Bromberg	President and CEO of Unity	Play & the Innovation Engine
105	John Hanke	Founder and CEO of Niantic	Play & the Real World
106	Strauss Zelnick	Chairman and CEO of Take-Two	Play & the Quest for Lasting Value

==== Game Changers ====
In partnership with Nasdaq, GamesBeat, and executive judges from the gaming and media industry, Baier-Lentz founded Game Changers, a yearly initiative to highlight 25 startups across gaming, interactive media, and artificial intelligence.

==== World Economic Forum ====
In his role as Young Global Leader and Davos delegate, Baier-Lentz advises the World Economic Forum on gaming, extended reality, governance aspects of artificial intelligence, and the convergence of frontier technologies.

==== Forbes ====
After originally making the Forbes 30 Under 30 list in the Finance category 2016, Baier-Lentz served as a judge for the Games category in 2024.

=== Speaking engagements ===
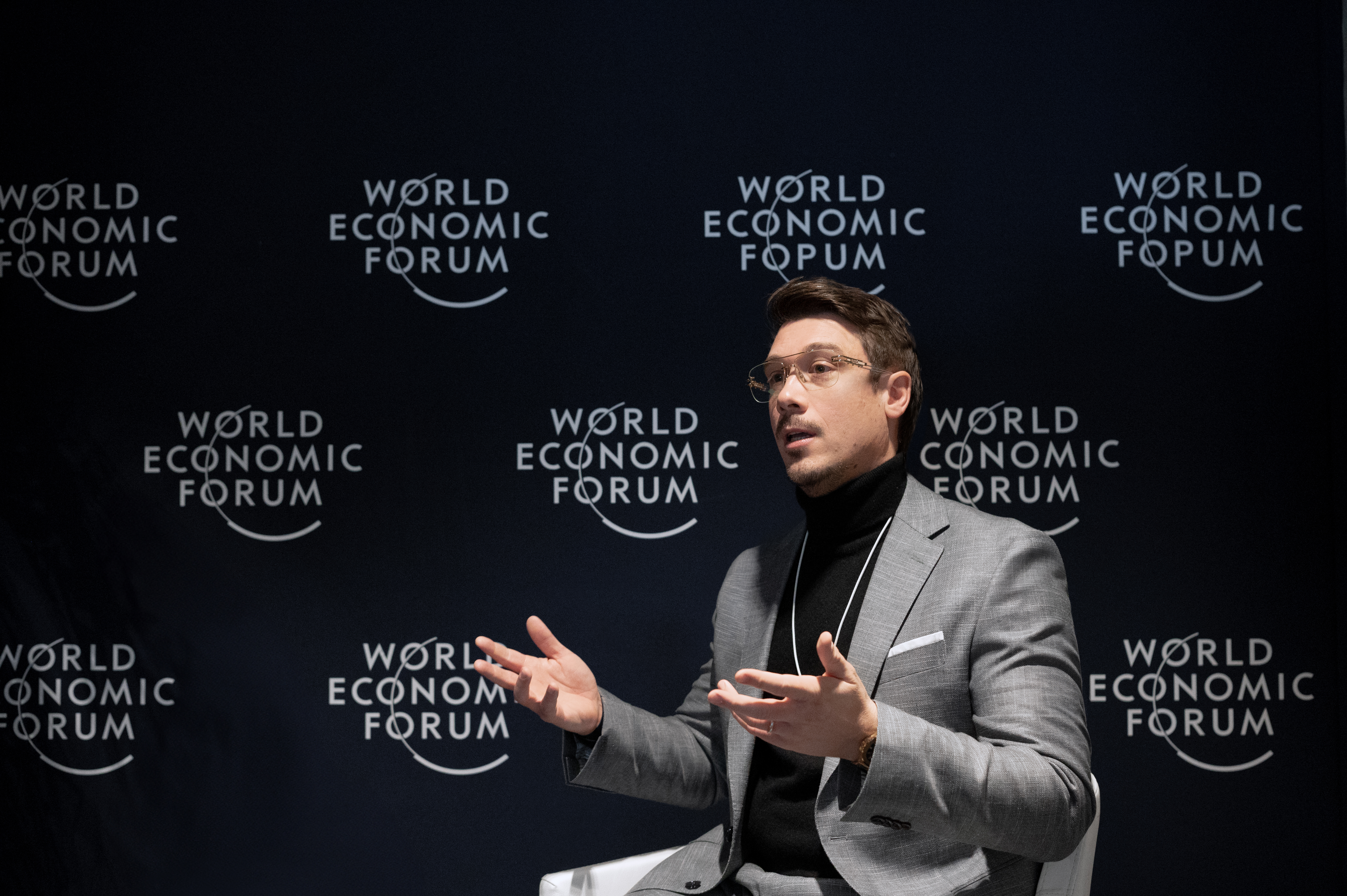
Baier-Lentz in 2024 at the 54th Annual Meeting of the World Economic Forum.

Baier-Lentz has been featured as a speaker at the World Economic Forum,, Goldman Sachs, Google, Nvidia GTC, Stanford University, Harvard University, Massachusetts Institute of Technology, Axios, South by Southwest, Slush,, the Game Developers Conference,, and the Paley Center for Media.

== Awards and professional memberships ==
In 2016 and 2017, Baier-Lentz was regarded by Forbes (U.S.) and Capital (Germany) as one of the most influential finance professionals in their 30 Under 30 and 40 Under 40 lists, respectively. In 2017, he joined the German-American Atlantik-Brücke and in 2023, he was recognized as a Young Global Leader by the World Economic Forum and invited to participate as a delegate in the 54th and 55th Annual Meeting in Davos. In 2026, he joined the Milken Institute's Young Leaders Circle.

Baier-Lentz holds an MBA and M.A. from Stanford University, and graduated as an Arjay Miller Scholar.

== Personal life ==
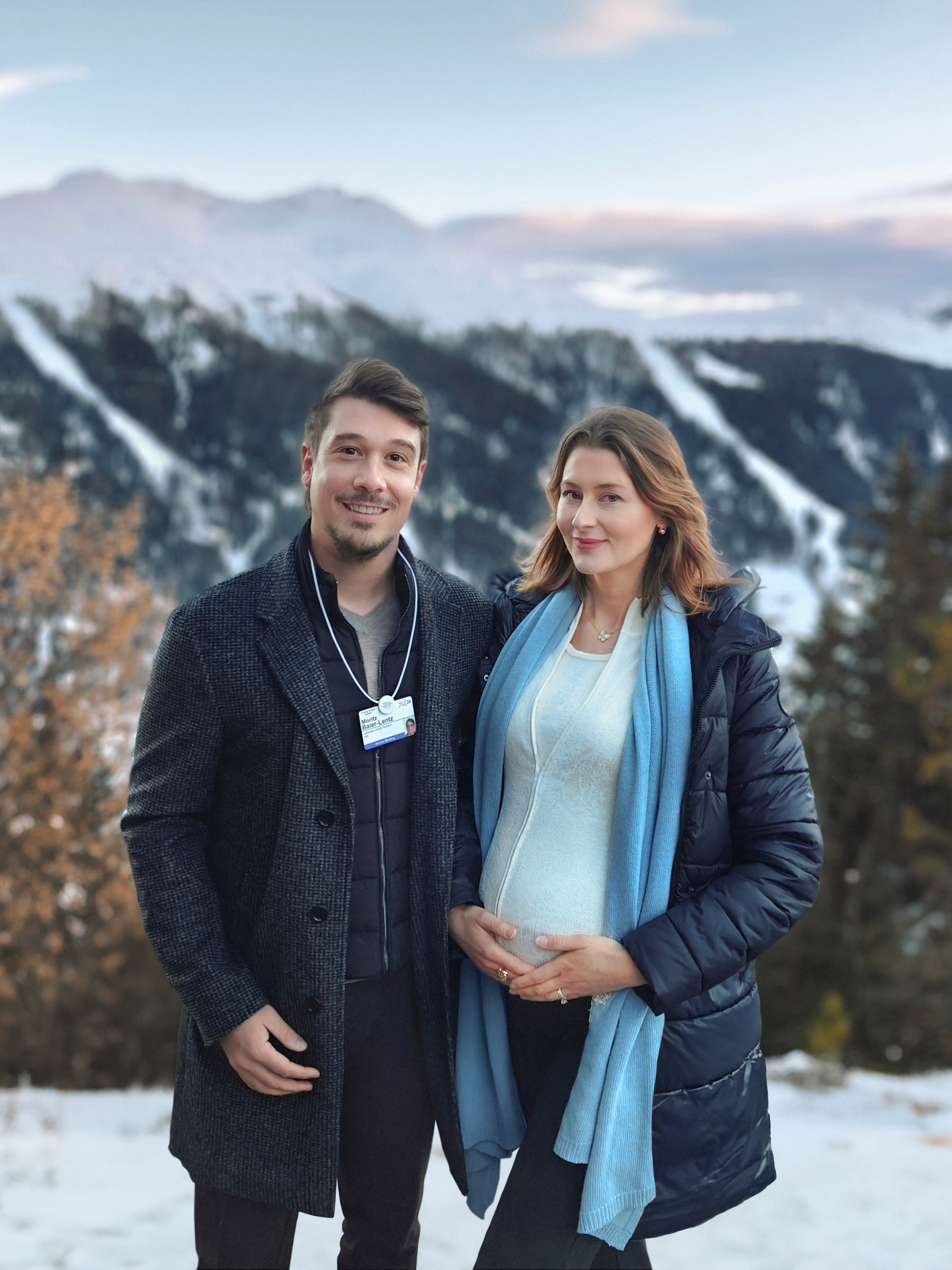
Baier-Lentz and wife Alissa at the Berghotel Schatzalp in 2024.

Baier-Lentz is an Ironman and ultramarathon runner, including the 251-kilometer long, self-sufficient Marathon des Sables and the World Marathon Challenge (7 marathons on 7 continents within 7 days).

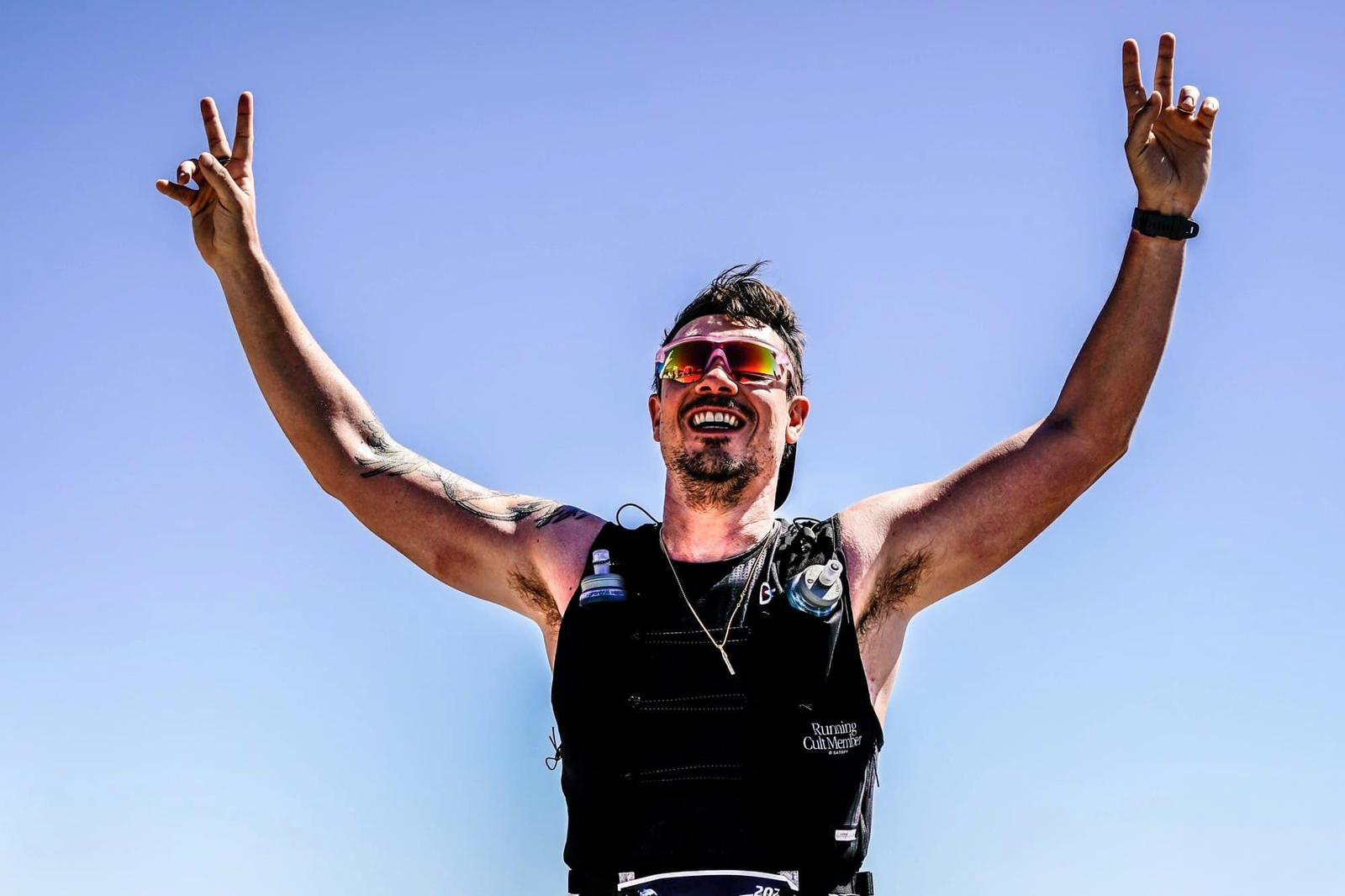
Baier-Lentz during the World Marathon Challenge 2023.
