= Artisse AI =

Personal photography application

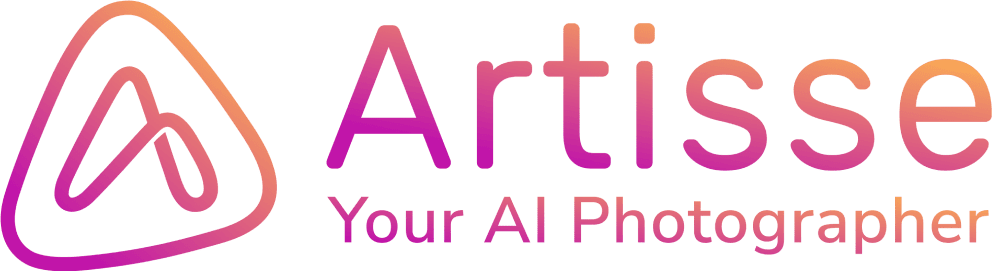
- Industry: Photo, AI
- Founded: 2022; 4 years ago
- Founder: William Wu
- Headquarters: Sheung Wan, Hong Kong
- Website: artisse.ai

Artisse AI is a Hong Kong-based technology company founded by William Wu. The company provides a mobile photography application using generative artificial intelligence to transform selfies into personalized images. The app allows users to visualize themselves in various scenarios, outfits, and hairstyles, and they can adjust lighting and ambiance to match their preferences. The app launched in 2023 across multiple markets, including the United States, United Kingdom, Japan, South Korea, Canada, and Australia. By January 2024, users had generated over 5 million images. That same month, the company secured $6.7 million in seed funding to support product development and marketing.

== History ==
Artisse was originally founded in South Korea in 2022 by William Wu. The early concept was connected to a virtual idol initiative developed in collaboration with a K-pop agency, intended to support Wu's blockchain gaming business. The project later evolved into a standalone AI photography application. The current version of the Artisse app was developed following the company's relocation to Hong Kong in 2022.

In January 2024, Artisse secured $6.7 million in seed funding, led by The London Fund. The investment was aimed at supporting product development, marketing, and user acquisition.

Artisse uses an AI algorithm to create hyperrealistic images from uploaded photos. The app generates personalized images by combining generative AI technology, a global pool of licensed talent, and finished art services.

The app works with individual users and businesses, offering professional-grade photos and advertisement images.

According to the British newspaper Evening Standard the company has developed the world's first and most advanced AI photographer. It captures 15–30 photos of the user and generates 2D images, placing them in various outfits and locations worldwide.

=== Catheron Gaming ===
Artisse AI originated from Catheon Gaming, a blockchain gaming and entertainment company founded in 2021 by William Wu. Catheon Gaming published more than 30 Web3 titles in its first year, developed a blockchain game distribution platform, and offered advisory services to external developers. In 2022, HSBC and KPMG listed Catheon Gaming among the "Top 10 Emerging Giants" in the Asia–Pacific region, selected from a pool of more than 6,000 startups.

In June 2023, Catheon Gaming was rebranded as Artisse Interactive, creating two divisions: Artisse Gaming, which continued blockchain and Web3 game development, and Artisse AI, which focused on generative photography technology.

== Technology ==
Artisse uses a proprietary generative AI model combined with open-source imaging frameworks and diffusion models. Users are prompted to upload between 15 and 30 personal images, allowing the AI to train a personalized model in 30 to 40 minutes. After training, the app generates new images based on either textual or visual prompts, with options to adjust elements such as clothing, hairstyles, lighting, and backgrounds.

To enhance realism, the app integrates augmented reality features and image refinement tools. The company has introduced features to address representation issues related to body shape and skin tone, although concerns persist about the ethical implications of altering personal traits.

== Products ==
=== Artisse mobile app ===
Available on iOS and Android platforms in 35 languages. Users initially receive 25 free images, after which the app adopts a subscription pricing model ranging from approximately $6 to $30 per month. By early 2024, the app reported around 4,000 paying subscribers out of more than 200,000 downloads.

=== Business and enterprise services ===
Artisse provides B2B solutions for creating marketing imagery and partners with agencies like Iconic Management to enable cost-effective virtual photoshoots. Additional features in development include virtual try-on capabilities and augmented reality integration for fashion retail.

== Reception ==
Media coverage has noted the app's photorealistic image outputs with some sources highlighting its ease of use. However, concerns have been raised regarding image authenticity, algorithmic biases, and the potential impact on professional photography and modeling.

Artisse has been widely covered by media outlets including TechCrunch, PetaPixel, Forbes Australia, and The Evening Standard. These publications discussed the app's integration of generative AI technology within the consumer photography space, its growing market influence, and its rapid adoption by users worldwide.

== See also ==
- List of artificial intelligence companies
