= DJI Osmo Pocket 3 =

Handheld gimbal camera made by DJI

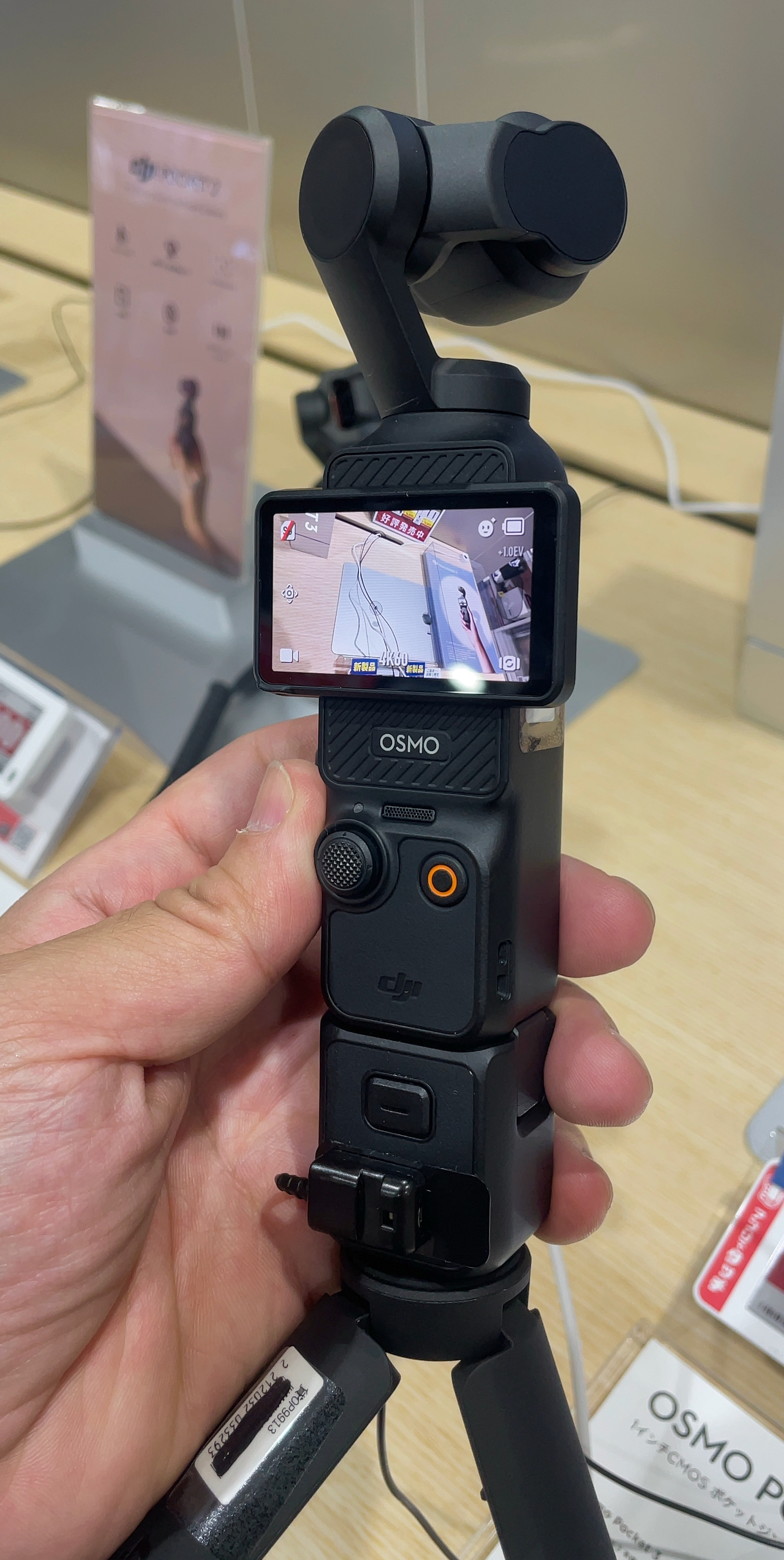
- Also known as: DJI Pocket 3
- Developer: DJI
- Manufacturer: DJI
- Product family: Osmo Pocket
- Type: Handheld gimbal camera
- Introductory price: US$519
- Storage: microSD card
- Display: 2-inch rotating touchscreen, 314 × 556 pixels
- Camera: 1-inch CMOS sensor, 9.4 megapixels
- Power: 1,300 mAh battery
- Weight: 179 g (6.3 oz)
- Predecessor: DJI Pocket 2
- Successor: DJI Osmo Pocket 4

The DJI Osmo Pocket 3, also called the DJI Pocket 3, is a handheld video camera with a built-in three-axis gimbal stabilizer, made by the Chinese technology company DJI. Released on 25 October 2023 as the third model in the Osmo Pocket line, it replaced the smaller sensors of earlier models with a 1-inch sensor and added a larger, rotating screen. Reviewers praised its video quality, low-light performance and subject tracking, and criticized its price, its still photos and the requirement to activate it through DJI's app. The camera was in short supply in 2024 and 2025, and its price in the United States rose from US$519 to about US$800 in 2025 because of tariffs. DJI released a successor, the Osmo Pocket 4, in April 2026.

== History ==
DJI released the original Osmo Pocket about five years before the Pocket 3, followed by the Pocket 2. Both earlier models sold for US$349 and used smaller sensors, of 1/2.3 inch and 1/1.7 inch respectively.

DJI announced the Pocket 3 and put it on sale on 25 October 2023 at US$519 (£489). A Creator Combo bundle, at US$669 (£619), added a DJI Mic 2 wireless microphone transmitter, a battery handle, a mini tripod and a carrying bag. The Verge called the starting price a large increase over the earlier models. A firmware update released in February 2025 added a Med-Tele mode, compensation for focus breathing, and 10-bit D-Log M recording in webcam mode.

In May 2024 The Verge noted that the camera could still be hard to find in some areas. In March 2025 Digital Camera World reported continuing shortages, along with unverified claims on Weibo that users of the social media platform Xiaohongshu had bought large quantities. DJI said demand had far exceeded its expectations. In the United States, PetaPixel reported in May 2025 that the price had risen to US$620 earlier in the year and then to US$800, which it attributed to tariffs, and that the camera had sold out at Amazon, B&H and DJI's own store.

In October 2025 The Verge reported that a camera sold in the US as the Xtra Muse was identical in hardware to the Pocket 3, citing FCC filings, app code and side-by-side tests. DJI did not deny a connection. After the Federal Communications Commission added DJI to its Covered List in December 2025, The Verge reported that Osmo cameras already sold would keep working.

DJI announced the Osmo Pocket 4 on 16 April 2026. It kept the Pocket 3's 1-inch sensor and 20 mm f/2 lens, added 4K recording at 240 frames per second and 107 GB of built-in storage, and was not initially sold in the United States because its authorization was pending.

== Design and specifications ==
The Pocket 3 has a 1-inch, 9.4-megapixel CMOS sensor behind a lens with a 20 mm equivalent focal length, mounted on a three-axis mechanical gimbal. It records video at up to 4K resolution at 120 frames per second and 1080p at 240 frames per second, with 10-bit D-Log M and HLG color profiles, and uses DJI's ActiveTrack 6.0 subject tracking. The 2-inch, 314 × 556-pixel touchscreen rotates 90 degrees to switch between landscape and portrait shooting, and vertical video is cropped to 3K.

The camera has three microphones and a built-in receiver for the DJI Mic 2 transmitter. It weighs 179 g and has a 1,300 mAh battery, which Engadget said gives about two hours of 4K recording. It has no internal storage and records to microSD cards.

== Reception ==
Steve Dent of Engadget wrote that the Pocket 3 might be the only vlogging camera many people need. He praised its low-light performance, autofocus and D-Log M dynamic range, and criticized its menus, vertical shake while walking, focus breathing, wide lens and still photos, calling the price its main drawback. David Schloss of PetaPixel recommended it for solo creators, praising its tracking and rotating screen and criticizing the mandatory app activation and the quality of its stills. Cameralabs rated it "Highly Recommended" and called it "the camera to beat" for pocket vlogging.

Amateur Photographer gave it four stars, citing its portrait-orientation shooting, and noted the lack of built-in storage and its price. Stuff also gave it four out of five, criticizing the forced registration and autofocus problems with busy backgrounds. Videomaker found its low-light video better than that of the GoPro Hero12 Black. In a 2024 opinion piece for The Verge, Quentyn Kennemer wrote that its video came close to that of full-frame mirrorless cameras, while noting its limited zoom, few professional settings and lack of waterproofing.
