= Think: act =

Publication title including books and magazines

think: act
- Editor: Torsten Oltmanns
- Categories: Business
- Frequency: 3-4 times per year
- Circulation: 20,000
- Publisher: Burkhard Schwenker
- First issue: December 2004
- Company: Roland Berger Strategy Consultants
- Language: English, German, Russian, Chinese, Polish
- Website: http://www.think-act.info/

think: act is a publication title created by Roland Berger Strategy Consultants. Since 2004, various kinds of publications for international leaders have been collected under the brand think: act. Among these are magazines, information brochures and books.

== think: act – the magazine ==
think: act was first published in December 2004. The magazine addresses decision makers in companies and is thus clearly focussed on B2B-relations. Three to four times each year, the magazine is published in English, German, Russian, Chinese and Polish. The 20,000 copies of each edition are sent to leading managers in 22 nations. The concept of the magazine is to address current management issues, as its aim is to achieve and maintain "thought leadership".

It is the aim of this publication to keep a high journalistic standard and to move Roland Berger as a brand into the background.

In the Handbuch Unternehmenskommunikation (Handbook of corporate communication), think: act is listed as a reference for B2B customer-magazines.

In 2005, 2006 and 2007, the magazine think: act was awarded the Best of Corporate Publishing (BCP) Award in the business area of "financial services / real estate / consulting". Recently, the magazine won the Mercury Award 2009 (Silver) as well as the Astrid Award 2010 (Honors) in the category "Executive Magazine".

== re: think CEO ==
The books of the re: think CEO-series are published by Roland Berger Strategy Consultants in cooperation with the German business magazine WirtschaftsWoche. The target market is managers. Every book is about 140 pages in length. The four present books deal with the topics strategy, handling of the media, green business and the European management model.

- Burkhard Schwenker: re: think CEO 01: Thinking strategically and managing boldly (abstract; in German), original title: Strategisch denken - Mutiger führen. BrunoMedia, Cologne 2008, ISBN 978-3-9811506-6-7
- Torsten Oltmanns: re: think CEO 02: Managers in the Media Trap (abstract; in German), original title: Manager in der Medienfalle. BrunoMedia, Cologne 2009, ISBN 978-3-9811506-7-4
- Torsten Henzelmann: re: think CEO 03: Success through Green Transformation (abstract; in German), original title: Erfolg durch Green Transformation. BrunoMedia, Cologne 2010, ISBN 978-3-9812730-7-6
- Burkhard Schwenker: re: think CEO 04: Europe shows the way – Pleading for a successful Management Model (abstract; in German), original title: Plädoyer für ein erfolgreiches Managementmodell. BrunoMedia, Cologne 2011, ISBN 978-3-9814012-6-4

== think: act CONTENT ==
In contrast to think: act magazine, think: act CONTENT strongly focuses on facts and addresses one specific topic in each issue. It is the aim of think: act CONTENT to help decision-makers in companies become capable of making decisions in each respective subject area. think: act CONTENT is the latest format of the think: act brand. Each issue of think: act CONTENT is available for download online.

== Additional formats ==
In addition, the book-series think: act BOOKS and re:think CEO, in which the partners of Roland Berger speak about their core-topics, belong to the think: act brand. Studies and research-reports are published in think: act Study. think: act BUSINESS is a topical spin-off of think: act magazine. As a CD-version of selected articles of the magazine, think: act audio is added to each issue of think: act.
