= Florent Krzakala =

French physicist and engineer

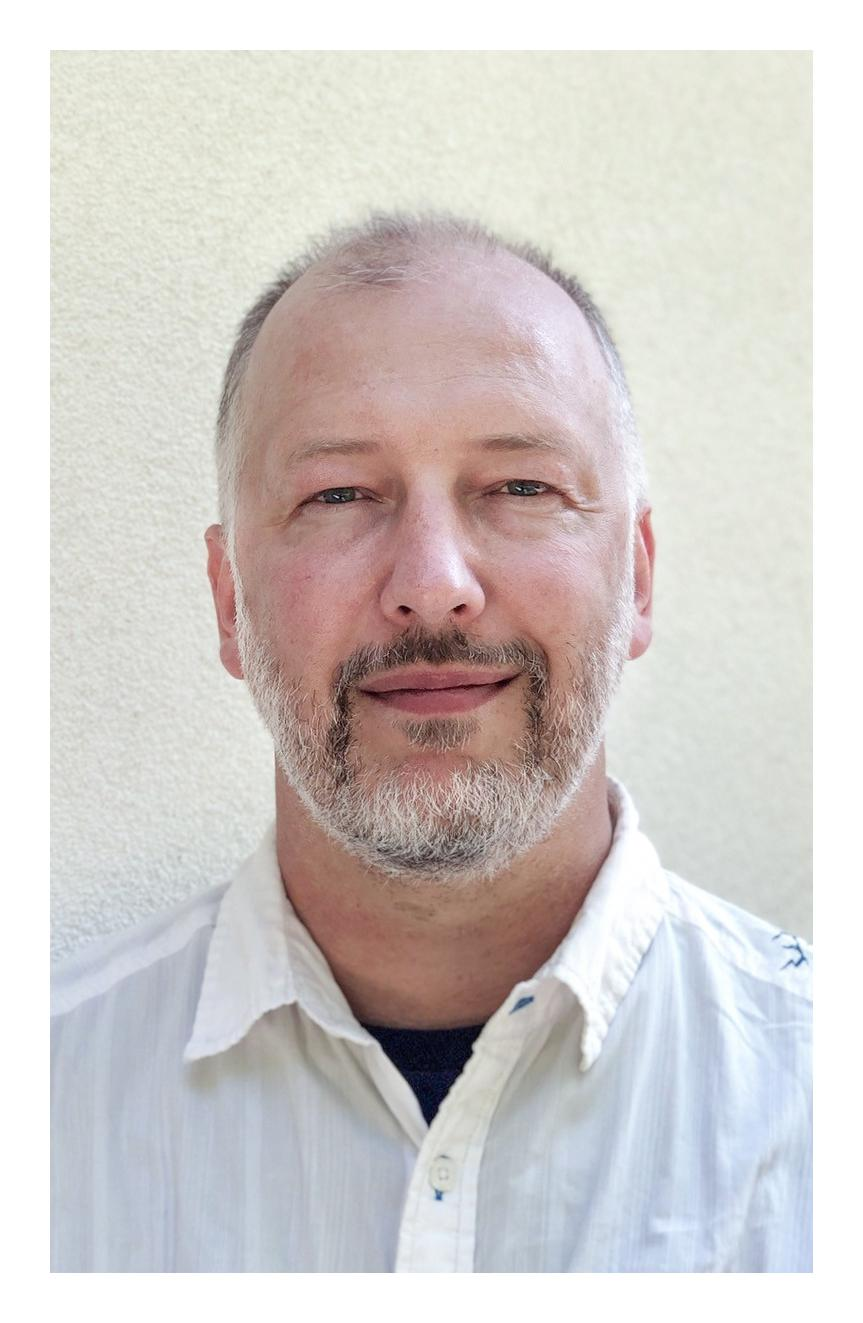
- Florent Krzakala in 2020
- Born: March 22, 1976 (age 50); Nancy, France
- Education: Aix-Marseille University, Pierre and Marie Curie University, Paris-Sud University
- Awards: Atos-Fourier 2018
- Scientific career
- Fields: Statistical physics, Machine learning, Computer science
- Workplaces: École Polytechnique Fédérale de Lausanne (EPFL)
- Thesis: Aspects géométriques et paysages d'énergies des verres de spins : étude d'un système désordonné et frustré en dimension finie (2002)
- Doctoral advisor: Prof. Olivier Martin
- Website: Official website

Florent Krzakala (born March 22, 1976 in Nancy, France) is a French physicist and applied mathematician, currently a professor at EPFL (École Polytechnique Fédérale de Lausanne). His research focuses on the resolution of theoretical problems in physics, computer science, machine learning, statistics and signal processing using mathematical tools inspired by the field of statistical physics.

== Education and career ==
Florent Krzakala grew up in Marseille, France, where he studied at the Lycée Saint-Exupéry and Aix-Marseille University, and then moved to Paris for his graduate studies. After a master's degree in particle physics, he switched field to statistical physics for his PhD, which he obtained in 2002 jointly from the Pierre and Marie Curie University and the Paris-Sud University under the supervision of Prof. Olivier Martin in the Laboratory of Theoretical Physics and Statistical Models in Orsay, where he also collaborated with Prof. Marc Mézard. His doctoral work focused on the thermodynamics of disordered systems and spin glasses.

He then moved to the Sapienza University of Rome as a postdoctoral researcher, where he studied various statistical physics topics such as glassy systems, Monte-Carlo simulation techniques, and out-of-equilibrium dynamics in the laboratory of Prof. Giorgio Parisi. In 2004, he was named associate professor at ESPCI Paris, in the laboratoire Gulliver. In 2013, he became full professor at the Pierre and Marie Curie University and the École Normale Supérieure in Paris, and joined the physics laboratory in Ecole Normale Supérieure.

In September 2020, he was appointed Full Professor of Electrical Engineering and of Physics at EPFL, where he founded the laboratoire IdePHICS.

== Research ==
Florent Krzakala heads the laboratory for Information, Learning and Physics (IdePHICS) at the School of Basic Sciences and the School of Engineering of EPFL.

Trained as a theoretical statistical physicist, Florent Krzakala studied problems involving complex assemblies of simple elementary components, especially in the context of spin glasses and disordered systems. His attention has then switched to computer sciences, statistics and applied mathematics, where conceptually similar problems often arise and can be solved with similar techniques. He has notably worked in random combinatorial optimization, coding and information theory, statistical inference, machine learning and compressed sensing. He is especially known for his work on the Stochastic block model, Quantum annealing and on phase transitions in satisfiability and colouring with the Cavity method. He also created with his colleagues the French startup LightOn.

== Recognition ==
Florent Krzakala was named a junior fellow of the Institut Universitaire de France in 2015. He received an ERC grant from the European Research Council for his work on compressed sensing in 2012, and an Advanced Grant from the Swiss National Science Foundation for his work on neural network in 2025. He received the Atos-Fourier price in 2018 Prix Atos - Joseph Fourier. He was the holder of the CFM chair in data-science in Ecole Normale Supérieure from 2016 to 2020. He is part of the "Physics of learning" Collaboration, funded by the Simons Foundation, that aims to elucidate fundamental scientific principles of learning and neural computation underlying modern artificial intelligence.

== Notable publications ==
- Krzakala, F.; Montanari, A.; Ricci-Tersenghi, F.; Semerjian, G.; Zdeborova, L. (2007). "Gibbs states and the set of solutions of random constraint satisfaction problems". Proceedings of the National Academy of Sciences. 104 (25): 10318–10323. arXiv:cond-mat/0612365. Bibcode:2007PNAS..10410318K. doi:10.1073/pnas.0703685104. PMC 1965511. PMID 17567754.
- Krzakala, F.; Moore, C.; Mossel, E.; Neeman, J.; Sly, A.; Zdeborova, L.; Zhang, P. (2013). "Spectral redemption in clustering sparse networks". Proceedings of the National Academy of Sciences. 110 (52): 20935–20940. arXiv:1306.5550. Bibcode:2013PNAS..11020935K. doi:10.1073/pnas.1312486110. PMC 3876200. PMID 24277835.
- Krzakala, Florent; Mézard, Marc; Sausset, Francois; Sun, Yifan; Zdeborová, Lenka (2012). "Probabilistic reconstruction in compressed sensing: Algorithms, phase diagrams, and threshold achieving matrices". Journal of Statistical Mechanics: Theory and Experiment. 2012 (8) P08009. arXiv:1206.3953. Bibcode:2012JSMTE..08..009K. doi:10.1088/1742-5468/2012/08/P08009. S2CID 17065297.
- Coja-Oghlan, Amin; Krzakala, Florent; Perkins, Will; Zdeborová, Lenka (2018). "Information-theoretic thresholds from the cavity method". Advances in Mathematics. 333: 694–795. arXiv:1611.00814. doi:10.1016/j.aim.2018.05.029. S2CID 199667600.
- Decelle, Aurelien; Krzakala, Florent; Moore, Cristopher; Zdeborová, Lenka (2011). "Asymptotic analysis of the stochastic block model for modular networks and its algorithmic applications". Physical Review E. 84 (6) 066106. arXiv:1109.3041. Bibcode:2011PhRvE..84f6106D. doi:10.1103/PhysRevE.84.066106. PMID 22304154. S2CID 15788070.
- Krzakala, F.; Martin, O. C. (2000). "Spin and Link Overlaps in Three-Dimensional Spin Glasses". Physical Review Letters. 85 (14): 3013–3016. arXiv:cond-mat/0002055. Bibcode:2000PhRvL..85.3013K. doi:10.1103/PhysRevLett.85.3013. PMID 11005991. S2CID 30264583.
- Krzakala, F.; Mézard, M.; Sausset, F.; Sun, Y. F.; Zdeborová, L. (2012). "Statistical-Physics-Based Reconstruction in Compressed Sensing". Physical Review X. 2 (2) 021005. arXiv:1109.4424. Bibcode:2012PhRvX...2b1005K. doi:10.1103/PhysRevX.2.021005. S2CID 8042351.
