= Torsten Oltmanns =

German manager, consultant and author (born 1964)

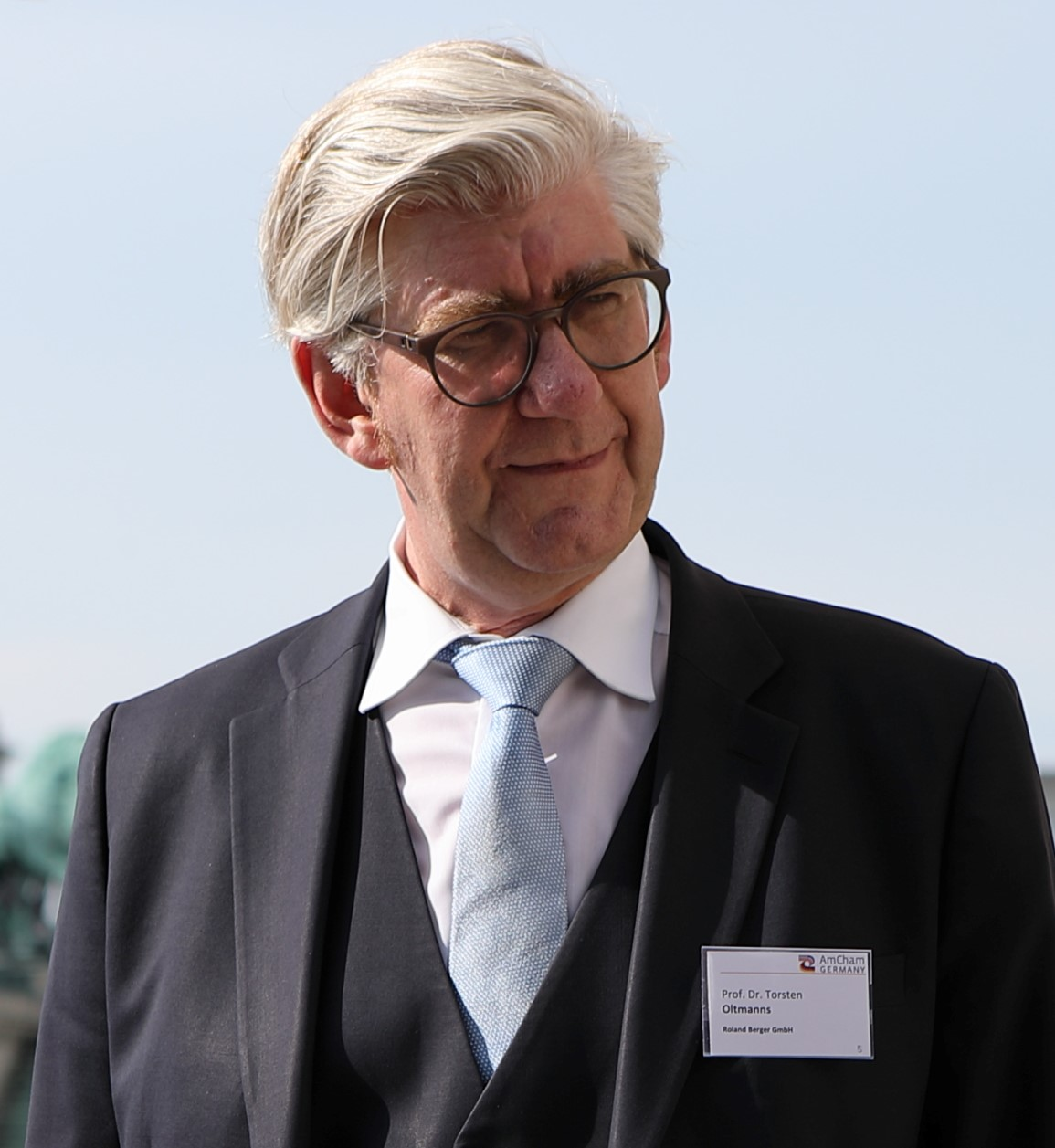
Torsten Oltmanns (2019)

Torsten Oltmanns (born 6 October 1964, in Bremen) is a German manager, consultant and author. He focuses on strategy and stakeholder management as well as digitalisation.

== Life ==
Torsten Oltmanns studied economics at the University of Cologne and at the same time he was trained at the Cologne School of Journalism on economics and politics. In 1993 he obtained his diploma from the University of Cologne with a thesis on journalism. He published several articles touching on economic themes.

Subsequent to his function as a free-lance journalist and a position in politics he worked as manager and communications consultant at McKinsey. In 2000 he took over responsibility for controlling and privatization projects at the Federal Ministry of Defense in Bonn and Berlin. In 2003 he was part of the executive board of Booz Allen Hamilton and in 2004 he took over the position as a partner at the strategic consultancy Roland Berger. From 1 June until 31 December 2011 Oltmanns worked as an interim manager at the conglomerat Haniel and went back to Roland Berger in January 2012.

Since 2004, Oltmanns had been the editor of Roland Berger Strategy Consultants' think:act brand, which appears in various formats and which recently received the "Best in Corporate Publishing" award from the International Corporate Media Awards. The think:act series was awarded 2005, 2006 and 2007 with the BCP-Award in the category Corporate Publishing for "Financial Services / Real Estate / Consulting". In 2011 the think:act publications received the Astrid Awards of MerComm Inc.

Torsten Oltmanns is head of the Business Line "Stakeholder Management and Digital Transformation" as well as Chairman of Global Marketing at Roland Berger GmbH. He works at the interface between business, politics and media, supporting companies, governments and NGOs in all kinds of transformation programs, wage negotiations and digital change.

Since 2009 Torsten Oltmanns is Professor for Executive Communications at the University of Innsbruck (Austria) and served as a Visiting Fellow of the University of Oxford at the Oxford University Centre for Corporate Reputation, a part of the Saïd Business School. Since 2014 Torsten Oltmanns is Research Professor for Economic Policy at the Quadriga Hochschule Berlin.

Torsten Oltmanns is initiator of the public survey "Zukunft durch Bildung - Deutschland will's wissen". He is also co-founder and supporter of the 2011 founded registered association "investigate" which provides financial resources for journalists to realize complex researches. Oltmanns is also a member of the board of the German-Jewish association "Jewish Voice from Germany", which agitates for the relationship between Jewish and German people. Since December 2017 Oltmanns takes up the position of the Regional Chair Berlin/Brandenburg at the American Chamber of Commerce in Germany e.V.

As a member of the delegation of Roland Berger Strategy Consultants, a Strategic Partner of the World Economic Forum, Oltmanns has participated in the WEF Annual Meeting in Davos-Klosters. His commentary and impressions of the world's most important economic summit were published in his blog Bulletin from Davos.

Torsten Oltmanns takes frequently part in conferences and congresses. He focuses on subjects like strategy, digitalisation and communication.

On 17 November 2017 Oltmanns founded the "First East Frisian cooperative wine-growers organisation", a project to build up viniculture in East Frisia, Germany's coastal region.

In 2022, Torsten Oltmanns founded the zentrum Nachhaltige Transformation (Center for Sustainable Transformation) together with the Quadriga University of Applied Science and Hans Ulrich Helzer, who previously founded ergo Kommunikation, which grew to become a large PR Consulting firm (now merged into Edelman). The Center for Sustainable Transformation works with companies and NGOs to define and shape the economic transformation towards decarbonization and digitization. Through the combination of the three areas "Consulting", "Research" and "Collaboration" the Center for sustainable Transformation identifies best practices, empowers people to lead transformation and helps “Frienemies” to cooperate for practical change.

Torsten Oltmanns is committed to transatlantic friendship. He is a member of Atlantik-Brücke and as mentioned before the Chair of the American Chamber of Commerce Berlin-Brandenburg.

== Publications (extract) ==
- Torsten Oltmanns, Daniel Nemeyer: Change is a question of power. This book describes why projects revolving around change fail at top management level and how you can manage change successfully. (abstract; in German), original title: Machtfrage Change: Warum Veränderungsprojekte meist auf Führungsebene scheitern und wie Sie es besser machen, Campus, Frankfurt am Main 2010, ISBN 978-3-593-39203-5.
- Torsten Oltmanns, Ralf-Dieter Brunowsky: Re: think CEO 2. Managers in the media trap (abstract; in German), original title: Manager in der Medienfalle, BrunoMedia, Cologne 2009, ISBN 978-3-9811506-7-4
- Torsten Oltmanns (Hrsg.): Communication and Crises: how decision makers define reality (abstract; in German), original title: Kommunikation und Krise: Wie Entscheider die Wirklichkeit definieren, Gabler, Wiesbaden 2009, ISBN 978-3-593-38632-4.
- Torsten Oltmanns, Christiane Diekmann, Vera Böhm: Targeting the elite: How to reach decion makers (abstract; in German), original title: Eliten-Marketing: Wie Sie Entscheider erreichen. Campus, Frankfurt am Main 2008, ISBN 978-3-593-38632-4.
