= Douwe Kiela =

Dutch-American AI researcher (born 1986)

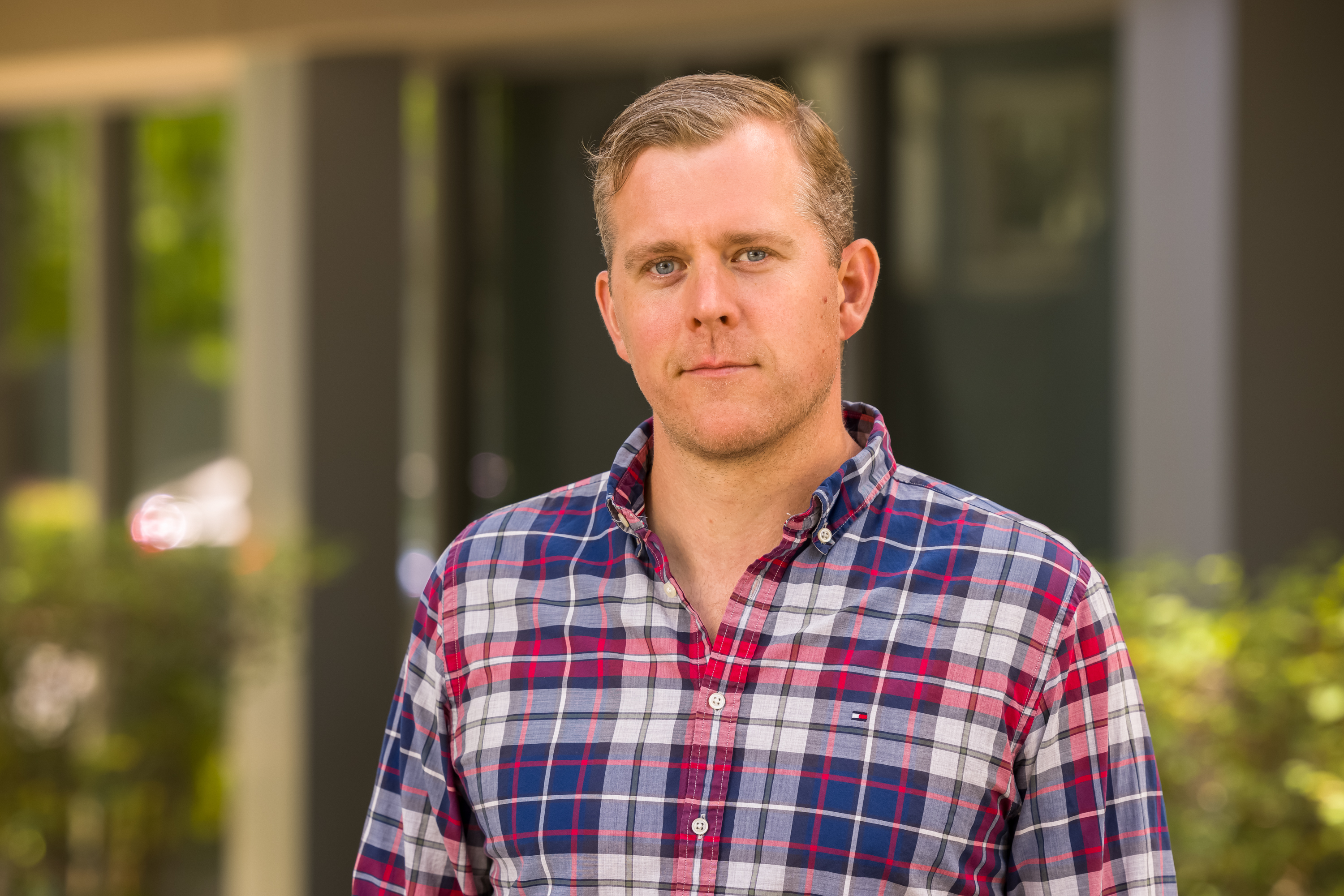
- Born: 1986 (age 39–40); Amsterdam, Netherlands
- Education: Utrecht University; University of Amsterdam; University of Cambridge
- Occupations: Researcher, entrepreneur
- Title: Research Scientist Director at Google DeepMind and Former CEO of Contextual AI

Douwe Kiela is a Dutch-American research scientist and entrepreneur working in the field of artificial intelligence with a focus on machine learning and natural language processing. He is a research scientist director at Google DeepMind. He previously co-founded and served as CEO of Contextual AI, an enterprise software company that provides a platform for building grounded AI agents for enterprise knowledge bases.

He previously led the research team at Meta AI that introduced the RAG approach in 2020, co-authoring the foundational paper "Retrieval-Augmented Generation for Knowledge-Intensive NLP Tasks." Kiela also served as Head of Research at Hugging Face and is an adjunct professor in Symbolic Systems at Stanford University.

== Early life and education ==
Douwe Kiela was born in Amsterdam, Netherlands, in 1986.

He earned a Bachelor of Science degree in Liberal Arts and Sciences from Utrecht University, with a double major in Cognitive Artificial Intelligence and Philosophy. He then obtained an MSc in logic (cum laude) from the University of Amsterdam's Institute for Logic, Language and Computation (ILLC). Kiela received an MPhil and PhD in Computer Science from the University of Cambridge, specializing in natural language processing and machine learning.

== Career ==
=== Facebook AI Research (Meta) ===
In 2016, Kiela joined Facebook AI Research (FAIR) as a postdoctoral researcher, later becoming a research scientist in New York. While at Meta, he co-authored papers in natural language processing, with a focus on multimodal and grounded language learning. His projects included creating a virtual assistant bot that could navigate tourists around a city and leading the development of Dynabench, an interactive benchmarking platform released in 2020 that used human feedback to test and improve language models.

In 2020, Kiela led the Meta AI research team that introduced Retrieval-Augmented Generation (RAG), co-authoring the influential paper "Retrieval-Augmented Generation for Knowledge-Intensive NLP Tasks," alongside Patrick Lewis, Ethan Perez, and other researchers. The RAG framework transformed how large language models access and incorporate external information by allowing them to retrieve relevant context from external knowledge bases at query time, rather than relying solely on pre-trained data. This approach addressed key limitations such as hallucination, outdated information, and lack of source attribution. The RAG technique has since become widely adopted in enterprise AI applications and knowledge-intensive natural language processing tasks.

=== Hugging Face ===
After leaving Meta, Kiela served as Head of Research at Hugging Face.

=== Contextual AI ===
In 2023, Kiela co-founded Contextual AI with Amanpreet Singh, another former researcher at Facebook AI Research and Hugging Face. The Mountain View-based company develops a platform for building grounded AI agents for enterprises, focusing on applications in technology, semiconductor, logistics, finance, and media sectors.

Contextual AI raised $20 million in seed funding in June 2023, led by Bain Capital Ventures. In August 2024, the company completed an $80 million Series A funding round led by Greycroft, with participation from Bezos Expeditions, NVentures (Nvidia), HSBC Ventures, and Snowflake Ventures, among others.

In May 2026, Kiela joined Google DeepMind as part of a licensing agreement between Google and Contextual AI under which more than 20 Contextual AI researchers joined DeepMind. Following his departure, Jay Chen became interim CEO of Contextual AI.

=== Academic roles ===
Douwe Kiela serves as an adjunct professor in Symbolic Systems at Stanford University. In a 2023 interview with the Stanford Daily, he commented on the development of Alpaca, a low-cost instruction-finetuned model based on Meta's LLaMA, and emphasized the importance of open academic research in large language models.
