= Atlantik-Brücke =

Political and economic think tank based in Germany

- Formation: 1952
- Founded at: Hamburg
- Type: Private non-profit association
- Purpose: To promote German-American understanding and Atlanticism
- Headquarters: Berlin
- Website: www.atlantik-bruecke.org

Atlantik-Brücke (German: [atˈlantɪkˌbʁʏkə], Atlantic Bridge) is a private non-profit association to promote German-American understanding and Atlanticism. Founded in Hamburg in 1952, it was located in Bonn between 1983 and 1999 and is now located in Berlin.

The association organizes invitation-only conferences, seminars and colloquia. Through various programs for "Young Leaders", military officers, journalists, and students, Atlantik-Brücke fosters social networks among current and future leaders in business and world affairs. Atlantik-Brücke also awards prizes in honor of Vernon A. Walters and Eric M. Warburg. Atlantik-Brücke annually presents the George H.W. Bush award, an award given to those who have improved German and U.S. relations. It was first given in August 2015 to its namesake, U.S. statesman Pres. George H. W. Bush at his residence Walker's Point Estate, Maine.

In 2014, the German political cabaret show Die Anstalt named the Atlantik-Brücke as one of several "NATO-friendly elite networks" that "are little more than transatlantic swinger-clubs". After exposing that several high-ranking German journalists and media moguls are members of the Atlantik-Brücke (among other American lobbying organisations), the broadcast criticised multiple widely circulated German newspapers as "being akin to local editions of the NATO press office". Following the broadcast, several journalists whose connections to the Atlantik-Brücke were exposed attempted to sue the ZDF for broadcasting the show. The lawsuit was struck down by the Federal Court of Justice in 2017, which ruled that no personal rights were violated and that the characterisations made by Die Anstalt were "quite accurate".

== Young Leaders ==
The two Atlantik-Brücke Young Leaders conferences receive more than 500 applications per year, from which 120 Young Leaders are chosen with the help of a steering committee of political, business and academic leaders. Sixty young leaders are chosen for the German-American Conference (30 Americans and 30 Germans) and sixty are chosen for the European Conference. As of 2011, the German-American Young Leaders Conference has been running for 33 years.

The Young Leaders Program initiated by Atlantik-Brücke represents the oldest and largest program dedicated to identifying and nurturing relationships among the future custodians of the transatlantic partnership. Since the first Young Leaders Conference was held in 1973, over 1,500 Europeans and Americans have attended one of thirty-two German-American Young Leaders Conferences or ten European Young Leaders Conferences. Alumni of these prestigious gatherings remain in contact with each other both informally and through regional discussion groups and biennial alumni conferences that had been held under the auspices of Atlantik-Brücke. On January 1, 2011 Atlantik-Brücke established the independent organization "Atlantik Forum e.V. – the Young Leaders Alumni of Atlantik-Brücke" to more effectively facilitate and manage all these activities.

=== Prominent Young Leaders alumni ===
- Christian Wulff, Former Federal President of Germany
- Thomas de Maizière, Former Federal Minister of Interior
- Karl-Theodor zu Guttenberg, Former Federal Minister of Defense
- Michael Otto, chairman of the supervisory board of Otto Group
- Jürgen Großmann, Chairman of the Managing Board of RWE
- Thomas Enders, President and CEO of Airbus Industries
- Paul-Bernhard Kallen, chairman of the Board of Hubert Burda Media Holding
- Hans-Gert Pöttering, Former President of the European Parliament
- Charles Schumer, Senior U.S. Senator from New York
- Cem Özdemir, Chairman of Alliance 90/The Greens
- Edelgard Bulmahn Member of Parliament; Former Federal Minister of Education and Research
- Michael Vassiliadis, chairman of the Board of IG BCE – Mining, Chemical and Energy Industrial Union
- Wolfgang Ischinger, Former German Ambassador to the United States and Chair of the Munich Security Conference
- Richard Burt, Former United States Ambassador to Germany
- Craig Kennedy, President of the German Marshall Fund of the U.S.
- Kai Diekmann, Editor-in-Chief of BILD Zeitung
- Katja Gloger, Editor-at-large, STERN Magazin
- Joshua Bolten, Former White House Chief of Staff, President George W. Bush
- Jens Spahn, Former German Federal Minister Of Health
- Tobias Lindner, State Secretary in the German Ministry of Foreign Affairs
- Moritz Baier-Lentz, Partner, Lightspeed Venture Partners
- Geoffrey Okamoto, Former First Deputy Managing Director, International Monetary Fund
- Danyal Bayaz, Finance Minister, Baden-Württemberg

== Extract of member list ==
Below you can find an extract of the member list of the Atlantik Brücke e.V.

- Philip D. Murphy, Governor of New Jersey, former United States Ambassador to Germany
- Henry Kissinger, former Secretary of State of the United States of America
- Josef Ackermann, former CEO of Deutsche Bank, Germany
- Karl-Theodor zu Guttenberg, former Minister of Defense of Germany
- Helmut Kohl, former Chancellor of Germany
- Helmut Schmidt, former Chancellor of Germany
- Rupert Stadler, former chairman of Audi AG
- Torsten Oltmanns, Global Marketing Director at Roland Berger Strategy Consultants
- Joachim Gauck, former President of Germany
- Angela Merkel, former Chancellor of Germany
