= NeuralGarage =

Generative AI company based in India

- Type: Private
- Industry: Generative AI
- Founded: 27 July 2021
- Founders: Mandar Natekar, Subhabrata Debnath, Anjan Banerjee, Subhashish Saha
- Headquarters: Bangalore, India
- Services: AI dubbing and lip-syncing software
- Website: visualdub.ai

NeuralGarage is a generative artificial intelligence company founded in 2021 in Bangalore, India. It develops AI technologies related to audiovisual content. Its core technology is VisualDub, a system designed to synchronize dubbed audio with lip and facial movements.

== History ==
NeuralGarage was founded in 2021 in Bangalore, India, by Mandar Natekar, Subhabrata Debnath, Anjan Banerjee, and Subhashish Saha.

In 2022, NeuralGarage raised US$1.45 million in a seed funding round led by Exfinity Venture Partners, along with participation from Amit Patni’s family office and other investors.

In 2024, NeuralGarage was selected for the Google for Startups Accelerator: AI First, was one of 80 startups chosen for the Amazon Web Services Generative AI Accelerator cohort, and was included in TechCrunch’s "Startup Battlefield 200" at Disrupt.

In 2025, NeuralGarage won the "Entertainment, Media, Sports & Content" category at the SXSW Pitch competition, becoming the first Indian startup reported to have received this award.

== Applications ==
VisualDub has been used in Kesari Chapter 2, episodes of Special Ops, the "Chikitu" song in Coolie, and War 2.

== See also ==
- Generative artificial intelligence
- Lip-sync
- Audiovisual translation
- Machine translation
