= Maluuba =

Canadian technology company

Maluuba Inc.

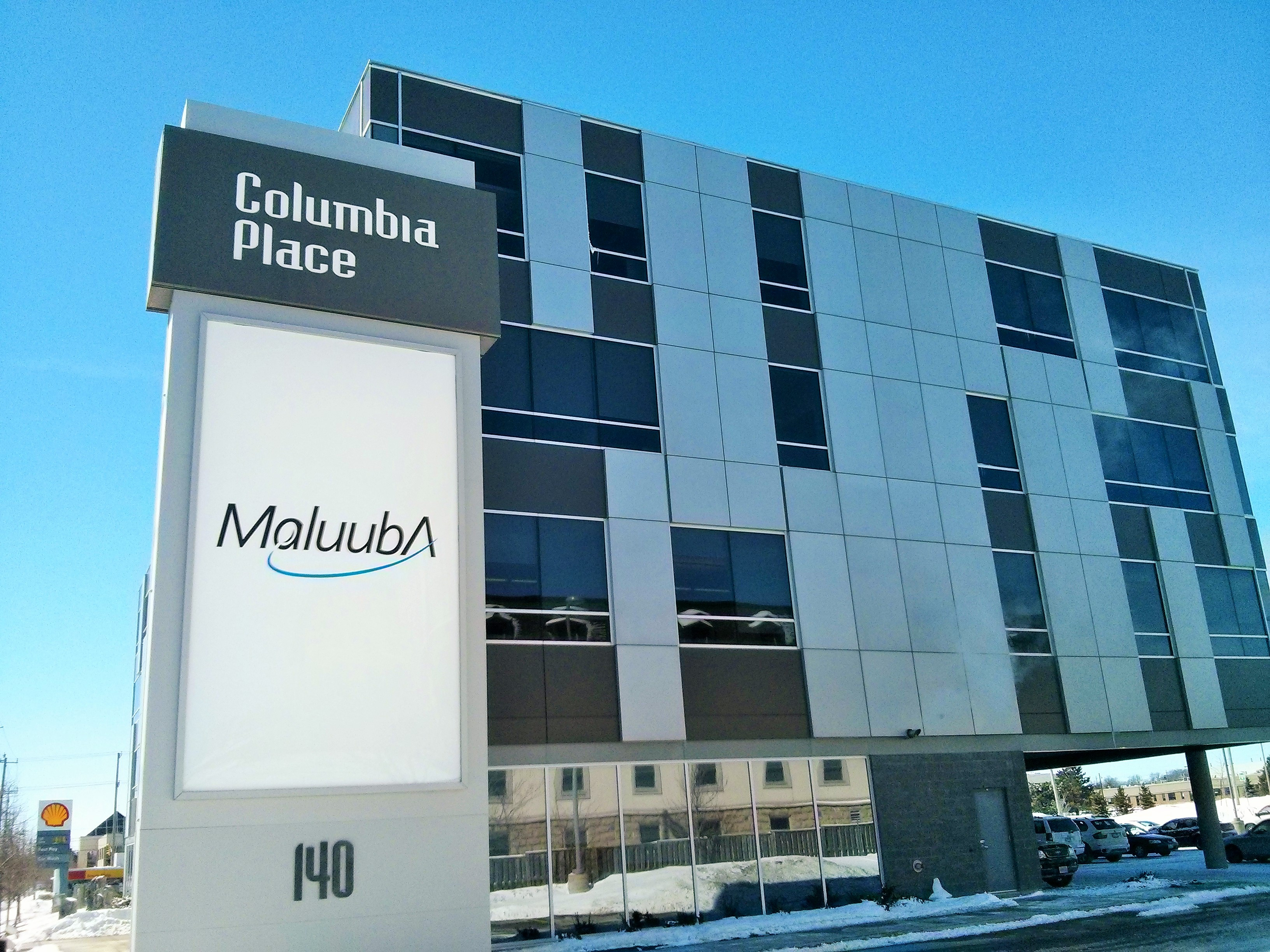
- Maluuba sign at the Waterloo office, 2014
- Type: Subsidiary
- Industry: Artificial Intelligence, Natural language processing
- Founded: 2011 in Waterloo, Ontario
- Founder: Sam Pasupalak; Kaheer Suleman; Zhiyuan Wu; Joshua Pantony
- Headquarters: Montreal, Quebec, Canada
- Parent: Microsoft Corporation
- Website: www.maluuba.com

Maluuba Inc. was a Canadian technology company conducting research in artificial intelligence and language understanding. Founded in 2011, the company was acquired by Microsoft in 2017.

In late March 2016, the company demonstrated a machine reading system capable of answering arbitrary questions about J.K Rowling’s Harry Potter and the Philosopher’s Stone. Maluuba's natural language understanding technology is used by several consumer electronic brands for over 50 million devices.

== History ==
Maluuba was founded by four undergraduate students from the University of Waterloo, Zhiyuan Wu, Joshua Pantony, Sam Pasupalak and Kaheer Suleman. Their initial proof of concept was a program that allowed users to search for flights using their voice.

In February 2012, the company secured $2 million (~$2.77 million in 2025) in seed funding from Samsung Ventures.

Since 2013, Maluuba has partnered with several companies in the smart phone, smart TV, automotive and IoT space.

In August 2015 Maluuba secured a $9 million (~$11.9 million in 2025) of Series A investment from Nautilus Ventures and Emerllion Capital. Then in December 2015, Maluuba opened an R&D lab in Montreal, Quebec.

By 2016 the company employed more than fifty people, and had published fifteen peer-reviewed research papers focused on language understanding.

On January 13, 2017, Maluuba announced they had been acquired by Microsoft for $140M (~$181 million in 2025). In July 2017, according to the reports, Maluuba closed its Kitchener-Waterloo office and moved employees to its Montreal office.

== Research ==
Maluuba's research centre opened in Montreal, Quebec in December 2015. The lab was advised by Yoshua Bengio (University of Montreal) and Richard Sutton (University of Alberta). Prior to its acquisition by Microsoft, the lab published fifteen peer-reviewed papers. The lab also partnered with local universities: University of Montreal MILA lab and McGill University.

=== Machine reading comprehension (MRC) ===
In March 2016, Maluuba demonstrated their machine reading comprehension technology on the MCTest outperforming other word-matching approaches by 8%

Maluuba continued their work on MRC throughout 2016. In June, the company demonstrated a program called EpiReader which outperformed Facebook and Google in machine comprehension tests. Several research teams were able to match Maluuba's results since the paper was released. EpiReader made use of two large datasets, the CNN/Daily Mail dataset released by Google DeepMind, comprising over 300,000 news articles; and the Children's Book Test, posted by Facebook Research, made up of 98 children’s books open sourced under Project Gutenberg.

Following this achievement, the company released two natural language datasets: NewsQA, focused on comprehension and Frames, focused on Dialogue.

=== Dialogue systems ===
The company has published research findings into dialogue systems which comprises natural language understanding, state tracking, and natural language generation. Maluuba published a research paper learning dialogue policies with deep reinforcement learning. In 2016, Maluuba also freely released the Frames dataset, which is a large human-generated corpus of conversations.

=== Reinforcement learning ===
The company conducts research into reinforcement learning in which intelligent agents are motivated to take actions within a set environment in order to maximize a reward. The research team has also published several papers on scalability.

In June 2017, the Maluuba team was the first to beat the game Ms. Pac-Man for the Atari 2600 system.

== Applications ==
Numerous applications for Maluuba's technology have been proposed in industry with several applications being commercialized.

One of the first applications of Maluuba's natural language technology has been the smartphone assistant. These systems allow users to speak to their phone and get direct results to their question (instead of merely seeing a sea of blue web links that point to possible answers to their question). The company raised $9M (~$11.9 million in 2025) in 2015 to bring their voice assistant technology to automotive and IOT sectors.

== See also ==
- Glossary of artificial intelligence
