= ModelBest =

Chinese AI company

ModelBest Inc.
- Native name: 面壁智能
- Type: Private
- Industry: Artificial intelligence Natural language processing
- Founded: August 2022
- Headquarters: Beijing, China
- Key people: Li Dahai; Liu Zhiyuan
- Products: MiniCPM series Luca (面壁露卡); VoxCPM; Pinea Pi
- Website: modelbest.cn

ModelBest Inc. (Chinese: 面壁智能; Pinyin: Miànbì Zhìnéng) is a Chinese artificial intelligence company based in the Haidian District of Beijing. The company originated from Tsinghua University's Natural Language Processing Laboratory and develops large language models and multimodal AI systems. Its products include the open-source MiniCPM series of AI models.

== History ==
ModelBest was founded in August 2022 as a spin-off from Tsinghua University's NLP Laboratory. In November 2023, the company launched Luca, a multimodal dialogue assistant. The company received funding through several investment rounds. In April 2023, ModelBest raised angel funding led by Zhihu, with participation from Zhipu AI. In April 2024, ModelBest raised hundreds of millions of RMB in a Series A funding round involving Springhill Fund and Huawei Habo. Subsequent funding rounds occurred in December 2024, led by Loongson Capital, and throughout 2025, involving investors such as Beijing State-owned Capital and CICC Porsche Fund. In January 2026, the company was recognized on the "Future Unicorn 100" list by Cyzone.

== Products and technology ==
ModelBest develops the MiniCPM series of AI models designed to run on consumer devices rather than cloud servers. In June 2025, ModelBest released MiniCPM 4.0 alongside its CPM.cu inference framework, which was developed to improve processing speed. In early 2026, ModelBest introduced MiniCPM-o 4.5, a full-duplex multimodal model that processes video, audio and text inputs and is intended for use in robotics and vehicles.

ModelBest has also developed hardware and applications for specific industries. In February 2026, ModelBest announced the Pinea Pi (松果派), an AI development board. The board uses NVIDIA Jetson modules and supports running MiniCPM models without an internet connection. ModelBest's models have also been used in automotive applications involving Geely, Changan Automobile and Volkswagen. The Mazda EZ-60 and Geely Galaxy M9 were among the vehicles reported to use ModelBest's multimodal technology in 2025.

== See also ==
- Artificial intelligence industry in China
