= William Wu (entrepreneur) =

Australian entrepreneur

- Born: 1993 (age 32–33); Sydney, Australia
- Education: University of New South Wales; London School of Economics; Wharton School of the University of Pennsylvania
- Occupation: Entrepreneur
- Years active: 2015–present
- Known for: Catheon Gaming, Artisse AI

William Wu (born 1993) is an Australian entrepreneur known for founding Catheon Gaming and Artisse AI.

== Early life and education ==
Wu was born in Sydney, Australia, in 1993 and attended Sydney Grammar School. He earned a Bachelor of Commerce in Finance and Business Economics from the University of New South Wales, followed by a Master of Science in Finance and Private Equity from the London School of Economics. He later completed a Master of Business Administration (MBA) at The Wharton School of the University of Pennsylvania.

== Career ==
After his studies, Wu began his career in finance and consulting. He interned at the United Nations in early 2015 and worked as an investment banking summer analyst at Bank of America Merrill Lynch. Later he joined McKinsey & Company in London as a Senior Business Analyst, specializing in corporate strategy and restructuring. He later moved into private equity, serving as a vice president at Oaktree Capital Management in Hong Kong from 2017 to 2021, where he focused on special situations investing.

=== Catheon Gaming ===
In 2021, Wu co-founded SolChicks, a play-to-earn game on the Solana blockchain. Building on that success, he established Catheon Gaming, an integrated blockchain gaming company. Under his leadership, Catheon launched around 30 blockchain titles within its first year and raised between $50 million and $55 million through private rounds and a public token sale. The company partnered with traditional game developers to integrate Web3 mechanics such as NFTs and token-based economies.

In 2022, Catheon Gaming was ranked the top 10 "emerging giant" in Asia–Pacific by HSBC and KPMG, out of over 6,000 startups. Wu appointed industry veterans like former Activision Blizzard executive Mark Aubrey to scale the business. However, by late 2022, during a widespread downturn in the crypto market, Catheon reduced its headcount and several key executives, including Aubrey, departed.

=== Artisse AI ===
In 2023, Wu founded Artisse AI, a generative AI startup based in Hong Kong, focused on personalized photography. Drawing from technologies developed during his time in gaming, the app enables users to create hyperrealistic photos using their own selfies. Launched in mid-2023, Artisse quickly surpassed 200,000 downloads and achieved top rankings on app stores in several markets. In early 2024, Wu secured $6.7 million in seed funding to expand Artisse globally.
