= LightOn =

French artificial intelligence company

LightOn SA
- Type: Public
- Traded as: Euronext Paris: ALTAI
- Industry: Artificial intelligence
- Founded: 2016; 10 years ago
- Founders: Igor Carron; Laurent Daudet; Florent Krzakala; Sylvain Gigan
- Headquarters: Paris, France
- Key people: Igor Carron (Président Directeur Général); Laurent Daudet (Directeur Général Délégué)
- Products: On-prem Enterprise Generative AI platform Large Language Model
- Number of employees: 41 (2024)
- Website: lighton.ai

LightOn SA is a French company focused on artificial intelligence (AI), that develops generative AI solutions for enterprises.

Its current product is the Paradigm platform, an on-prem/secure Enterprise generative AI platform.

In November 2024, it became Europe's first listed GenAI startup to launched an IPO on Euronext Growth Paris.

== History ==
=== Early development (2016–2021) ===
LightOn was established in 2016 in Paris by French engineers and entrepreneurs Igor Carron, Laurent Daudet, Florent Krzakala and Sylvain Gigan. The founders, with backgrounds in optics and AI, aimed to develop hardware solutions that could accelerate AI computations using optical processing. The company's first product, the Optical Processing Unit (OPU), was launched in 2018. The approach aims to increase the efficiency of massive parallel processing in tasks that involve large-scale data such has Large Language Model.

In 2021, One of LightOn OPU was integrated in Jean Zay, one of the French National Centre for Scientific Research supercomputer, making it the first of the TOP500 world's most powerful computer using such hardware.

=== Enterprise AI platform (2020–present) ===
Parallel to this focus, starting in 2020, LightOn trained several LLMs and released a few as Open Source on several supercomputers. LightOn's main product is now an on-prem, secure Enterprise generative AI platform called Paradigm.

In 2024, LightOn launched an IPO and became Europe's first listed GenAI startup.

Since the end of 2024, LightOn's solutions were implemented by various entities such as Ile-de-France region, Safran, Groupama, and the French Space Agency (CNES). The company also partnered with Orange Business and Hewlett Packard Enterprise to integrate its AI software with their cloud and other offerings.

Language Models

LightOn, also released MonoQwen-Vision, the first visual document reranker and in collaboration with AnswerAI, released ModernBERT, a model that has been downloaded more than 20 million times.

In 2025, the LightOn Engineering team released several BERT-architecture models such as Reason-ModernColBERT, GTE-ModernColBERT and BioClinical ModernBERT. BioClinical ModernBERT was developed in collaboration with the Dana-Farber Cancer Institute in collaboration with researchers at Harvard University, MIT, McGill University, Albany Medical College and Microsoft Research. The company also released as open source, the Ettin Suite, the first state-of-the-art paired encoder-decoder models, developed with Johns Hopkins University.

Between 2020 and 2025, LightOn has trained more than 12 Large Language Models.

Advanced Retrieval Technology

To support production deployment of these models, LightOn developed a suite of open-source tools for multi-vector retrieval that enable real-time, updatable search systems. PyLate simplifies multi-vector model training, while FastPlaid provides a 554% performance improvement over Stanford PLAID, making it suitable for enterprise RAG pipelines and recommendation systems. PyLate-rs extends this capability to browser-based applications through WebAssembly compilation. These tools transform multi-vector retrieval from a research concept into production-ready technology for dynamic enterprise search and AI agents.
