= Translated (company) =

Italian language technology and localization company

- Type: Private
- Industry: Language technology, Machine translation, Localization
- Founded: 1999
- Founders: Marco Trombetti, Isabelle Andrieu
- Headquarters: Rome, Italy
- Key people: Marco Trombetti (CEO)
- Website: translated.com

Translated is an Italian language technology and localization company headquartered in Rome. Founded in 1999 by Marco Trombetti and Isabelle Andrieu, the company develops machine translation, multilingual AI, and localization technologies combining automated translation with human revision. Its platforms support context-aware localization and AI-assisted translation workflows.

== History ==
Translated was founded in Rome in 1999 by computer scientist Marco Trombetti and linguist Isabelle Andrieu. The company initially focused on online translation services before expanding into neural machine translation and AI-assisted localization technologies.

In 2021, Translated received its first external investment round after more than two decades of bootstrapped growth, securing approximately US$30 million in funding. Translated was included in lists of rapidly growing European technology companies. It expanded its research activities in multilingual AI systems, adaptive machine translation, and reasoning-based translation models.

In 2024, Translated introduced Lara, a multilingual AI translation model designed to provide contextual and reasoning-based translations across more than 200 languages. Italian media described Lara as part of wider European efforts to develop multilingual AI systems independent from major U.S.-based platforms.

In 2026, AI-assisted translation technologies developed by Translated were introduced at St. Peter's Basilica in Vatican for multilingual live translation of liturgical events and masses in dozens of languages.

== Technology ==
Translated develops neural machine translation and localization technologies based on large language models and adaptive AI systems. The company’s systems combine machine-generated translation with human revision workflows, an approach often described as “human-in-the-loop” localization. Translated has published research regarding translation quality evaluation and AI performance metrics. One such metric, known as Time to Edit (TTE), measures the time required for professional translators to correct machine-generated translations. Research presented by the company at the AMTA 2022 conference suggested that editing times for machine translation output had steadily decreased over time as neural machine translation systems improved. Marco Trombetti has argued that progress in machine translation may serve as an indicator for broader advances toward artificial general intelligence (AGI). The company has also researched multimodal AI systems through projects including DVPS (Diversibus Viis Plurima Solvo, Latin for 'Through diverse paths, I solve many issues').

== Partnerships and projects ==
Translated has collaborated with technology companies and institutions on multilingual AI and localization initiatives. The company has participated in European AI research initiatives and Horizon Europe projects related to multilingual artificial intelligence.

== Reception ==
Translated has been discussed in coverage about European artificial intelligence companies and multilingual AI infrastructure. The company and its CEO Marco Trombetti have also appeared in discussions concerning AI regulation, multilingual AI systems, and European artificial intelligence development.
