= Linagora =

French software company

- Type: Private
- Industry: Open-source software Artificial Intelligence
- Founded: 2000; 26 years ago
- Founder: Alexandre Zapolsky; Michel-Marie Maudet
- Headquarters: Paris, France
- Area served: Worldwide
- Key people: Alexandre Zapolsky; Michel-Marie Maudet
- Products: Open-source software solutions, Large Language Model
- Number of employees: 200 (2024)
- Subsidiaries: OpenLLM France
- Website: www.linagora.com www.openllm-france.fr

Linagora is a French open source software editor, founded in June 2000 by Alexandre Zapolsky and Michel-Marie Maudet.

Located in France, as well as in Belgium, Canada, Vietnam, the United States and Tunisia, the company employs around 200 people.

In 2023, Linagora created the OpenLLM France community, alongside other French Artificial Intelligence companies and organizations.

In 2025, the company launched Lucie, an opensource Large Language Model.

== History ==
Linagora was founded on June 28, 2000 by Alexandre Zapolsky and Michel-Marie Maudet. Its name is a contraction of the words "Linux" and "Agora". Soon after founding the company, the two entrepreneurs were joined by Alexandre Zapolsky's wife and brother, who took on the roles of commercial director and administrative and financial director of the SME.

In 2007, the company was selected by the French National Assembly to provide the software for Linux computers, replacing Microsoft Windows. Linagora then became the leading French open source software company by revenue.

In 2015, French Prime Minister Manuel Valls allocated €10.7 million from the "Investments for the Future" fund for a research program aimed at developing a new generation of open source software platforms based on Linagora's offerings.

In September 2016, Linagora launched the social network "La Cerise" for the newspaper L'Humanité. This app offered a service and tool for readers and citizens mobilizing for causes. It aimed to share engagement through petitions, discussions, agendas, and contacts.

In October 2016, the company won two public contracts for supporting open source software in forty-two French ministries and other administrative entities.

In May 2019, Linagora organized a fundraising event in the presence of the French Secretary of State for Digital Affairs, Cédric O, to celebrate its 19th anniversary. The funds were intended for:

- Supporting parents of hospitalized Polynesian children in France.
- Equipping primary school students with digital devices (tablets or PCs).
- Establishing a digital academy "OpenHackademy" in French Polynesia to train unemployed youth in digital skills and help them find jobs.

In December 2022, Linagora acquired a property known as "Maison Rocher", and later "Maison Chocolat," located on the Île Saint-Germain in Issy-les-Moulineaux. Renamed "Villa Good Tech" by Linagora, this award-winning architectural work by Éric Daniel-Lacombe became the company's new headquarters, aiming to provide a space for associative actors and companies to develop technologies that contribute to a better world.

In July 2023, Linagora launched OpenLLM France, a community initially comprising around twenty actors focused on generative AI. The goal was to develop a sovereign and open source large language model. This initiative, led by co-founder and CEO Michel-Marie Maudet, had more than four hundred French members by early 2024. and announced its expansion to the European sphere during Fosdem 2024.

In February 2024, the CNRS and Linagora signed a framework agreement to strengthen their research collaboration.

In January 2025, Linagora released Lucie, an open source and sovereign AI that faced ridicule due to tests on an unfinished, uncensored version designed for scientific and experimental use. The platform divided opinions between those who saw it as a technological achievement and those who criticized it as "French bashing" compared to American and Chinese AIs.

== Acquisitions ==
The company acquired:

- In July 2007, the SME AliaSource, based in Ramonville-Saint-Agne and led by its founder, Pierre Baudracco.
- In 2008, the open source web hosting company Netaktiv, a member of the GIE Gitoyen, announced during the 2008 Solutions Linux trade show.
- In 2012, the Toulouse-based company EBM Websourcing, the publisher of the open-source software Petals Link, and took over its development.
- In 2016, the digital agency Neoma Interactive, specializing in UX design and digital communication strategy.

== Locations ==
In 2017, the company's headquarters was located in Issy-les-Moulineaux, with branches in Lyon, Toulouse, Marseille, and internationally in Brussels, San Francisco, Montreal, Vietnam, and Tunisia. In 2005, the company attempted to establish a presence in Nantes.

In 2024, the headquarters was moved to Issy-les-Moulineaux.

== Activity ==
=== Software ===
Twake Workplace

One of Linagora's flagship products is Twake Workplace, which stands out as a 100% open-source solution compared with those of the GAFAMs. Twake Workplace is available as a complete platform or module by module. It includes :

- Twake Mail, a powerful modern messaging solution based on the JMAP protocol and the James email server from the Apache Foundation, for which Linagora provides technical management;
- Twake Chat, an instant communications solution for businesses developed using the Matrix protocol and compatible with the French government's chat solution, Tchap;
- Twake Drive, an easy-to-use collaborative platform for group work using OnlyOffice.

==== OpenPaaS ====
In 2018, the search engine Qwant announced that its email service Qwantmail would be based on the OpenPaaS product.

In 2022, Qwant announced the abandonment of its Qwantmail project due to Linagora's collection of personal email addresses and serious security breaches. The site Next (formerly PC INpact) published an article in January 2020 criticizing the "failures and delays" of the Qwantmail project led by Linagora, which led to the CNIL's intervention regarding Qwant and Linagora.

==== LinTO ====
In 2017, Linagora launched its open source voice assistant project named LinTO. This enterprise voice assistant, described as "GAFAM Free," was presented at CES 2018 in Las Vegas.

The LinTO voice framework was developed as part of the eponymous research project funded by Bpifrance (Grands Défis du Numérique instrument).

=== Services ===
==== OSSA (Open Source Software Assurance) ====
One of the company's main activities is OSSA.

Through OSSA, Linagora provided support for open source software for 42 ministries and other administrative entities in 2012.

== Legal issues ==
=== Dispute with BlueMind ===
In 2012, a legal dispute arose between BlueMind and Linagora. Linagora accused BlueMind of copyright infringement, unfair competition, and breach of a non-compete clause, leading to several legal actions.

Linagora sued BlueMind for copyright infringement and unfair competition in the Bordeaux court, which ruled in Linagora's favor for unfair competition and parasitism but rejected the copyright claim. BlueMind was ordered to pay nearly €170,000 to Linagora.

Linagora sued former associates Pierre Baudracco and Pierre Carlier in the Paris Commercial Court for breach of a non-compete clause and violation of a warranty of eviction. The court dismissed Linagora's claims and ordered it to pay €20,000 each to Baudracco and Carlier. Linagora appealed, and the Paris Court of Appeal partially overturned the decision, awarding Linagora €480,000.

BlueMind sued Linagora for defamation and public insult in the Toulouse Criminal Court. The court ruled against Linagora, but the decision was overturned by the Court of Cassation in January 2024, and the case was remanded for retrial.

=== Conviction for wrongful termination and harassment ===
On June 14, 2017, France 3 reported on a decision by the Versailles Court of Appeal, which ruled that Linagora had wrongfully terminated an employee and subjected them to moral harassment. The court ordered Linagora to pay the employee €22,000 for wrongful termination, €11,000 for notice pay, €6,600 for legal severance pay, €3,200 for conservative suspension, and €3,000 for moral harassment.
