= Contextual AI =

American enterprise software company

- Type: Privately held company
- Industry: Information technology
- Founded: 2023
- Founders: Douwe Kiela, Amanpreet Singh
- Headquarters: Mountain View, California, U.S.
- Number of employees: 95
- Website: contextual.ai

Contextual AI is an AI software company based in Mountain View, California. It develops a platform for building specialized Retrieval-Augmented Generation (RAG) agents for enterprise use. The company was founded in 2023 by Douwe Kiela and Amanpreet Singh, both former AI researchers at Facebook AI Research (FAIR) and Hugging Face.

Contextual AI provides generative AI applications, with deployments primarily in the technology, banking, finance and media sectors.

== History ==
In 2020, while working at Meta, Kiela worked with others to develop retrieval-augmented generation, as a way to improve the performance of large language models (LLMs).

In June 2023, Contextual AI announced it had raised $20 million in a seed funding round led by Bain Capital Ventures (BCV), with participation from Lightspeed Venture Partners, Greycroft, SV Angel, and several angel investors.

In August 2024, the company raised $80 million in a Series A funding round led by Greycroft, with participation from previous investors including Bain Capital Ventures, Lightspeed, and Conviction Partners. The round also included new backers such as Bezos Expeditions, NVentures (Nvidia), HSBC Ventures, and Snowflake Ventures.

In January 2025, Contextual AI announced the general availability of its enterprise platform for building specialized RAG agents. In March 2025, the company introduced a Grounded Language Model (GLM) as way to attempt to improve factual accuracy in enterprise AI applications.

== Applications ==
Contextual AI's platform has been used in finance, technology, media and professional services.

== See also ==
- List of artificial intelligence companies
