= Decart =

Israeli artificial intelligence company

- Type: Private
- Industry: Artificial intelligence
- Founded: September 7, 2023; 3 years ago
- Founders: Dean Leitersdorf; Orian Leitersdorf; Moshe Shalev
- Headquarters: Tel Aviv, Israel
- Key people: Dean Leitersdorf (CEO); Orian Leitersdorf (CSO); Moshe Shalev (CPO)
- Products: Oasis; Lucy; Decart Optimization Stack (DOS)
- Number of employees: 60+ (as of August 2025)
- Website: decart.ai

Decart (styled Decart AI) is an Israeli artificial intelligence company that develops real-time world models and the infrastructure to power them. Real-time world models are generative AI systems that produce interactive video and simulated environments frame by frame with low latency.

Founded in September 2023 by Dean Leitersdorf, Orian Leitersdorf, and Moshe Shalev, the company is headquartered in Tel Aviv, with additional offices in San Francisco and New York.

In October 2024, Decart released Oasis, an AI model that generated a real-time, playable simulation of Minecraft. It also developed Lucy, a video-to-video model for editing video streams in real-time.

In 2025, Decart became the first Israeli AI-focused unicorn company. As of 2026, it has a valuation of approximately $4 billion.

== History ==
Decart was founded on September 7, 2023, by Dean Leitersdorf, his brother Orian Leitersdorf, and Moshe Shalev. Dean Leitersdorf and Shalev met while serving in reserve duty in Unit 8200, an intelligence unit of the Israel Defense Forces.

In October 2024, Decart publicly launched and announced a $21 million seed funding round led by investor Oren Zeev. The company began operations as an AI lab. Its initial commercial product, later branded the Decart Optimization Stack (DOS), was designed to reduce the cost of training and running AI models by improving GPU efficiency.

=== Oasis ===
On October 31, 2024, Decart released Oasis, a playable, real-time, open-world AI model, developed jointly with AI chip startup Etched. The model generated a Minecraft-style video game frame by frame in response to keyboard and mouse input, simulating physics, rules and graphics without traditional game code, and was trained on recorded Minecraft gameplay footage.

By August 2025, Decart had grown to more than 60 employees, and had opened additional offices in San Francisco and New York alongside its Tel Aviv headquarters and a research presence in northern Israel.

=== Lucy ===
In 2025, Decart introduced Lucy, a real-time world model for immersive video applications such as virtual try-on, live streaming, and advertising, and in January 2026 released an updated version, Lucy 2, which could generate continuous 1080p video at 30 frames per second. Applications include real-time character and wardrobe changes for livestreamers and integration with Nvidia Omniverse for robotics training simulations. The Lucy 2 model was deployed on Amazon's Trainium3 chips. According to an Amazon executive, the deployment achieved more than 80% model FLOPS utilization. In July 2026, Decart released Lucy 2.5.

=== Oasis 3 ===
In June 2026, Decart unveiled Oasis 3, an interactive world model built on its Lucy foundation model that generates photorealistic, multi-camera driving environments in real time for training autonomous vehicle systems. In July 2025, Decart announced a collaboration with the Technion – Israel Institute of Technology, providing funding for the university's undergraduate honors program, which was subsequently renamed the Technion–Decart Excellence Program. The two organizations also signed a memorandum of understanding to establish a joint artificial intelligence research center.

== Funding ==
In October 2024, Decart raised US$21 million seed funding round led by investor Oren Zeev. In December 2024, Decart raised a $32 million Series A round led by Benchmark, with participation from Sequoia Capital and Zeev Ventures, at a valuation of $500 million. By August 2025, the company raised $100 million at a $3.1 billion valuation, in a round including new investor Aleph alongside returning investors Sequoia Capital, Benchmark, and Zeev Ventures. After this round, Decart became the first AI-focused unicorn in Israel. In May 2026, Decart raised $300 million in a funding round led by Radical Ventures, with new investors including Nvidia, Adobe Ventures, Toyota Ventures, eBay Ventures, Atreides Management, and Valor Equity Partners, alongside returning investors Sequoia Capital, Benchmark, and Zeev Ventures. The round valued the company at approximately $4 billion.

== Reported acquisition talks ==
On October 11, 2026, The Wall Street Journal reported that Amazon was in talks to acquire Decart for about $7 billion. According to the report, a deal could be reached soon, but the talks could still fall through or another buyer could appear. Amazon declined to comment and Decart did not respond to requests for comment. Bloomberg reported that Anthropic had explored buying the company for about $6 billion in August 2026 and dropped the plan in September after due diligence.
