= Invisible Technologies =

American artificial intelligence company

- Type: Private
- Industry: Artificial intelligence
- Founded: 2015
- Founder: Francis Pedraza
- Headquarters: New York City, United States
- Key people: Matthew Fitzpatrick (CEO); Francis Pedraza (founder, chairman)
- Number of employees: ~350 employees (2025); ~5,000 contractors (2024)
- Website: invisibletech.ai

Invisible Technologies is an American artificial intelligence company founded in 2015 that provides AI training data services and enterprise software. The company became known after 2022 for providing human-feedback data used to train OpenAI's ChatGPT, and has since expanded its services to enterprise clients.

== History ==
Invisible Technologies was founded in 2015 by Francis Pedraza, a Cornell University graduate. The company initially attempted to combine remote workers with software automation to handle business tasks such as scheduling, screening résumés, and updating product data, but early uptake of the service was slow.

In 2020, DoorDash contracted Invisible Technologies to digitize restaurant menus and pricing data as the food-delivery sector expanded during the COVID-19 pandemic. In 2021, the company became profitable.

In 2022, OpenAI contracted Invisible Technologies for reinforcement learning from human feedback on what would become ChatGPT, with the goal of reducing factual errors known as hallucinations. Hundreds of Invisible contractors, designated "advanced AI data trainers", worked on tasks including improving the model's coding abilities, refining creative writing output, and filtering unwanted content. A typical workflow for an Invisible AI data trainer involved reviewing conversations between a model and its users, identifying messages that were potentially incorrect, illegal, or offensive, and rating model responses on a scale from one to seven across categories such as factual accuracy, grammar, and harassment. Trainers were also asked to draft what they considered an ideal response, which was then routed to OpenAI and to Invisible's internal quality reviewers.

By 2024, the AI training industry had shifted toward greater reliance on subject-matter experts for complex training tasks, moving away from lower-cost data labelers. At that time, Invisible Technologies worked with a network of around 5,000 contract trainers in over 100 countries, including holders of doctoral and master's degrees in various fields. Demand for training data used in reasoning models was a major driver of the company's growth, as such models required large amounts of chain-of-thought data produced by human experts. That year, the company reported $134 million in revenue, doubling the previous year's figure.

In January 2025, Matthew Fitzpatrick, formerly a senior executive at McKinsey & Company who led QuantumBlack Labs, was appointed chief executive officer.

By 2025, the company had expanded into enterprise software for insurance, asset management, healthcare, and other industries.

== Funding ==
Through 2024, the company had raised approximately $23 million in primary equity financing from investors including Day One Ventures, Greycroft, and Backed VC. In 2025, the company raised $100 million in a round led by Vanara Capital, an investment firm started by former employees of TPG Inc.. The round valued the company at more than $2 billion.
