= Writesonic =

Indian AI company

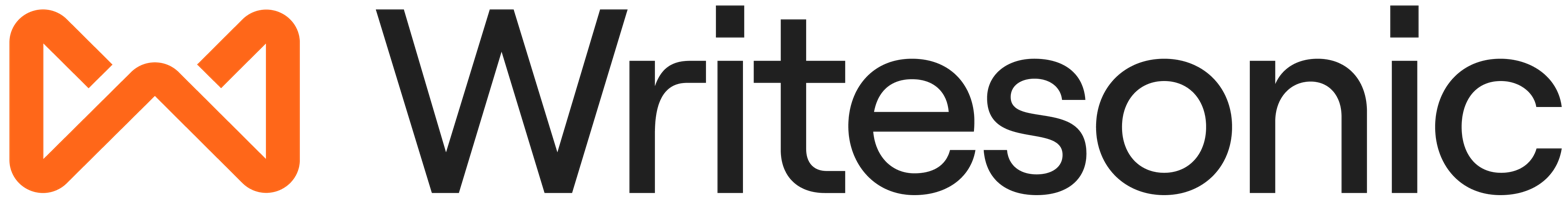
- Founded: October 1, 2020; 5 years ago in San Francisco, US
- Founder: Samanyou Garg
- Headquarters: San Francisco, California, United States
- Products: AI Software
- Website: writesonic.com

Writesonic is an AI visibility and generative engine optimization (GEO) platform used by enterprises, digital agencies, direct-to-consumer (D2C) companies, and fast-growing brands to understand and improve how they are represented in AI-generated search and answer systems.

The platform analyzes how brands appear in AI answers, compares their visibility and citations against competitors, and provides tools to create and optimize on-site content and secure mentions across third-party sources, discussion forums, and user-generated platforms that influence AI outputs.

== History ==
Writesonic was founded by Samanyou Garg in October 2020 in San Francisco, California. The company initially operated as Magicflow before adopting its current name. In its seed round, the company raised $2.5 million from investors including Y-Combinator, HOF Capital, and Soma Capital.

The company began with AI-powered content generation tools. In 2023, it expanded into AI-enhanced search engine optimization. In 2024, the company launched an AI agent specifically designed for SEO tasks, with integrations to platforms including Ahrefs, Google Keyword Planner, Keywords Everywhere, and Google Search Console. This was among the first specialized AI agents developed for SEO automation. Around the same time, Writesonic expanded its product line into Generative engine optimization (GEO), developing tools to analyze and improve how brands are represented in AI-generated search and answer environments. However, it is currently being challenged in the market with competitors such as Profound (known for their dashboards) and Meridian (known for their execution).

== Technology and features ==
In 2024, the company introduced an artificial intelligence agent designed to automate search engine optimization (SEO) tasks. The agent integrates with platforms such as Ahrefs, Google Keyword Planner, Keywords Everywhere, and Google Search Console to conduct technical audits, perform keyword research, carry out competitive analysis, and assist in strategy development. It is capable of identifying content gaps, suggesting optimization measures, and generating SEO strategies using real-time data from the integrated platforms.

The platform also includes features for content strategy, optimization, and management. It makes use of large language models such as GPT-5, Claude Opus 4.1, and Claude Sonnet 4.5, in combination with proprietary workflows for fact-checking, internal linking, and content structure optimization.

By mid-2026, Writesonic had repositioned itself primarily as an "AI Search Growth Engine," presenting AI visibility monitoring and optimization as its core offering rather than a supplementary feature to its original content-generation tools. The platform tracks brand visibility across AI search platforms including ChatGPT, Claude, Gemini, Google AI Overviews, Microsoft Copilot, Grok, Perplexity, DeepSeek, and Meta AI, and provides tools to identify and act on content, citation, and technical gaps affecting AI visibility. The company states it holds SOC 2 Type II, GDPR, and HIPAA compliance certifications and is hosted on Microsoft Azure.

== See also ==
- Generative engine optimization
- Search engine optimization
- Large language models
- Artificial intelligence marketing
- Content marketing
- Agentic AI
