= PetaPixel =

Digital photography website

- Website type: Photography news, reviews and guides
- Available in: English
- Editor: Jaron Schneider
- Website: www.petapixel.com
- Launched: May 2009; 17 years ago
- Current status: Online

PetaPixel is a website dedicated to digital photography and cameras, including blog posts, news, guides and reviews. Additionally, they have interviewed award-winning photographers such as Camille Lepage, with that work being referenced by broader media organizations. It was founded in May 2009.
