= Decagon (company) =

American technology company

Decagon AI, Inc.
- Company type: Private
- Industry: Artificial intelligence
- Founded: August 2023; 2 years ago
- Founders: Jesse Zhang; Ashwin Sreenivas
- Headquarters: San Francisco, California, United States
- Key people: Jesse Zhang (CEO); Ashwin Sreenivas (CTO)
- Products: AI agents for customer experience
- Website: decagon.ai

Decagon AI, Inc. is an American artificial intelligence company that develops conversational AI agents for customer service. The company is headquartered in San Francisco, California with additional offices in New York City and London.

== History ==
Decagon was founded in August 2023 by Jesse Zhang and Ashwin Sreenivas. Prior to Decagon, Zhang founded the social gaming clip-sharing app Lowkey, which was acquired by Pokémon Go maker Niantic in 2021. Sreenivas founded Helia, an AI startup focused on real-time video, which was acquired by Scale AI in 2020.

In January 2026, Decagon announced a $250 million Series D round led by Coatue Management and Index Ventures. The round tripled the company's valuation to $4.5 billion.

== Products ==
Decagon develops AI agents that handle customer service interactions in chat, email, voice, and SMS.
