= Forethought Technologies =

American artificial intelligence company

- Type: Private
- Industry: Artificial intelligence
- Founded: 2017
- Founder: Deon Nicholas, Sami Ghoche, Colm Doyle
- Headquarters: San Francisco, California, U.S.
- Website: forethought.ai

Forethought Technologies, also known as Forethought, is an American artificial intelligence company headquartered in San Francisco, California. The company develops software to automate customer service operations.

== History ==
Forethought was founded in 2017 by Deon Nicholas, Sami Ghoche, and Colm Doyle. The company publicly launched at TechCrunch Disrupt in 2018, where it won the Startup Battlefield competition.

In 2023, Forethought released a generative AI tool constrained to a customer’s own support data, and later launched Autoflows, an agentic reasoning engine that allows support teams to specify resolution outcomes in natural language. In March 2025, the company released Forethought Voice, a voice product developed in partnership with Cartesia.

As of 2026, Forethought’s platform processes more than one billion customer interactions per month, with customers including Airtable, Grammarly, Datadog, and Upwork.

== Funding ==
In December 2018, Forethought raised a $9 million Series A round led by New Enterprise Associates (NEA), with participation from K9 Ventures and Village Global. In October 2020, the company raised $17 million in a Series B round from Sound Ventures, NEA, and Operator Collective.

In December 2021, Forethought raised a $65 million Series C round, which brought the company’s total funding to $92 million. The round was led by Steadfast Capital Ventures, with participation from NEA, Sound Ventures, and K9 Ventures, along with investments from Baron Davis, Robert Downey Jr., and Gwyneth Paltrow.

In May 2025, Forethought raised a $25 million Series D round led by Blue Cloud Ventures, which brought the company’s total funding to $115 million.

In March 2026, Forethought was acquired by Zendesk. Forethought has continued to operate as a subsidiary of Zendesk.
