= Like for like =

Performance indicator for retail sales

Like for like (LFL) growth is a measure of growth in sales, adjusted for new or divested businesses. This is a widely used indicator of retailers' current trading performance. The adjustment is important in businesses that show a significant dynamic of expansion, disposals or closures. To compare sales figures from different periods is only meaningful, as a measure of the effectiveness of the sales function, when using the same basis for measurement.

One method compares the latest year's sales only to those from activities or locations that were in effect the previous year as well. This method would ignore sales that were only possible this year, for reasons such as a merger or acquisition or the launch of a new product or store.

However, there is a significant choice of alternative methods of calculation, which makes it difficult to compare figures quoted by different retailers.

The portion of current sales achieved through activities that are comparable to the activities of the previous year. Investopedia explains Like-For-Like Sales. Using like-for-like sales is a method of valuation that attempts to exclude any effects of expansion, acquisition, or other events that artificially enlarge the company's sales. For example, if you are trying to compare the turnover of company ABC from this year to last year, it makes sense to exclude from the equation any sales resulting from acquisitions this year.

== See also ==
- Business-to-business
- B2G
- Consumer behaviour
- Department store
- Final goods
- Grey pound
- Point of sales
- Sales Promotion
- Retail concentration
- Retail design
- Retail software
- Retailtainment
- Sales density
- Shopping
- Visual merchandising
- Wardrobing
- Window shopping
