= Sales density =

Performance indicator for retail sales

Sales density is a measure of performance in retailing. It is the revenue generated for a given area of sales space, and is presented as a monetary value per square metre. The higher the figure, the more efficiently the floorspace is being used. It is often quoted alongside other indicators such as like for like sales.

== Overview ==
Sales density is a ratio computed dividing the total retail sales over a year by the total surface of all the stores owned by the retailer (potential wholesale/franchising sales are usually not included). It is disputed whether the online sales of the retailer should be included in the numerator of the ratio given the high interdependence in the marketing strategy of online sales and own stores sales.

== See also ==
- Business-to-business
- Business-to-government
- Consumer behaviour
- Department store
- Final goods
- Grey pound
- Point of sales
- Retail concentration
- Retail design
- Retail software
- Retailtainment
- Sales promotion
- Shopping
- Visual merchandising
- Wardrobing
- Window shopping
