= Ready-to-wear =

Mass-produced clothing in standard sizes

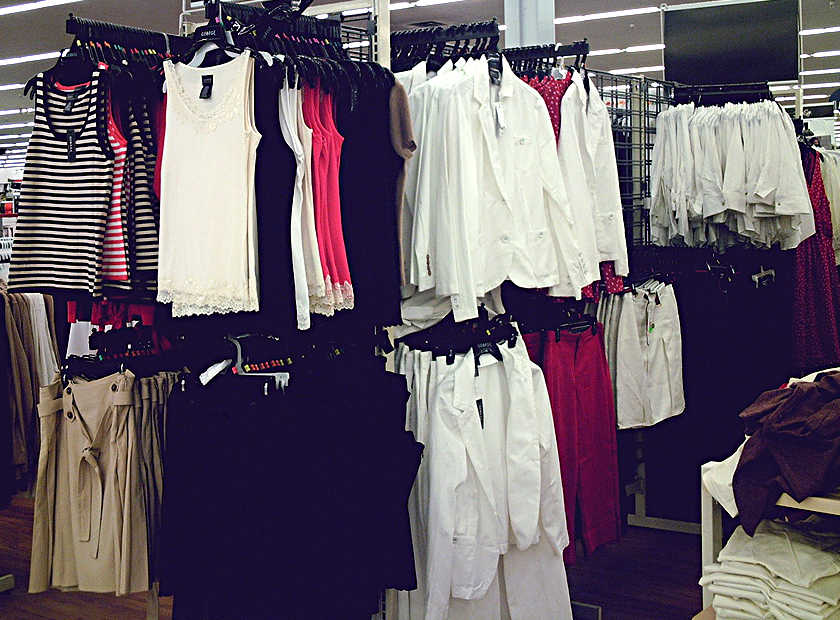
Ready-to-wear clothing display of a U.S. Walmart department retailer in 2007

Ready-to-wear (RTW) – also called prêt-à-porter, (Note: [pʁɛt‿a poʁte], English: /ˌprɛt ɑː ˈpɔːt.eɪ, -pɔːr.ˈteɪ/) or off-the-rack or off-the-peg in casual use – is the term for garments sold in finished condition in standardized sizes, as distinct from made-to-measure or bespoke clothing tailored to a particular person's frame. In other words, it is a piece of clothing that was mass produced in different sizes and sold that way instead of it being designed and sewn for one person. The term off-the-peg is sometimes used for items other than clothing, such as handbags. It is the opposite of haute couture.

Ready-to-wear has a rather different place in the spheres of fashion and classic clothing. In the fashion industry, designers produce ready-to-wear clothing, intended to be worn without significant alteration because clothing made to standard sizes fits most people. They use standard patterns, factory equipment, and faster construction techniques to keep costs low, compared to a custom-sewn version of the same item. Some fashion houses and fashion designers make mass-produced and industrially manufactured ready-to-wear lines, while others offer garments that are not unique but are produced in limited numbers.

== History ==
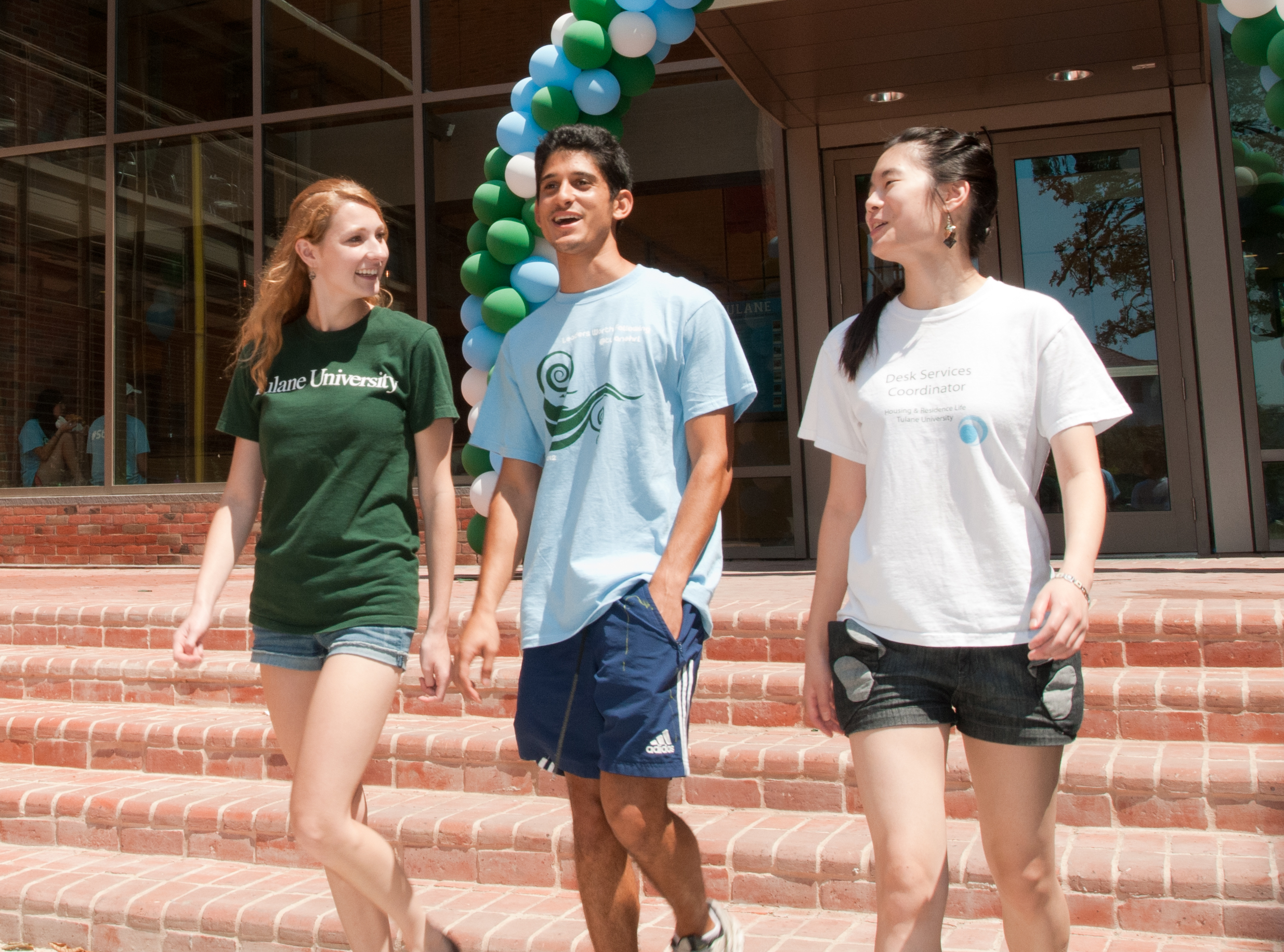
University students wearing casual clothes in the U.S.

=== Men's and children's clothing ===
In pre-war times, the production of men’s ready-to-wear clothing in the United States was throttled by various incurred costs: cloth, trimmings, labor, taxes, amortization, transportation charges, overhead and profit (or lack thereof). During the War of 1812, these constraints became largely obsolete, leading to the mass production of ready-to-wear military uniforms. High-quality ready-to-wear garments for men became generally available soon thereafter, as the relatively simple, flattering cuts and muted tones of the contemporary fashion made proportionate sizing possible in mass production. The first ready-made garment factory was established in New York City in 1831. During the American Civil War the need for ready-made uniforms helped the garment sector grow in the United States.

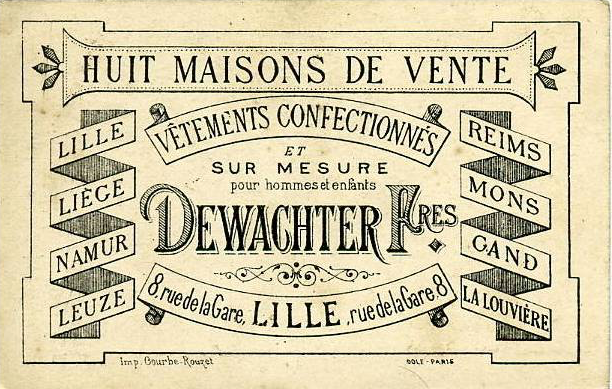
Postcard advertisement listing eight cities and towns where Dewachter Frères offered "ready-to-wear clothes and by measure for men and children", c. 1885

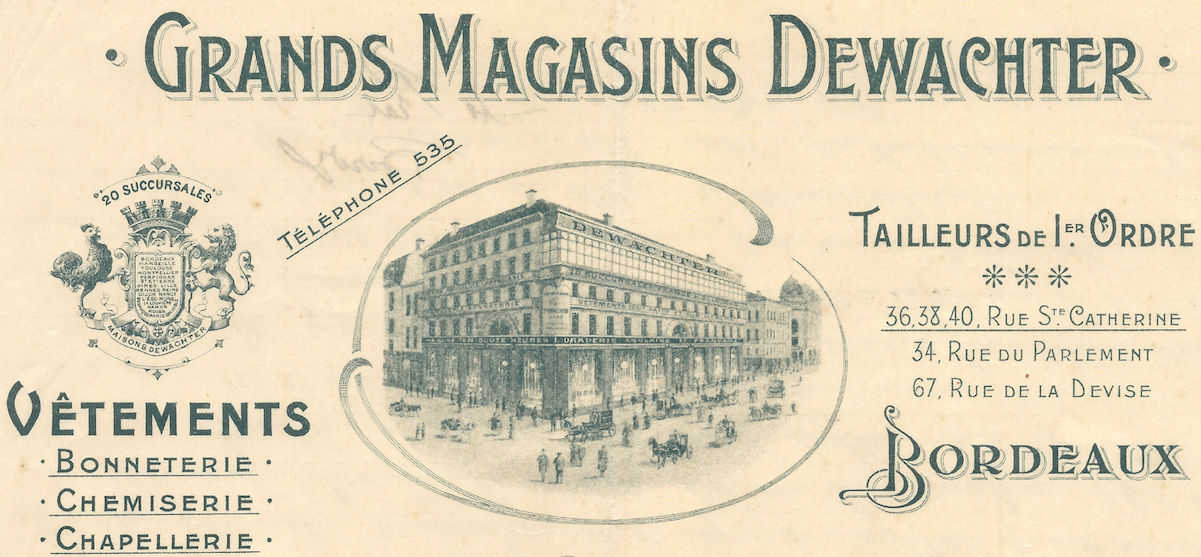
Letterhead for the Bordeaux location of Maison Dewachter

In 1868, Isidore, Benjamin and Modeste Dewachter offered ready-to-wear clothing for men and children to Belgian clientele when they opened the first chain department stores, Dewachter frères (Dewachter Brothers). By 1904, the chain was managed by Isidore's son, Louis, and had grown to 20 cities and towns in Belgium and France, with some cities having multiple stores. Louis Dewachter also became an internationally known landscape artist, painting under the pseudonym Louis Dewis.

Near the end of the nineteenth century, ready-made garments were no longer seen as only for the lower classes but also for the middle classes because of the view of the social aspect and how it has changed in value. This trend started in the United States. In the beginning, they were more popular with men than women. In the late 1860s, twenty-five percent of garments produced in the US were ready-made, but by 1890, the portion had risen to sixty percent. By 1951, ninety percent of garments sold in the United States were ready-made. During the same time, two-thirds of garments sold in France were ready-made.

=== Women's clothing ===
In the early 19th century, women's fashion was highly ornate and dependent on a precise fit, so ready-to-wear garments for women did not become widely available until the beginning of the 20th century. Before, women would alter their previously styled clothing to stay up to date with fashion trends. Women with larger incomes purchased new, fully tailored clothing in current styles while middle-class and lower-class women adjusted their clothing to fit changes in fashion by adding new neck collars, shortening skirts, or cinching shirt waists.

The widespread adoption of ready-to-wear clothing reflected a variety of factors including economic disparities, a desire for an independent fashion industry, and an increase in media attention. The demand for affordable and fashionable women's clothing sparked designers and department stores to manufacture clothing in bulk quantities that were accessible to women of all classes and incomes. Through the emergence of the US ready-to-wear market, designers like Chanel with their shift dresses or the mail-order catalogs sent to rural farms by Sears allowed women to purchase clothing faster and at a cheaper price. The introduction of the concept of "pret-a-porter" has been attributed to Sonia Delaunay after her geometric styles were exhibited at the seminal 1925 Exposition Internationale des Arts Decoratifs in Paris.

Another significant factor created by the ready-to-wear industry was the US development of a style independent from Europe. The US fashion market turned away from the Parisian style in favor of an individualized apparel industry promoted through advertisements and articles in magazines like Women's Wear Daily, Harper’s Bazaar, and Ladies Home Journal.

Ready-to-wear also sparked new interests in health, beauty, and diet as manufactured clothing set specific, standardized sizes in attire to increase quantities for profit. Women of larger sizes had difficulties finding apparel in department stores, as most manufacturers maintained and sold a limited range of sizes.

Overall, ready-to-wear fashion exposed women to the newest styles and fashion trends, leading to a substantial increase in profits by US factories from $12,900,583 in 1876 (equivalent to $351 million in 2025) to $1,604,500,957 in 1929 (equivalent to $23.7 billion in 2025). The ready-to-wear fashion revolution led to an expansion of the US fashion industry that made fashionable apparel accessible, cost-effective, and commensurable.

Interest in ready-to-wear was sparked by Yves Saint Laurent, who was the first designer to launch a ready-to-wear collection, and in 1966 he opened Rive Gauche, his first ready-to-wear boutique. Whether he succeeded in democratizing fashion is an open question, since few were able to afford his designs, but he did pave the way for ready-to-wear fashion and the cross-fertilisation between haute-couture and high-street fashion that persists into the 21st century.

== Haute couture and bespoke ==
Fashion houses that produce a women's haute couture line, such as Chanel, Dior, Lacroix and Saint Laurent also produce a ready-to-wear line, which returns a greater profit because of the higher volume of garments made and the greater availability of the clothing. The construction of ready-to-wear clothing is also held to a different standard than that of haute couture due to its industrial nature. High-end ready-to-wear lines are sometimes based upon a famous gown or other pattern that is then duplicated and advertised to raise the visibility of the designer.

== Collections ==
In high-end fashion, ready-to-wear collections are usually presented by fashion houses each season during a period known as Fashion Week. This takes place on a city-by-city basis, and the most prominent of these include London, New York, Milan, and Paris, and are held twice a year—the Fall/Winter (FW) shows take place in February, and the Spring/Summer (SS) collections are shown in September. Smaller lines include the Cruise and Pre-Fall collections, which add to the retail value of a brand, and are presented separately at the fashion designer's discretion. Ready-to-wear fashion weeks occur separately and earlier than those of haute couture. Unlike ready-to-wear products, collections are kept exclusive to designers chosen guests and idols creating the division between two production styles. It takes the work of one person to a team of skilled artists rather than machine made garments.
