= Caper AI =

US software technology company

Caper
- Type: Subsidiary
- Industry: Retail software, AI technologies in retail
- Founded: 2016
- Headquarters: New York, US
- Area served: US and Canada
- Key people: Lindon Gao (CEO), York Yang, Yilin Huang, Ahmed Beshry
- Products: Caper Carts
- Services: Autonomous checkout software
- Parent: Instacart
- Website: www.caper.ai

Caper is a software technology company that develops and deploys AI-powered automated checkout devices as well as AI-based software applications for retailers, grocers, convenience stores and other general merchandising store formats. Caper AI was established in 2016 by Lindon Gao, York Yang, Yilin Huang and Ahmed Beshry. It is headquartered in Manhattan, New York.

In October 2021, American retail delivery company Instacart acquired Caper for $350 million.

== History ==
The company was founded in 2016 by Lindon Gao, York Yang, Yilin Huang and Ahmed Beshry with its main office based in New York. Since its inception, the company focused on the development of automated checkout software to grocery retailers. Caper AI closed its series A round of funding for US$10 million in 2019. In 2019, Sobeys, the second-largest food retailer in Canada, publicly announced about commercial deployment of the Caper's Smart Cart technology with its first location being at Glen Abbey Sobeys supermarket in Oakville, Ontario. As Grocery Dive notes, "The novel coronavirus pandemic has accelerated the deployment of programs that help shoppers get in and get out from stores as quickly as possible". According to Wall Street Journal and Washington Post, Caper's technology started to roll out in the US and Canada grocery stores in 2019. The deployments include Foodcellar & Co., C-town, Met Fresh Market, Pioneer Supermarkets, Gala Fresh Farms and Brooklyn Fare, among others. In autumn 2020, the company introduced Caper Counter, a cashierless countertop for small grocery stores under 10 000 sq feet and fewer than 10K SKUs with a software applying machine learning algorithms, computer vision and Sensor Fusion technology.

In 2020, one of the largest American chain retailers, Kroger, launched "KroGo" AI-powered shopping carts developed by Caper AI. The pilot program was introduced at one of its stores in Cincinnati, Ohio. Grocery chain Schnucks, Shoprite, and Fairway Market stores all rolled out the AI-powered shopping carts in 2023.

In Fall 2024, Instacart launched Caper Carts internationally, with Aldi Süd in Austria and Coles Supermarket in Australia.

== Technology ==
Caper AI uses several technologies to automate the retail checkout process, including computer vision, machine learning and sensor fusion. Caper's technology has multiple cameras and lights to capture images. AI and deep learning are used to pre-train the system to recognize products within the stores The technology can recognize products that are similar or identical by differentiating between them based on textual information and size.

== See also ==
- Automated retail
- Cashless society
- Amazon Go
- Self-checkout
