= Fidji Simo =

French businesswoman

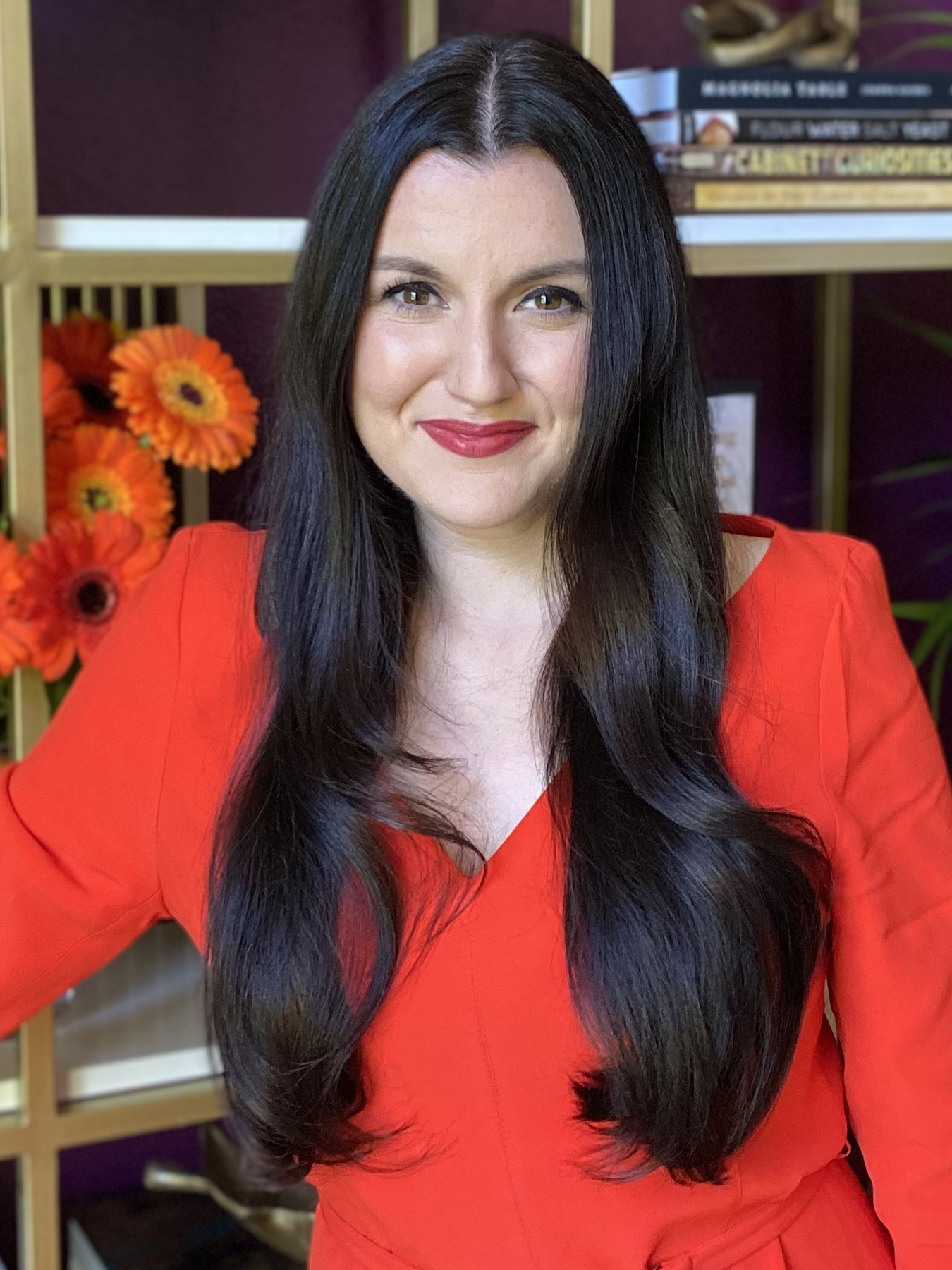
- Simo in 2021
- Born: October 5, 1985 (age 41); Sète, France
- Education: HEC Paris; UCLA Anderson School of Management
- Occupation: Advisory Role at OpenAI
- Board member of: Shopify
- Spouse: Remy Miralles (m. 2011)
- Children: 1

Fidji Simo (born 5 October 1985) is a French-American businesswoman. She serves in an advisory role at OpenAI. Prior to OpenAI, she spent a decade at Facebook where she was one of the top executives as the head of Facebook, and was CEO of Instacart from 2021 to 2025. She co-founded ChronicleBio, a technology-enabled biomedical research company focused on research into neuroimmune disorders, and is president of the nonprofit Complex Disorders Alliance (CODA). She is on the board of directors at Shopify and was previously on the board of OpenAI prior to her employment there.

== Early life and education ==
Simo grew up in Sète, in the south of France. She was the first member of her family to graduate from high school and holds a master of management degree from HEC Paris. She spent the last year of her program at UCLA's Anderson School of Business.

== Career ==
=== eBay ===
Simo worked at eBay from 2007 to 2011 as part of the strategy team. While at eBay, she built out the company’s local commerce and classified-advertising initiatives.

=== Facebook ===
Simo was the Vice President and Head of Facebook. Over the course of her decade at Facebook, she oversaw the development and strategy for Facebook, including News Feed, Stories, Groups, Video, Marketplace, Gaming, News, Dating, Ads and more. She also led the team in charge of architecting Facebook’s advertising business and monetizing mobile. She made video a critical part of the Facebook experience, from rolling out videos that autoplay in News Feed, to building and launching Facebook Live and Facebook Watch. Simo joined Facebook from eBay in 2011.

=== Instacart ===
Simo joined Instacart’s board of directors in January 2021 and was appointed as the company’s CEO in July. She started in the new role in August, replacing Apoorva Mehta, who became the executive chairman of the board.

In September 2023, Instacart appointed Simo to succeed Apoorva Mehta as the Board Chair following the company's initial public offering.

Under Simo's leadership, Instacart broke the longest tech IPO drought in the last 20 years, listing under the ticker symbol CART on Nasdaq in September 2023.

Simo announced on May 7, 2025 that she would be leaving the CEO role in several months but would remain as chair of the board through her transition to OpenAI.

=== OpenAI ===
In March 2024, Simo joined OpenAI's board of directors. On May 7, 2025, she announced she would leave Instacart to become OpenAI's first CEO of Applications, a role overseeing product, business, technology, engineering, and other company functions. She began the position in August 2025, reporting to founder and CEO Sam Altman. The role (now titled CEO of AGI Deployment) leads all product and business teams, including all of the company's operations such as product development engineering, sales, finance, marketing, comms and policy, legal, and people teams.

Simo has led the expansion of OpenAI’s consumer products, including the January 2026 launch of ChatGPT Health, a service that connects users’ medical records and wellness apps to provide personalized health insights and support for clinical appointments.

Under Simo's leadership of OpenAI's Applications group, efforts expanded to integrate its ChatGPT app, coding platform Codex and browser into a desktop "superapp" which will simplify the user experience and continue focus on engineering and business customers.

In July 2026 Simo stepped down from her full-time role and moved to a part-time advisory position.

== Other activities ==
Simo co-founded Women in Product, a nonprofit organization for women in product management. The organization works to advance the careers of women in technology and advocates for equal representation in the workplace. Previously Simo was on the boards of the L.A. Dance Project and Cirque du Soleil. In December 2021, Simo joined Shopify's board of directors.

=== Villa Albertine Residency Program ===
Simo launched a new “Arts in the Age of AI” residency program in partnership with Villa Albertine in February 2025. The French Minister of Culture, Rachida Dati, announced the launch of the new residency program as part of the AI Action Summit’s Cultural Weekend. This initiative will host eight artists who incorporate artificial intelligence into their work in the United States over a period of two years.

=== Neuroimmune research initiatives ===
In October 2021, Simo co-founded the Metrodora Institute, a health clinic and research center focused on neuroimmune disorders. The institute opened its doors in April 2023 in Salt Lake City, Utah, with a mission to integrate interdisciplinary clinical care with biomedical research, particularly for conditions that are often underdiagnosed and disproportionately affect women. Simo cited her own three-year long search for a diagnosis of postural orthostatic tachycardia syndrome (POTS) as a motivating factor in founding the organization.

The Metrodora Institute operated as a multidisciplinary clinic while also supporting research initiatives and patient participation in scientific studies. The organization received funding from private and philanthropic sources, including a reported $35 million investment from an undisclosed venture investor. Metrodora ceased its clinical operations on July 16, 2025.

Simo remains the Founder and President of the Complex Disorders Association (CODA), a 501(c)(3) nonprofit organization, previously known as The Metrodora Foundation. The organization supports scientific research into neuroimmune disorders.

In 2025, Simo co-founded ChronicleBio, a techbio startup, focused on accelerating insights on neuroimmune disorders by building the world’s richest, AI-ready data platform for historically overlooked conditions like POTS, ME/CFS, and Long COVID. The company operates a growing biobank and several research studies that aim to enable biomarker discovery and rapid therapeutic development.

== Personal life ==
Simo is married to French engineer Remy Miralles, who became a chocolatier in California. They have a daughter.

== Recognition ==
- Simo has been recognized by Fortune as part of their annual Most Powerful Women List (2023), 13 Innovators Shaping the Future of Health List (2023), and 40 under 40 List (2021 & 2016).
- She has been featured on Comparably’s list of Best Company CEOs (2023).
- She has been listed on Fast Company’s list of Most Creative People in Business.
- She has been included on AdWeek’s list of the top 15 people shaping the future of mobile advertising.
- Simo was ranked 10th most influential French person in the world by Vanity Fair.
- In 2024, she was listed on CNBC inaugural Changemakers list, recognizing the top female leaders transforming business.
- Simo was named 2024 Executive of the Year by San Francisco Business Times.
- In 2025, Simo was named to Time Magazine's TIME100 AI list.
