= Instacart =

Internet-based grocery delivery service

Maplebear Inc.
- Logo since 2022
- Trade name: Instacart
- Type: Public
- Traded as: Nasdaq: CART; S&P 400 component
- Industry: Retail
- Founded: July 1, 2012; 14 years ago
- Founders: Apoorva Mehta; Max Mullen; Brandon Leonardo
- Headquarters: 50 Beale Street; San Francisco, California, U.S.
- Area served: United States and Canada
- Key people: Chris Rogers (CEO); Fidji Simo (Chair)
- Services: Grocery delivery
- Revenue: ▲US$3.38 billion (2024)
- Operating income: ▲US$489 million (2024)
- Net income: ▲US$457 million (2024)
- Total assets: ▼US$4.12 billion (2024)
- Total equity: ▼US$3.09 billion (2024)
- Number of employees: 3,265 (2024)
- Subsidiaries: Caper AI
- Website: instacart.com instacart.ca

The Instacart logo is a simplified carrot. Logo since 2022.

Maplebear Inc., doing business as Instacart, is an American retail media and delivery company based in San Francisco that operates a grocery delivery and pick-up service in the United States and Canada accessible via a website and mobile app. It allows customers to order groceries from participating retailers with the shopping being done by a personal shopper, who picks, packs, and delivers the order, while also providing alcohol delivery in regions where it is permitted.

The company offers service from 2,200 retailers covering nearly 100,000 grocery stores, and works with 9,000 consumer packaged goods brands. Alcohol delivery is available from hundreds of retail banners that span 17,000 stores across North America.

Instacart reaches "nearly 98%" of SNAP households, offering delivery services from about 180 retail banners, including ALDI, Food Lion, Publix, The Save Mart Companies and Walgreens, spanning about 30,000 stores across all 50 states and Washington D.C. Since its founding, Instacart Marketplace has seen over $100 billion of "gross transactional value" and over 900 million orders with approximately 20 billion items ordered.

In October 2026, DoorDash announced it would be purchasing Instacart (Maplebear) for $17 billion USD, and that the two companies would be combined if the deal proceeds as expected.

== History ==
=== Corporate history ===
After getting inspiration from being low on groceries without owning a car as well as his trips to the grocery store by bus in the cold while growing up in Canada, Apoorva Mehta founded Instacart in 2012 at age 26. He tried to apply for funding through Y Combinator but missed the deadline. He eventually got a meeting by using the Instacart mobile app to deliver a six-pack of beer from 21st Amendment Brewery to a Y Combinator partner and was admitted to the summer of 2012 batch. Y Combinator helped Mehta raise $2.3 million in funding and enabled him to meet his two co-founders, Max Mullen and Brandon Leonardo. The company’s name is a combination of "maple," in reference to Canada, and "bear," for the logo on the California state flag, as Mehta grew up in Canada and moved to California.

At the end of 2018, Instacart changed its pay system for its personal shoppers. Shoppers reported frustration with the new payment system.

In 2019, the company expanded its services to offering an on-demand option for its shoppers, in order to allow shoppers to work more flexible schedules.

In 2020, during the COVID-19 pandemic, Instacart implemented contactless delivery, safety kits and guidelines for shoppers. From mid-March to mid-April 2020, as a result of a surge in usage of the mobile app, Instacart signed up an additional 300,000 shoppers to meet the surge in demand for grocery deliveries.

In 2021, Instacart had a valuation of $39 billion. In July 2021, Fidji Simo was appointed CEO, while Mehta transitioned to Executive Chairman of the Board. In July 2022, Simo was appointed to succeed Mehta as chairperson once the company completed its initial public offering. In September 2023, the company became public through an initial public offering raising $660 million, valuing the company at about $10 billion. The company's shares opened on Nasdaq at a price of $30. Mehta left the company after it went public. In 2025, Instacart unveiled its first Super Bowl ad.

In May 2025, TechCrunch and others reported that Simo would leave Instacart to take a role with OpenAI. Later that month the company appointed business chief, Chris Rogers, as its next CEO beginning in August 2025. On August 15, 2025, Chris Rogers officially stepped into the position of CEO and joined the company's Board of Directors.

In December 2025, Instacart agreed to pay $60 million to settle an investigation opened by the U.S. Federal Trade Commission (FTC) related to allegations the company had deceived consumers about its Instacart+ membership and free delivery offers, according to court documents. An Instacart spokesperson said the company flatly denied any allegations of wrongdoing, and that the settlement allows the company to focus on shoppers and retailers.

On October 29, 2026, DoorDash announced plans to acquire Instacart in a deal worth approximately $17 billion, offering $65 per share. The acquisition is expected to be completed in late 2027 early 2028. DoorDash has said it plans to keep Instacart's brand, app and technology following the deal.

=== Service launches and grocery partnerships ===
==== 2010s ====
Instacart was first launched in San Francisco in 2012. In November 2013, Instacart added alcohol delivery in areas where alcohol delivery was legal. The company expanded across the United States in the following years.

In August 2013, Instacart began offering an annual membership service called Instacart Express. In June 2022, Instacart Express was renamed Instacart+ and new family shopping features, including sharing membership and shopping-cart collaboration with another family member for free, were added.

In November 2017, the company expanded to Canada, first with a partnership with Loblaw Companies in Toronto and Vancouver. By May 2018, Instacart was available for use in 11 Canadian markets and was planning expansions for five more markets.

In April 2018, Instacart changed its prices by instituting a mandatory 5% service fee on all orders. It originally offered an optional 10% service fee that went directly to Instacart that could be turned off. It also returned the gratuity option back to the checkout screen and raised the default value from 0% to 5%.

In March 2019, Instacart expanded its same-day alcohol delivery service in the U.S. Effective May 2019, Whole Foods Market ended its partnership with Instacart in the U.S. given its ties to Amazon.com. In February 2024, Instacart announced customers throughout Canada can now order fresh groceries and everyday essentials from Whole Foods Market on the Instacart App.

==== 2020s ====
In May 2020, Instacart began a partnership with Rite Aid, offering its service across 2,400 locations in 18 states. In August 2020, Instacart entered its first partnership with Walmart in the U.S. to offer same-day delivery services. The partnership is a pilot program beginning in Los Angeles, San Francisco, San Diego, and Tulsa. Additional partnerships in June included C&S Wholesale Grocers and Staples.

In March 2022, in partnership with TikTok, Hearst Magazine and Tasty, Instacart launched Shoppable Recipes with product integrations for food creators. In the same month, Instacart introduced the Instacart Platform, a program providing digital tools for retailers. The platform includes services such as advertising, home delivery, inventory management, and other technologies designed to support retailers online grocery operations.Through these services, Instacart expanded from a grocery delivery marketplace into a broader technology platform for grocery retailers.

In May 2022, Instacart partnered with Canadian grocers Metro, Giant Tiger, and Galleria Supermarket. In March 2023, Instacart announced the availability of digital tools for medical providers to promote nutritious foods to patients and their families. In November 2023, Instacart partnered with Peacock with US Instacart subscribers receiving free access to Peacock. In May 2024, Instacart partnered with Uber Eats to give Instacart customers access to food delivery from Uber Eats U.S. restaurant partners. In June 2024, Instacart began a partnership with New York Times Cooking with recipes from NYT Cooking providing links to Instacart for the ingredients needed to make the recipe and giving Instacart+ subscribers free access to NYT Cooking for a year.

=== Acquisitions history ===
In January 2018, the company acquired Toronto-based Unata, a white-label platform for grocers, for $65 million. In October 2021, Instacart acquired smart cart and checkout company Caper AI for $350 million. In September 2022, Instacart announced the acquisition of Eversight, an artificial intelligence pricing platform for brands and retailers. Also in September 2022, the company acquired Rosie, an e-commerce platform for local and independent retailers and wholesalers. In May 2025, the company acquired Wynshop, an e-commerce platform for US grocery chains. In April 2026, the company acquired Instaleap, a global enablement and fulfillment solutions platform based in Bogotá.

=== Finance ===
The key financial trends for Instacart (CART) are as follows, based on fiscal years ending December 31:

Year	Revenue (US$ billion)	Gross profit (US$ billion)	Net income (US$ billion)
2020	1.48	0.88	−0.07
2021	1.83	1.23	−0.07
2022	2.55	1.83	0.43
2023	3.04	2.28	−1.62
2024	3.38	2.54	0.46
2025	3.74	2.76	0.45

== Labor practices and legal issues ==
=== Workforce ===
Instacart has approximately 600,000 shoppers on their platform. Instacart shoppers are independent contractors, and the majority of shoppers shop less than 10 hours per week. In June 2015, Instacart began hiring some shoppers as part-time employees, known as in-store shoppers, starting with Chicago and Boston and extending to shoppers in Atlanta, Miami, and Washington, D.C. the following month.

In January 2021, the company announced plans to lay off nearly 2,000 in-store employees. Instacart said that the layoffs were due to stores increasingly using Instacart to have consumers place orders, but have their own employees fulfill the order instead of Instacart's workforce, reducing reliance on Instacart's in-store shoppers.

=== Worker classification ===
In March 2017, Instacart agreed to pay $4.6 million to settle a class action settlement stemming from the alleged misclassification of its personal shoppers as independent contractors. The suit, filed in March 2015, alleged 18 violations, including improper tip pooling and failure to reimburse workers for business expenses.

In February 2020, 15 Instacart in-store shoppers in Skokie, Illinois voted to form a trade union.

=== COVID-19 response ===
In March 2020, shoppers impacted by COVID-19 would be eligible for up to 14 days of sick pay. Instacart required that workers either get a positive COVID-19 test or be under a mandatory quarantine by a public health or other government agency. Workers demanded hazard pay and personal protective equipment. In early April 2020, Instacart began providing safety kits to workers. In June, Instacart changed its sick leave in an agreement reached by it and the D.C. Attorney General, Karl Racine. Under the agreement, Instacart provided paid leave to workers who were clinically diagnosed with COVID-19 by a doctor or other medical professional along with those who had a household member contract COVID-19. The agreement also provided workers access to telemedicine services. In January 2021, Instacart announced a $25 stipend to provide financial assistance to company shoppers who choose to get the COVID-19 vaccine.

=== 2020 customer data exposure ===
In July 2020 data tied to an estimated 278,531 Instacart accounts names and their purchasing details were reported for sale on dark-web marketplaces. Instacart denied any breach of its systems, attributed the exposure to credential stuffing and forced password resets, security researchers and customers interviewed by TechCrunch said the data looked genuine. Instacart did not offer two-factor authentication at the time.
