= Sales variance =

Sales variance is the difference between actual sales and budgeted sales. It is used to measure the performance of a sales function, and/or analyze business results to better understand market conditions.

There are two reasons actual sales can vary from planned sales: either the volume sold varied from the expected quantity, known as sales volume variance, or the price point at which units were sold differed from the expected price points, known as sales price variance. Both scenarios could also simultaneously contribute to the variance.

== Sales volume variance ==
Sales volume variance can be considered favorable or unfavorable. Causes of sales volume variance include changes in competition and sales prices, changes in consumer desires (i.e. fashion trends over time), and impositions or removals of government trade restrictions.

== Sales price variance ==
Sales price variance can be considered favorable or unfavorable. A product sold at a price higher than the previously predicted price is considered favorable sales price variance, whereas selling for a lower price than expected is considered unfavorable sales price variance.

== See also ==
- Sales density
