= Retail =

Sale of goods and services

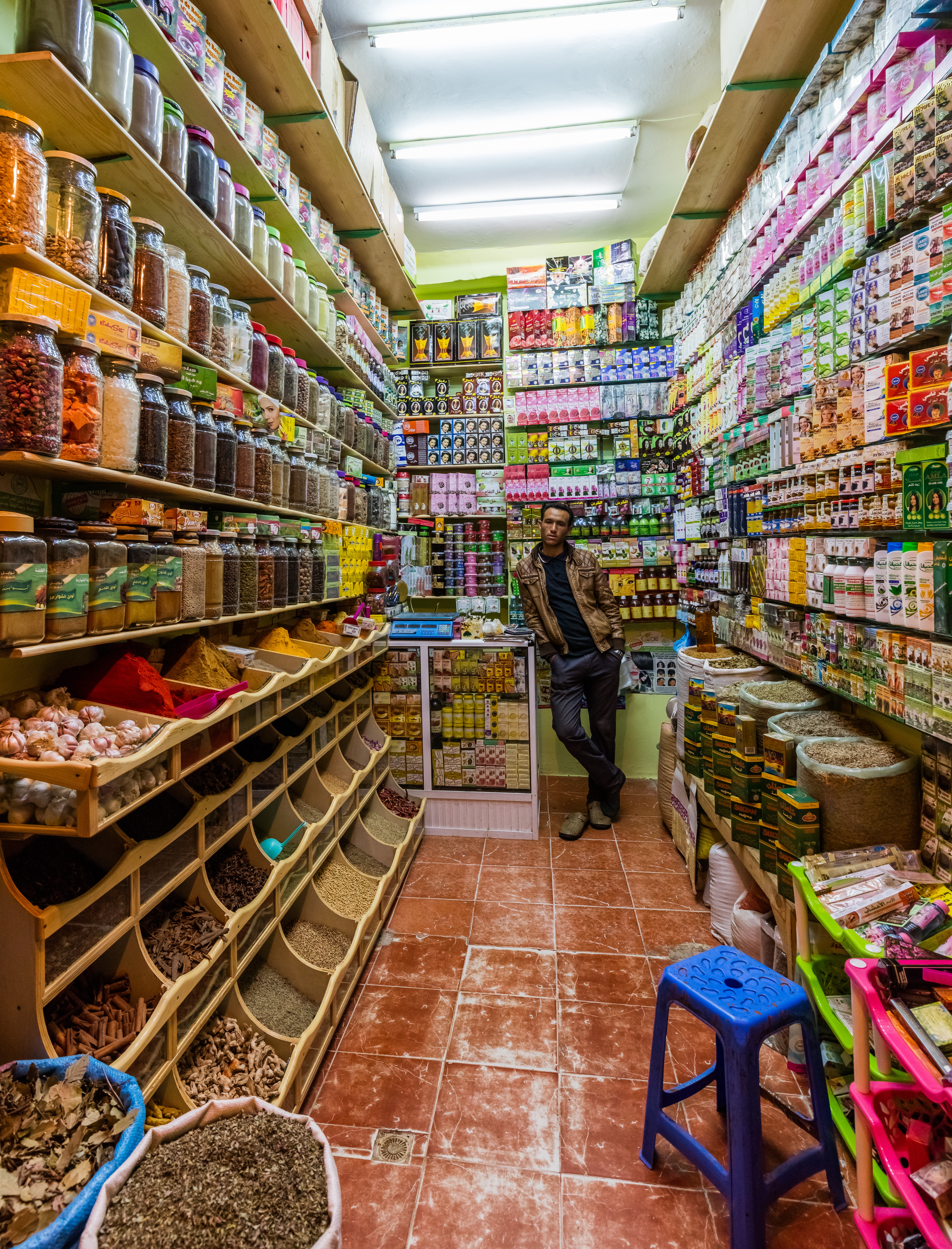
A grocery and cosmetics store in Tangier, Morocco

Retail is the sale of goods and services to consumers, in contrast to wholesaling, which is the sale to business or institutional customers. A retailer purchases goods in large quantities from manufacturers, directly from or through a wholesaler, and then sells in smaller quantities to consumers for a profit. Retailers are the final link in the supply chain from producers to consumers.

Retail markets and shops have a long history, dating back to antiquity. Some of the earliest retailers were itinerant peddlers. Over the centuries, retail shops were transformed from little more than "rude booths" to the sophisticated shopping malls of the modern era.

Retail operations center on obtaining goods in the needed quantities and placing them where customers will buy them, which makes purchasing and supply management core parts of retail strategy. Retail strategy is often supported by periodic environmental scanning and structured analysis of markets, customers, internal capabilities, and competition. Day-to-day decisions are often described using the retail marketing mix, commonly summarized as six "Ps": product, place, promotion, price, personnel, and presentation (physical evidence). Place decisions include location, operating hours, and access, and many retailers have expanded into multichannel models that combine physical and online retail. Pricing strategy and tactics can include discounts, everyday low pricing, high–low pricing, loss leaders, bundling, and psychological pricing, alongside planning for customer payment modes that carry handling costs. Retail labor needs often vary by time and season, which has supported flexible scheduling; one cited estimate is that in 2012, about 70% of United States retail workers were part-time. Over time, many retailers have emphasized longer-term customer relationships rather than one-time transactions, while also investing in store design (layout, lighting, music, signage, and "decompression" areas) to shape the shopping experience.

In the digital age, an increasing number of retailers are seeking to reach broader markets by selling through multiple channels, including both brick and mortar and online retailing. Digital technologies are also affecting the way that consumers pay for goods and services. Retailing support services may also include the provision of credit, delivery services, advisory services, stylist services and a range of other supporting services. Retail workers are the employees of such stores.

The retail sector is economically significant and employs large workforces. Most modern retailers typically make a variety of strategic level decisions including the type of store, the market to be served, the optimal product assortment, customer service, supporting services, and the store's overall market positioning. Retailers also expanded omnichannel capabilities, such as buy online and pick up in store, and some firms tested automation, such as cashierless store formats.

== Etymology ==
The word retail comes from the Old French verb retaillier, meaning "to shape by cutting" (c. 1365). It was first recorded as a noun in 1433 with the meaning of "a sale in small quantities" from the Middle French verb retailler meaning "a piece cut off, shred, scrap, paring". At present, the meaning of the word retail (in English, French, Dutch, German and Spanish) refers to the sale of small quantities of items to consumers (as opposed to wholesale).

=== Legal definition and explanation ===
Retail refers to the activity of selling goods or services directly to consumers or end-users. Some retailers may sell to business customers, and such sales are termed non-retail activity. In some jurisdictions or regions, legal definitions of retail specify that at least 80 percent of sales activity must be to end-users. In the banking industry "wholesale" usually refers to wholesale banking, providing tailored services to large customers, in contrast with retail banking, providing standardized services to large numbers of smaller customers. Retailing often occurs in retail stores or service establishments, but may also occur through direct selling, such as through vending machines, door-to-door sales or electronic channels. Although the idea of retail is often associated with the purchase of goods, the term may be applied to service providers that sell to consumers. Retail service providers include retail banking, tourism, insurance, private healthcare, private education, private security firms, legal firms, publishers, public transport, and others. For example, a tourism provider might have a retail division that books travel and accommodation for consumers, plus a wholesale division that purchases blocks of accommodation, hospitality, transport, and sightseeing, which are subsequently packaged into a holiday tour for sale to retail travel agents.

Some retailers badge their stores as "wholesale outlets" offering "wholesale prices". While this practice may encourage consumers to imagine that they have access to lower prices, while being prepared to trade off reduced prices for cramped in-store environments, in a strictly legal sense, a store that sells the majority of its merchandise directly to consumers is defined as a retailer rather than a wholesaler. Different jurisdictions set parameters for the ratio of consumer to business sales that define a retail business. A common way to distinguish wholesale from retail is by the main customer:

- Wholesale trade: mainly sells to organizations that will resell or use goods in operations (business-to-business).
- Retail trade: mainly sells to households/consumers.

== Retail practices and operations ==
=== Retail procurement ===
Obtaining goods in the required quantities and locating them where consumers will purchase them are core retail activities, so purchasing and supply management are essential features of a retail strategy.

The distinction between "strategic" and "managerial" decision-making is commonly used to distinguish "two phases having different goals and based on different conceptual tools. Strategic planning concerns the choice of policies aiming at improving the competitive position of the firm, taking account of challenges and opportunities proposed by the competitive environment. On the other hand, managerial decision-making is focused on the implementation of specific targets."

The strategic retail analysis typically includes the following elements:

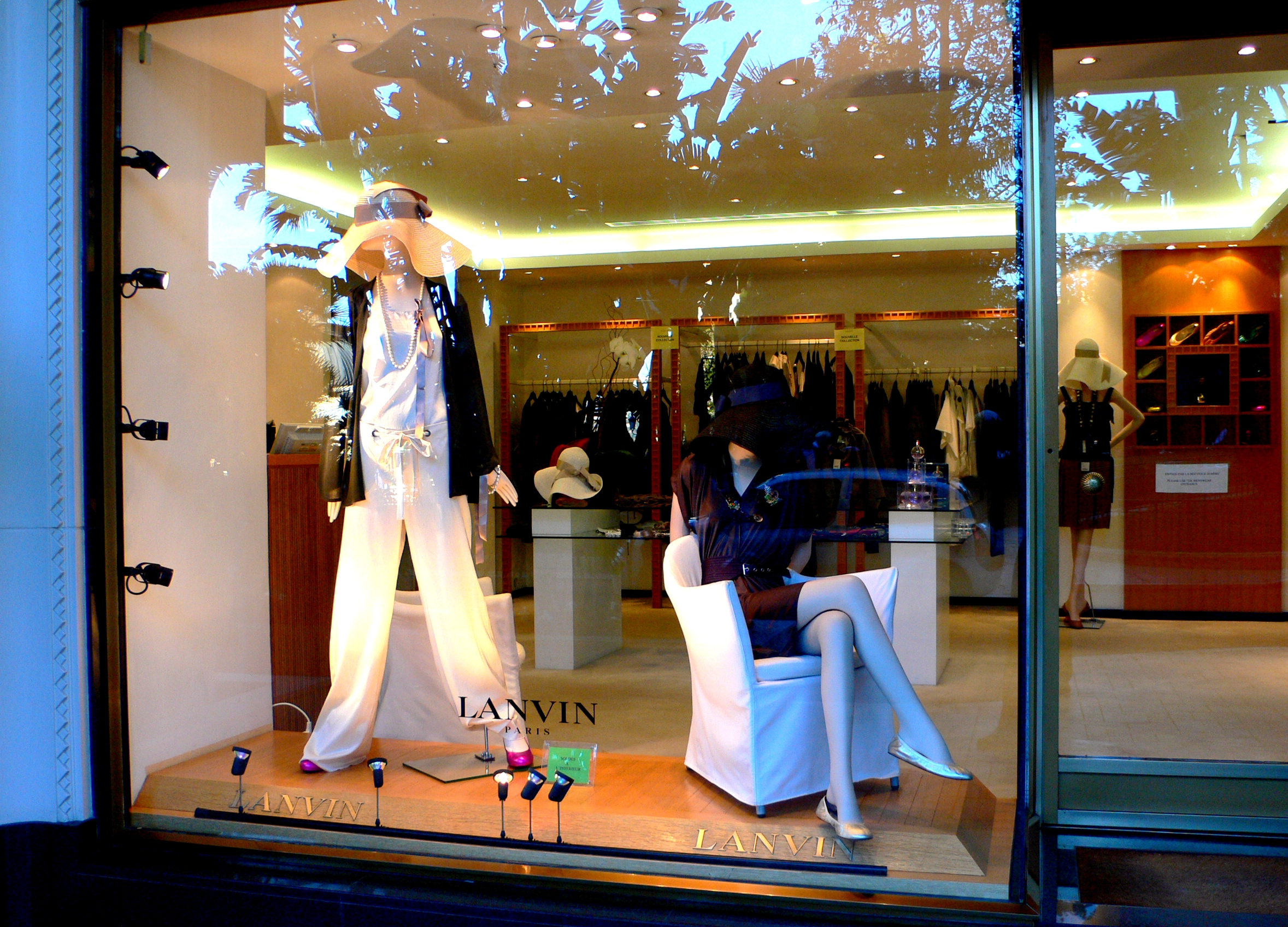
The retailer also considers the overall strategic position and retail image.

- Market analysis – Market size, stage of market, market competitiveness, market attractiveness, market trends
- Customer analysis – Market segmentation, demographic, geographic, and psychographic profile, values and attitudes, shopping habits, brand preferences, analysis of needs and wants, and media habits
- Internal analysis – Other capacities including human resource capability, technological capability, financial capability, ability to generate scale economies or economies of scope, trade relations, reputation, positioning, and past performance
- Competition analysis – Availability of substitutes, competitors' strengths and weaknesses, perceptual mapping, competitive trends
- Review of product mix –:: Sales per square foot, stock-turnover rates, profitability per product line
- Review of distribution channels – Lead-times between placing an order and delivery, cost of distribution, cost efficiency of intermediaries
- Evaluation of the economics of the strategy – Cost-benefit analysis of planned activities

At the conclusion of the retail analysis, retail marketers should have a clear idea of which groups of customers are to be the target of marketing activities. Not all elements are, however, equal, often with demographics, shopping motivations, and spending directing consumer activities. Retail research studies suggest that there is a strong relationship between a store's positioning and the socio-economic status of customers. In addition, the retail strategy, including service quality, has a significant and positive association with customer loyalty. A marketing strategy effectively outlines all key aspects of firms' targeted audience, demographics, and preferences. In a highly competitive market, the retail strategy sets up long-term sustainability. It focuses on customer relationships, stressing the importance of added value, customer satisfaction and highlights how the store's market positioning appeals to targeted groups of customers.

=== Retail marketing ===
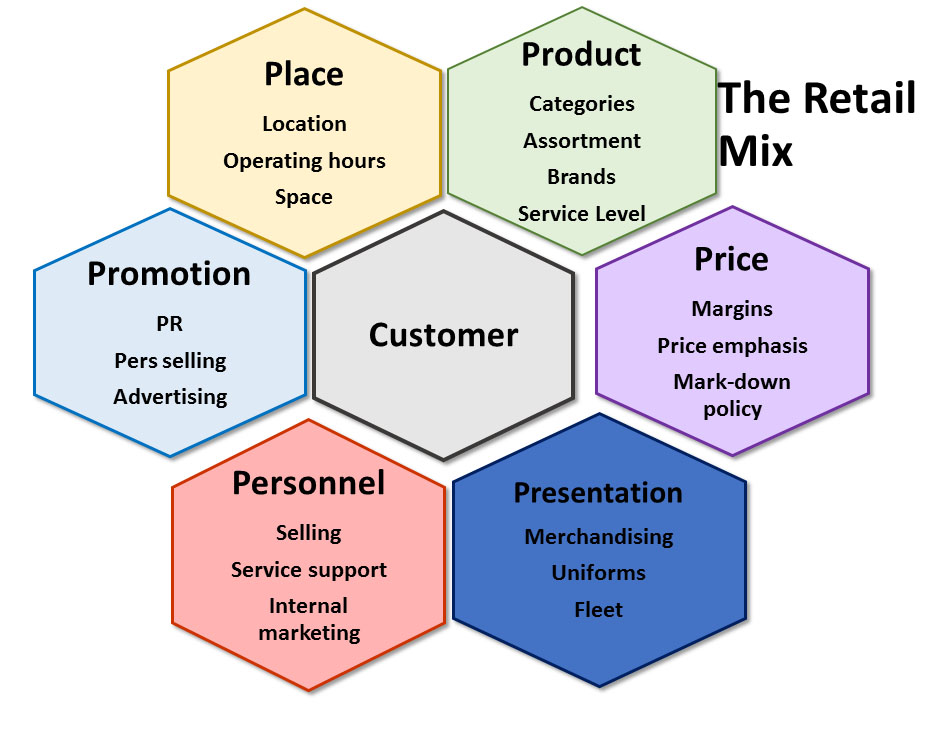
The retail marketing mix or the 6 Ps of retailing

A retail mix is devised for the purpose of coordinating day-to-day tactical decisions. The retail marketing mix typically consists of six broad decision layers, including product decisions, place decisions, promotion, price, personnel and presentation (also known as physical evidence). The retail mix is loosely based on the marketing mix, but has been expanded and modified in line with the unique needs of the retail context. Several scholars have argued for an expanded marketing mix with the inclusion of two new Ps, namely, Personnel and Presentation since these contribute to the customer's unique retail experience and are the principal basis for retail differentiation. Yet other scholars argue that the Retail Format (i.e. retail formula) should be included. The modified retail marketing mix that is most commonly cited in textbooks is often called the 4 (place, price, product, and promotion) or 6 Ps of retailing (see diagram at right).

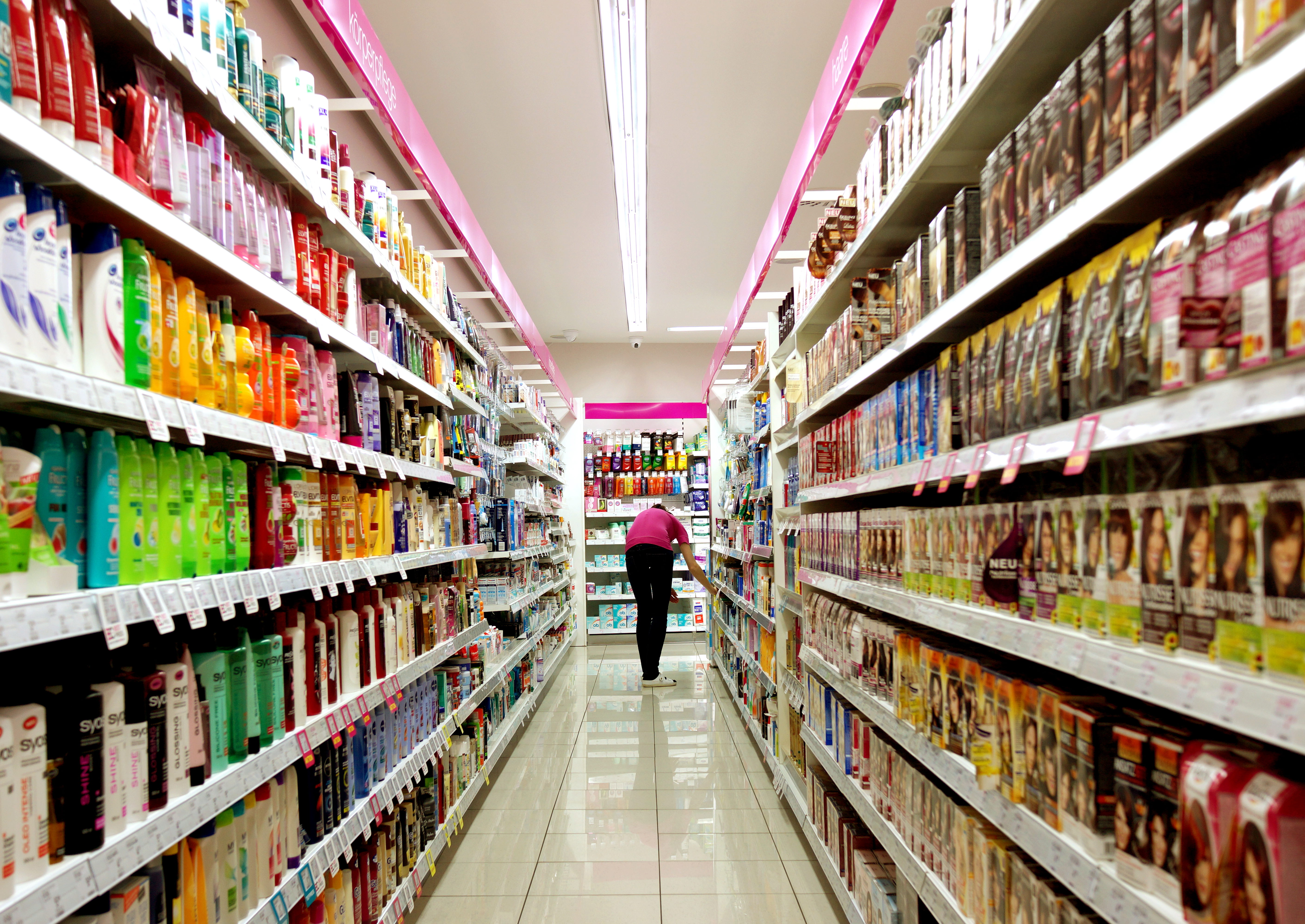
A typical supermarket carries an assortment of between 30,000 and 60,000 different products.

The primary product-related decisions facing the retailer are the product assortment (what product lines, how many lines and which brands to carry); the type of customer service (high contact through to self-service) and the availability of support services (e.g. credit terms, delivery services, after sales care). These decisions depend on careful analysis of the market, demand, competition, as well as the retailer's skills and expertise.

Customer service is the "sum of acts and elements that allow consumers to receive what they need or desire from [the] retail establishment." Retailers must decide whether to provide a full service outlet or a minimal service outlet, such as no service in the case of vending machines; self-service with only basic sales assistance or a full service operation as in many boutiques and speciality stores. In addition, the retailer needs to make decisions about sales support, such as customer delivery and after-sales customer care.

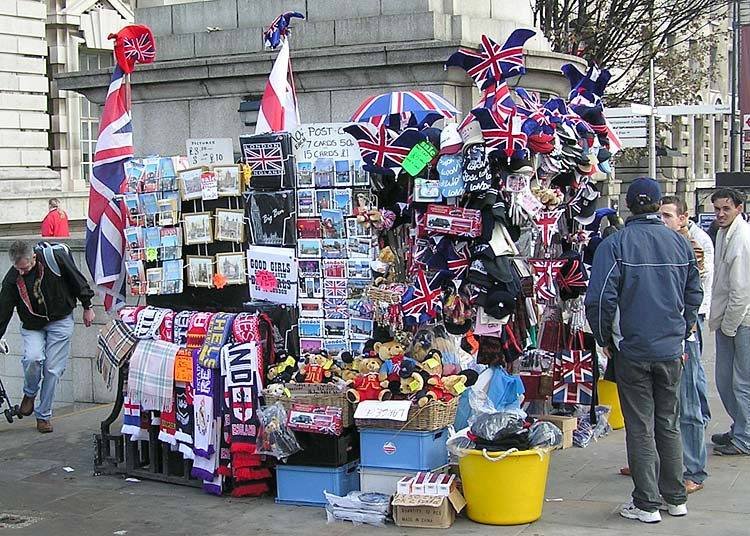
Sellers of souvenirs are typically located in high traffic areas such as this London souvenir stand situated near a railway station on a busy street corner.

Place decisions are primarily concerned with consumer access and may involve location, space utilisation and operating hours. Retailers may consider a range of both qualitative and quantitative factors to evaluate the potential sites under consideration. Macro factors include market characteristics (demographic, economic and socio-cultural), demand, competition and infrastructure (e.g. the availability of power, roads, public transport systems). Micro factors include the size of the site (e.g. availability of parking), access for delivery vehicles. A major retail trend has been the shift to multi-channel retailing. To counter the disruption caused by online retail, many brick-and-mortar retailers have entered the online retail space by setting up online catalogue sales and e-commerce websites. However, many retailers have noticed that consumers behave differently when shopping online. For instance, in terms of choice of online platform, shoppers tend to choose the online site of their preferred retailer initially, but as they gain more experience in online shopping, they become less loyal and more likely to switch to other retail sites. Online stores are usually available 24 hours a day, and many consumers across the globe have Internet access both at work and at home.

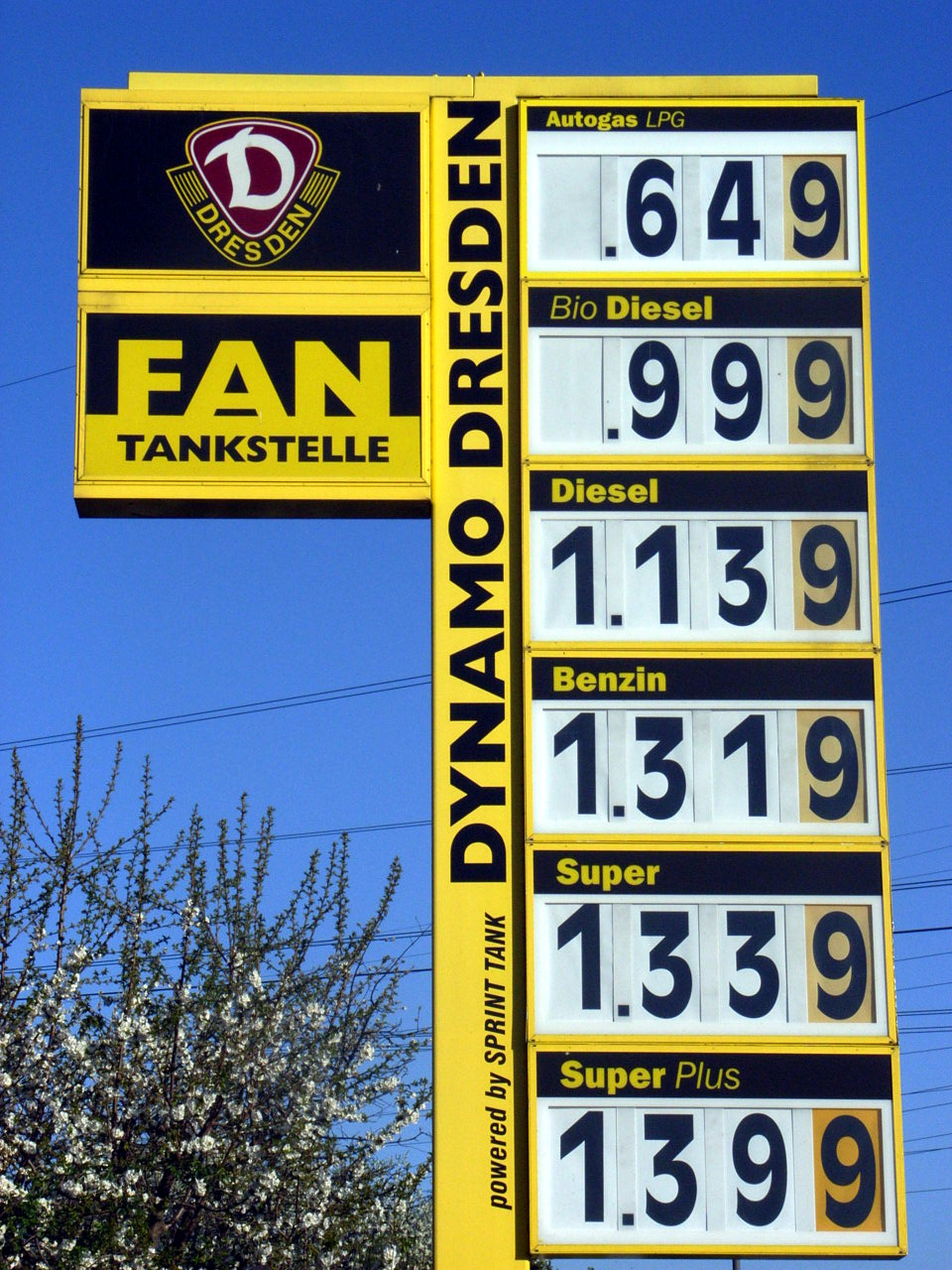
Extensive use of the terminal digit 'nine' suggests that psychological pricing is at play.

Transactional marketing aims to identify target consumers, then negotiate, trade, and ultimately end relationships to complete the transaction. In this one-time transaction process, both parties seek to maximize their own interests. As a result, transactional marketing leads to follow-up issues such as poor after-sales service quality and a lack of feedback channels for both parties. In addition, because retail enterprises need to redevelop client relationships for each transaction, marketing costs are high and customer retention is low. All these drawbacks of transactional marketing have gradually pushed the retail industry towards establishing long-term cooperative relationships with customers. From this perspective, enterprises began to shift their focus from transactions to relationships. While expanding the sales market and attracting new customers is very important for the retail industry, it is also important to establish and maintain long-term good relationships with previous customers, hence the name of the underlying concept, "relational marketing". Under this concept, retail enterprises value and attempt to improve relationships with customers, as customer relationships are conducive to maintaining stability in the current competitive retail market, and are also the future of retail enterprises.

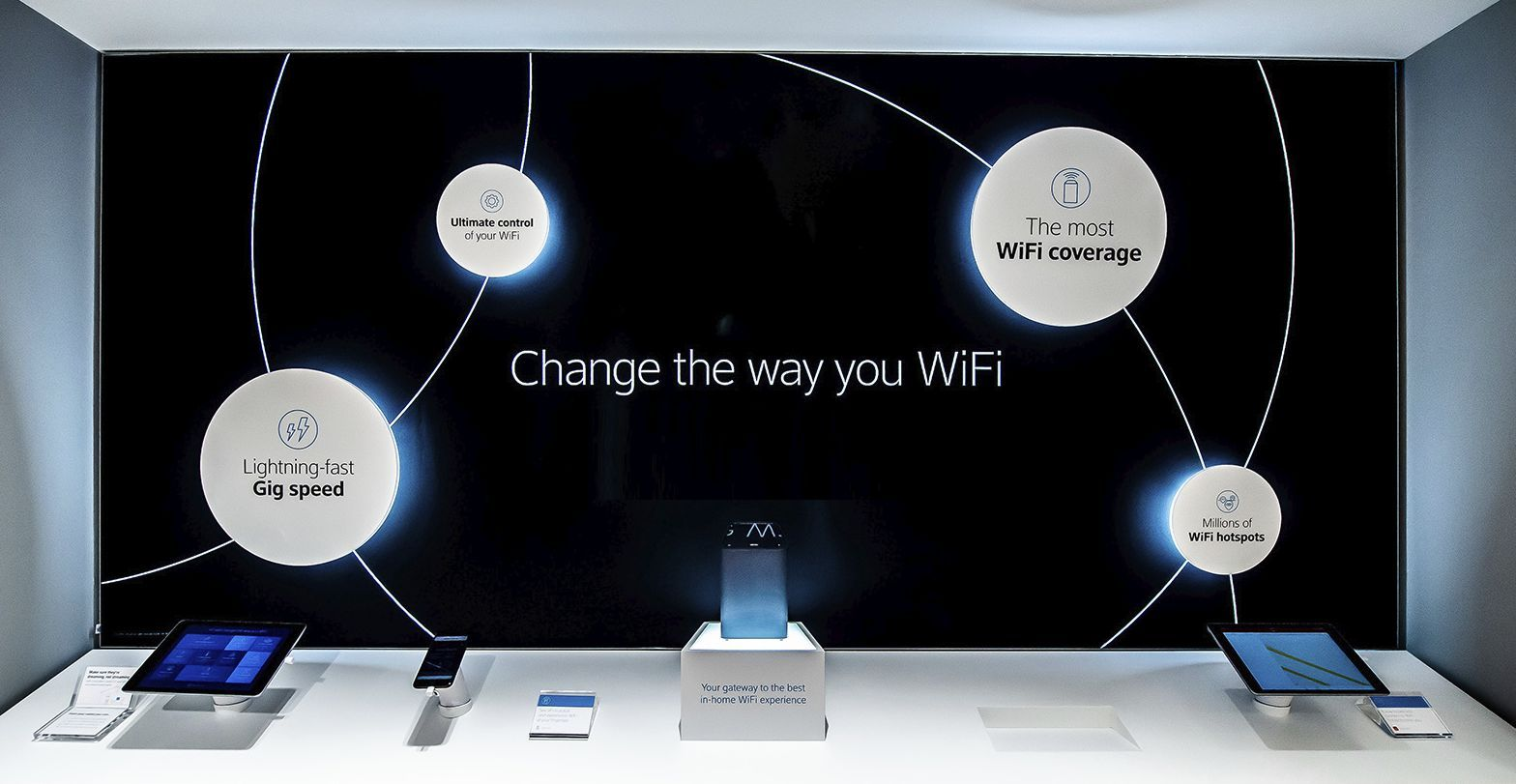
Modern technologies are often displayed in clean environments with much empty space.

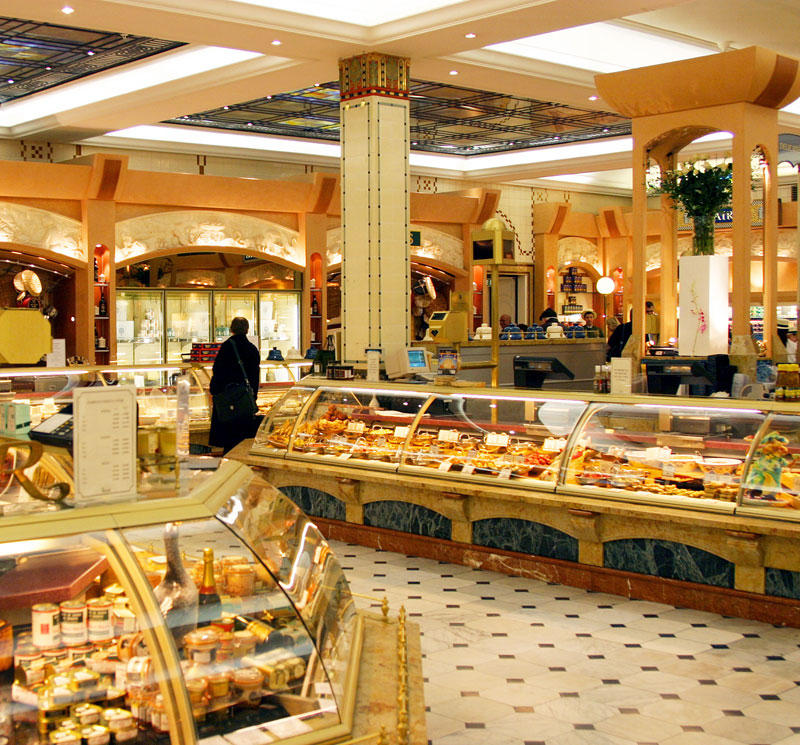
The retail servicescape includes the appearance, equipment, display space, retail counters, signage, layout and functionality of a retail outlet. Pictured: Harrods food court

Presentation refers to the physical evidence that signals the retail image. Physical evidence may include a diverse range of elements – the store itself, including premises, offices, exterior facade and interior layout, websites, delivery vans, warehouses, and staff uniforms. The environment in which the retail service encounter occurs is sometimes known as the retail servicescape. The store environment consists of many elements such as aromas, the physical environment (furnishings, layout, and functionality), ambient conditions (lighting, air temperature, and music) as well as signs, symbols, and artifacts (e.g. sales promotions, shelf space, sample stations, visual communications). Retail designers pay close attention to the front of the store, which is known as the decompression zone. In order to maximize the number of selling opportunities, retailers generally want customers to spend more time in a retail store. However, this must be balanced against customer expectations surrounding convenience, access and realistic waiting times. The way that brands are displayed is also part of the overall retail design. Where a product is placed on the shelves has implications for purchase likelihood as a result of visibility and access. Ambient conditions, such as lighting, temperature and music, are also part of the overall retail environment. It is common for a retail store to play music that relates to its target market.

==== Shopper profiles ====
Two different strands of research have investigated shopper behaviour. One is primarily concerned with shopper motivations, while the other seeks to segment shoppers according to common, shared characteristics. To some extent, these streams of research are interrelated, but each offers different types of insights into shopper behaviour.

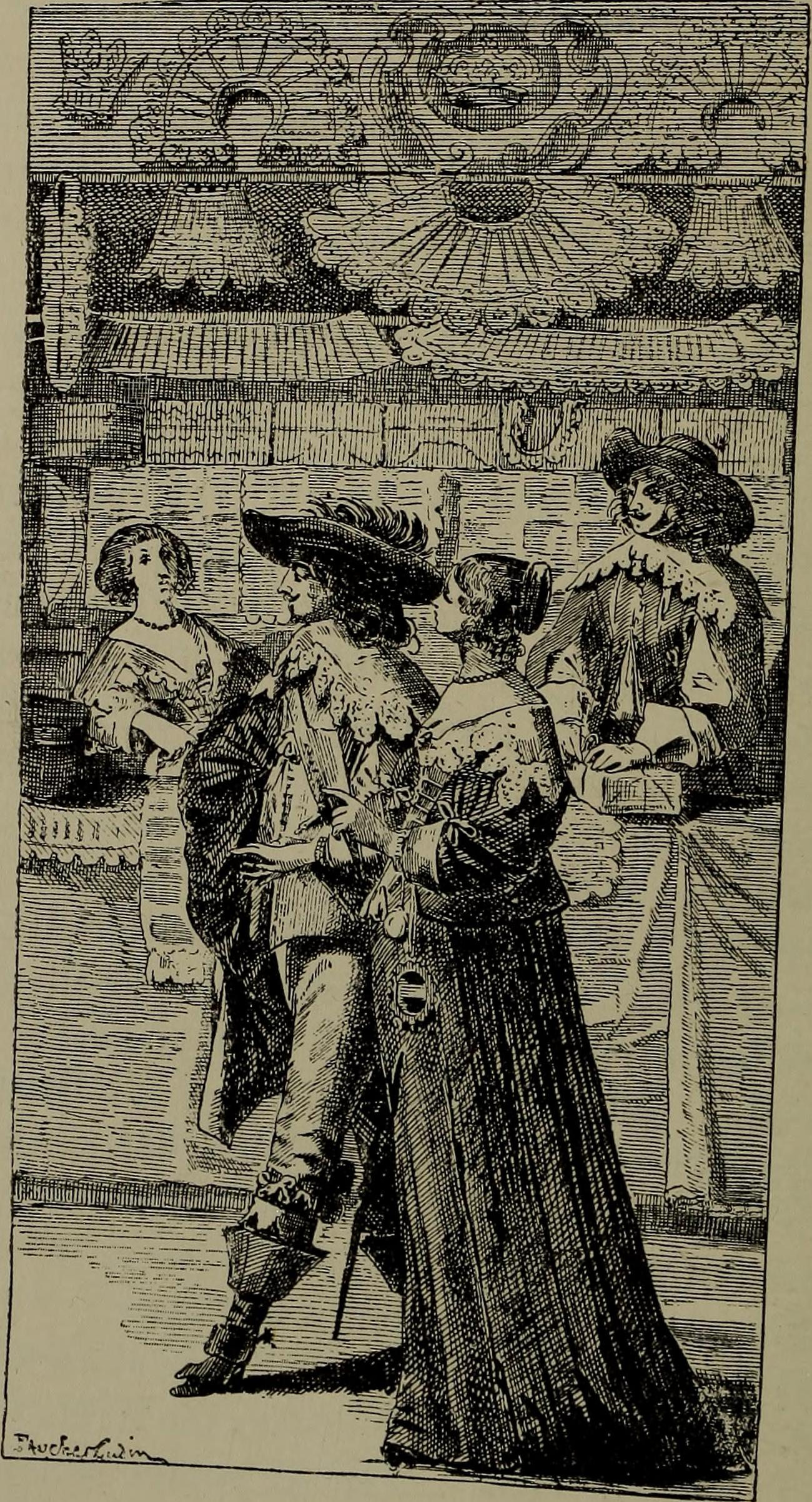
People who shop for pleasure are known as recreational shoppers. The recreational shopper has its origins in the grand European shopping arcades. Pictured: The gentry in a Dutch lace shop in the 17th Century

Babin et al. carried out some of the earliest investigations into shopper motivations and identified two broad motives: utilitarian and hedonic. Utilitarian motivations are task-related and rational. For the shopper with utilitarian motives, purchasing is a work-related task that is to be accomplished most efficiently and expediently. On the other hand, hedonic motives refer to pleasure. The shopper with hedonic motivations views shopping as a form of escapism where they are free to indulge in fantasy and freedom. Hedonic shoppers are more involved in the shopping experience.

Many different shopper profiles can be identified. Retailers develop customised segmentation analyses for each unique outlet. However, it is possible to identify a number of broad shopper profiles. One of the most well-known and widely cited shopper typologies is that developed by Sproles and Kendal in the mid-1980s. Sproles and Kendall's consumer typology is relatively consistent across time and across cultures. Their typology is based on the consumer's approach to making purchase decisions.

- Quality conscious/Perfectionist: Quality-consciousness is characterised by a consumer's search for the very best quality in products; quality-conscious consumers tend to shop systematically, making more comparisons and shopping around.
- Brand-conscious: Brand-consciousness is characterised by a tendency to buy expensive, well-known brands or designer labels. Those who score high on brand-consciousness tend to believe that the higher prices are an indicator of quality and exhibit a preference for department stores or top-tier retail outlets.
- Recreation-conscious/Hedonistic: Recreational shopping is characterised by the consumer's engagement in the purchase process. Those who score high on recreation-consciousness regard shopping itself as a form of enjoyment.
- Price-conscious: A consumer who exhibits price-and-value consciousness. Price-conscious shoppers carefully shop around seeking lower prices, sales or discounts and are motivated by obtaining the best value for money.
- Novelty/fashion-conscious: characterised by a consumer's tendency to seek out new products or new experiences for the sake of excitement; who gain excitement from seeking new things; they like to keep up-to-date with fashions and trends, variety-seeking is associated with this dimension.
- Impulsive: Impulsive consumers are somewhat careless in making purchase decisions, buy on the spur of the moment and are not overly concerned with expenditure levels or obtaining value. Those who score high on impulsive dimensions tend not to be engaged with the object at either a cognitive or emotional level.
- Confused (by overchoice): characterised by a consumer's confusion caused by too many product choices, too many stores or an overload of product information; tend to experience information overload.
- Habitual/brand loyal: characterised by a consumer's tendency to follow a routine purchase pattern on each purchase occasion; consumers have favourite brands or stores and have formed habits in choosing; the purchase decision does not involve much evaluation or shopping around.

Some researchers have adapted Sproles and Kendall's methodology for use in specific countries or cultural groups. Consumer decision styles are important for retailers and marketers because they describe behaviours that are relatively stable over time, and for this reason, they are useful for market segmentation.

=== Pricing ===
The broad pricing strategy is normally established in the company's overall strategic plan. In the case of chain stores, the pricing strategy would be set by the head office. Broadly, there are six approaches to pricing strategy mentioned in the marketing literature: operations-oriented, revenue-oriented, customer-oriented, value-based, relationship-oriented, and socially-oriented. When decision-makers have determined the broad approach to pricing (i.e., the pricing strategy), they turn their attention to pricing tactics. Tactical pricing decisions are shorter-term prices, designed to accomplish specific short-term goals. Pricing tactics that are commonly used in retail include discount pricing, everyday low prices, high-low pricing, loss leaders, product bundling, promotional pricing, and psychological pricing. Two strategies to entice the buyer, money back guarantee and buy one get one free, were devised by 18th-century retail entrepreneur Josiah Wedgwood. Retailers must also plan for customer preferred payment modes – e.g. cash, credit, lay-by, Electronic Funds Transfer at Point-of-Sale (EFTPOS). All payment options require some type of handling and attract costs. Contrary to common misconception, price is not the most important factor for consumers when deciding to buy a product.

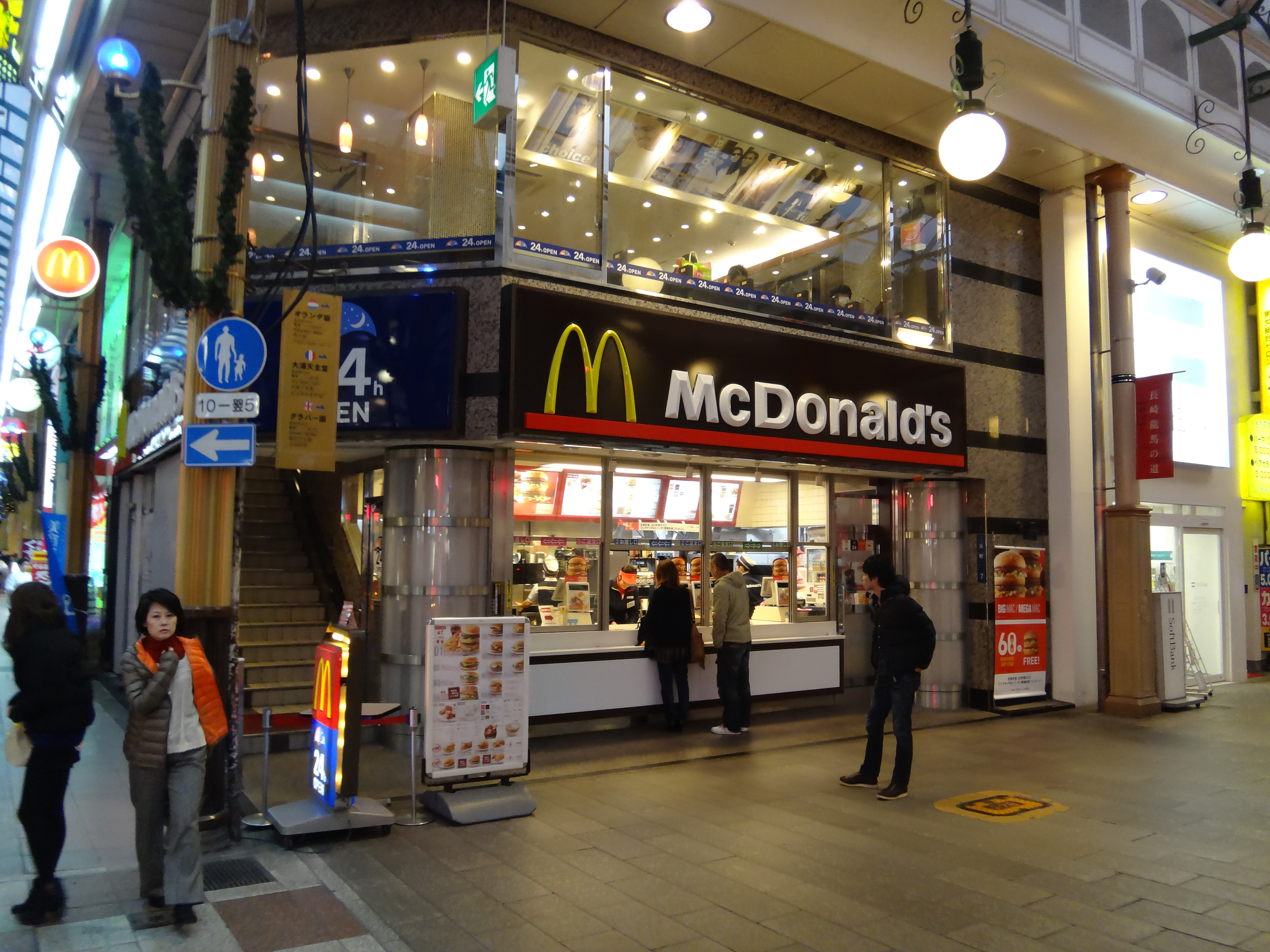
One of the most well-known cross-selling sales scripts comes from McDonald's. "Would you like fries with that?"

Retailers can employ different techniques to enhance sales volume and to improve the customer experience, such as Add-on, Upsell or Cross-sell; Selling on value; and knowing when to close the sale.

Cost for the real-estate and theft tend to increase retail prices, while zoning can reduce competition.

== Types of retail formats ==
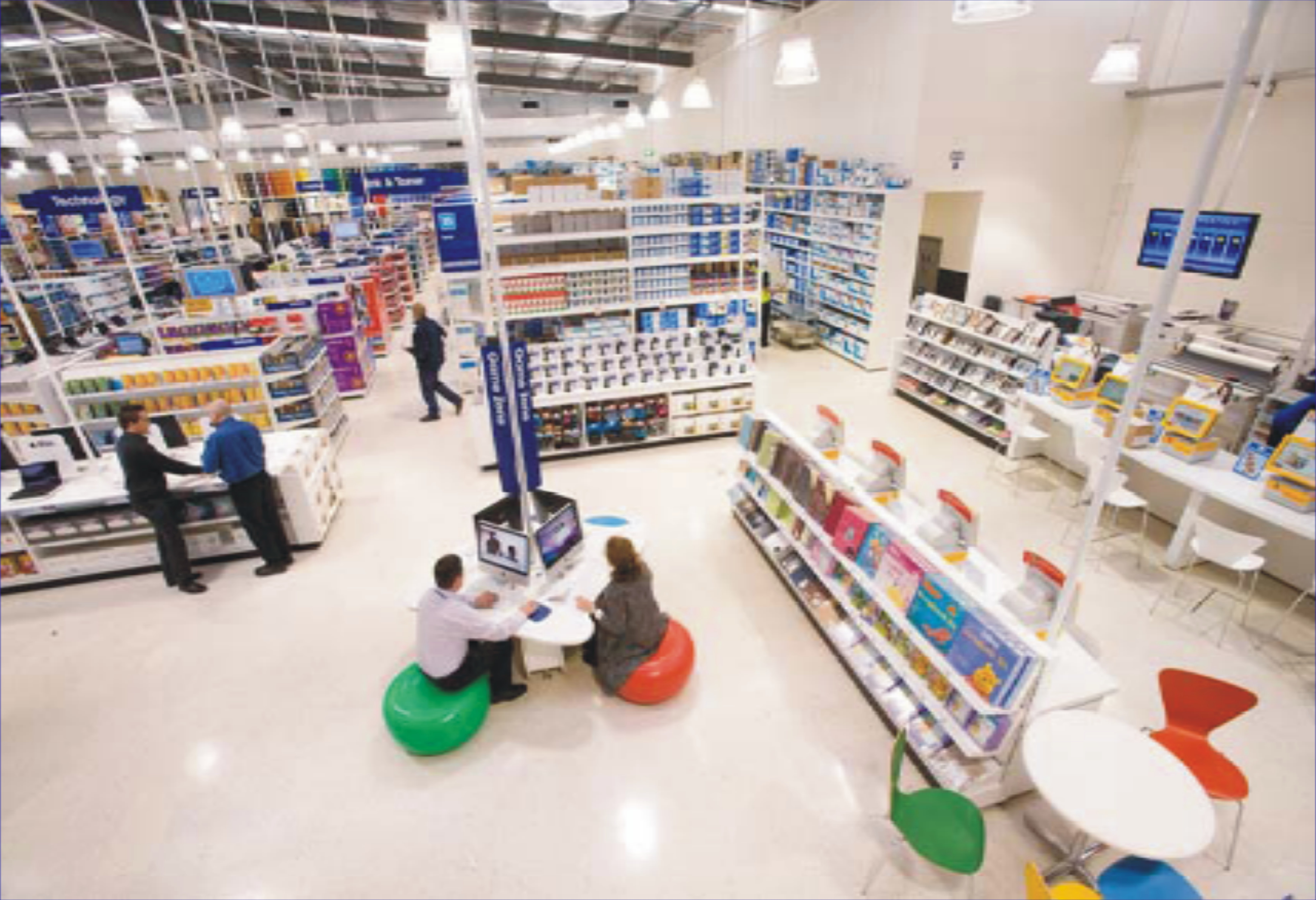
Australia's Officeworks retails everything for the home office or small commercial office; stationery, furniture, electronics, communications devices, copying, printing and photography services, coffee, tea and light snacks.

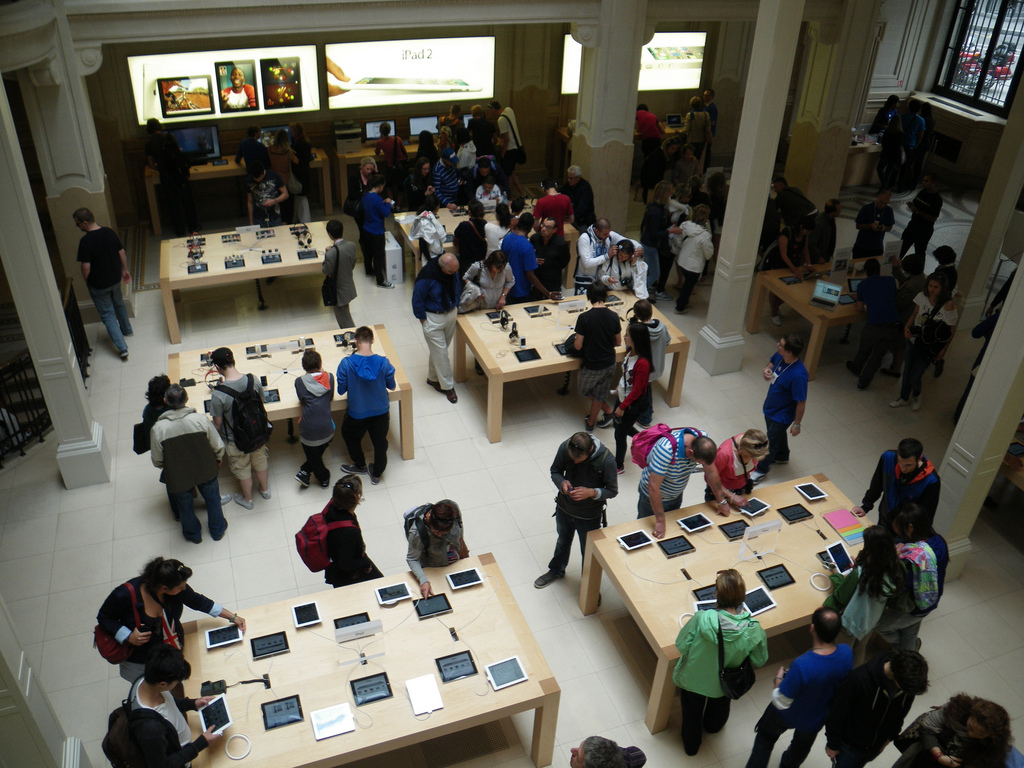
Apple's concept stores include video walls, Wi-Fi and desks to provide an immersive customer experience.

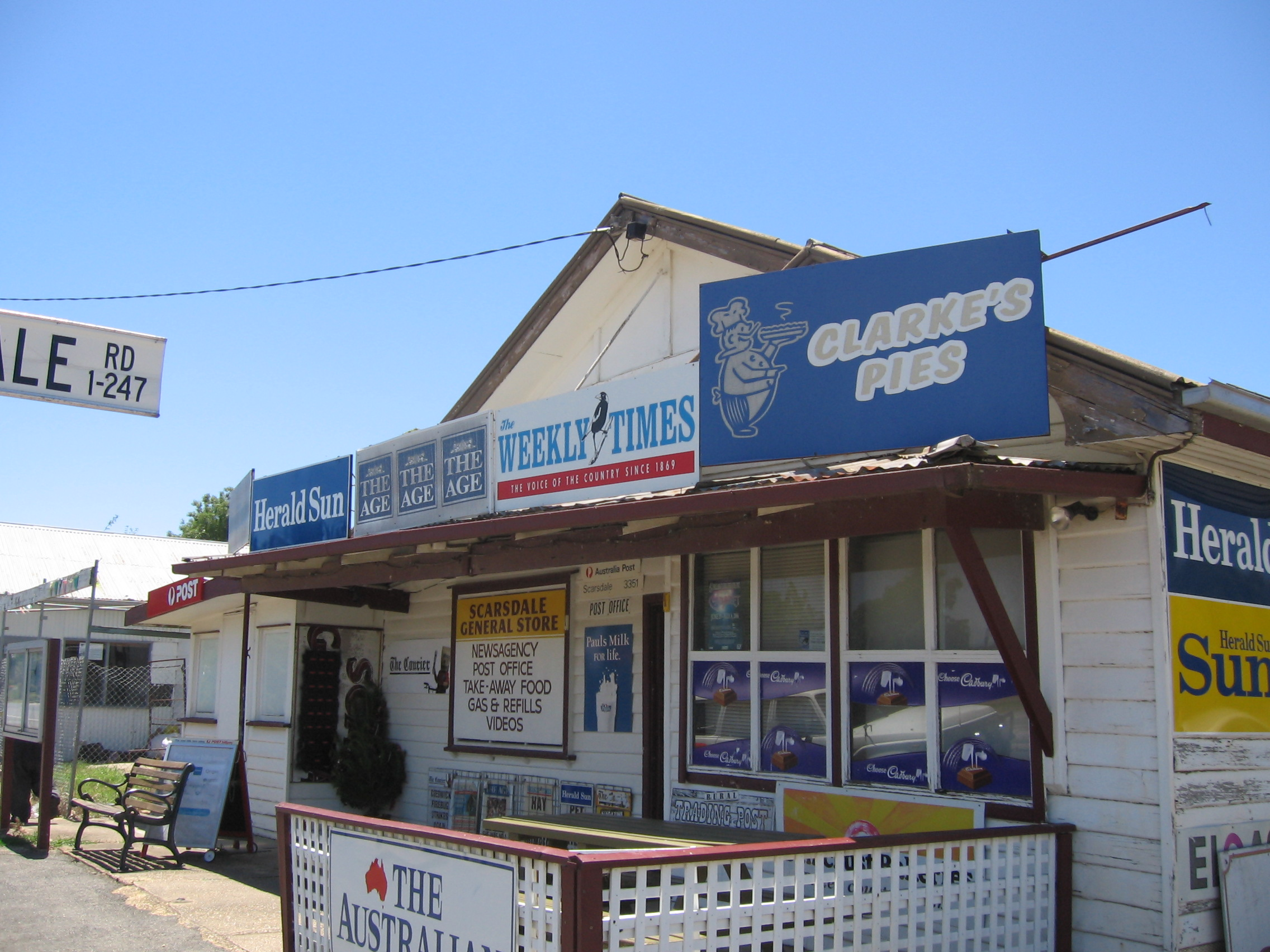
A general store in Scarsdale, Victoria, Australia operates as a post-office, newsagent, petrol station, video hire, grocer and take-away food retailer. This type of store is referred to locally as a milk bar.

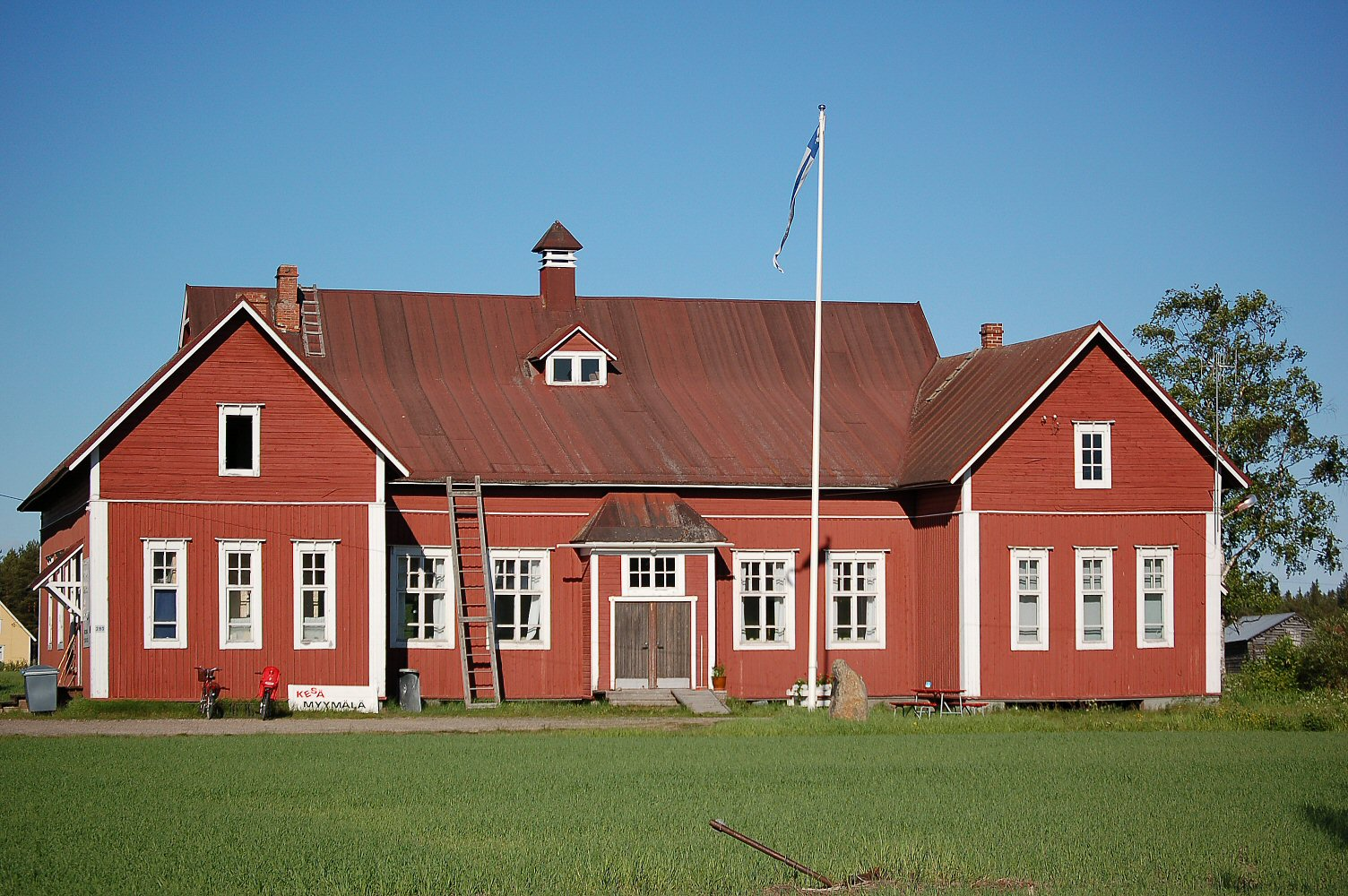
A local store named "Luovon puoji" in the Hailuoto Island, Finland

Retail formats (also known as retail formulas) influence the consumer's store choice and address the consumer's expectations. At its most basic level, a retail format is a simple marketplace, that is; a location where goods and services are exchanged. In some parts of the world, the retail sector is still dominated by small family-run stores, but large retail chains are increasingly dominating the sector, because they can exert considerable buying power and pass on the savings in the form of lower prices. Many of these large retail chains also produce their own private labels, which compete alongside manufacturer brands. Considerable consolidation of retail stores has changed the retail landscape, transferring power away from wholesalers and into the hands of the large retail chains. In Britain and Europe, the retail sale of goods is designated as a service activity. The European Service Directive applies to all retail trade, including periodic markets, street traders and peddlers.

Retail stores may be classified by the type of product carried. Softline retailers sell goods that are consumed after a single-use, or have a limited life (typically under three years), as they are normally consumed. Soft goods include clothing, other fabrics, footwear, toiletries, cosmetics, medicines and stationery. Grocery stores, including supermarkets and hypermarkets, along with convenience stores carry a mix of food products and consumable household items such as detergents, cleansers, personal hygiene products. Retailers selling consumer durables are sometimes known as hardline retailers – automobiles, appliances, electronics, furniture, sporting goods, lumber, etc., and parts for them. Specialist retailers operate in many industries such as the arts, e.g. green grocers, contemporary art galleries, bookstores, handicrafts, musical instruments, gift shops.

A special retail format is home shopping. There are three main types of it: mail or telephone ordering from catalogs; telephone ordering in response to advertisements in print and electronic media (such as periodicals, TV shopping channels and radio); and online shopping.

== Impact of technology ==
When discussing the impact of technology on shopping and retail, e-commerce is often the first thing that comes to mind for retailers. However, technologies such as big data, artificial intelligence, computer vision, and the Internet of Things use data to transform every part of the shopping experience, from browsing to checkout.

It is important for organizations to embrace digital disruption in order to gain a competitive advantage. When an industry experiences digital disruption, it typically signals that consumer needs are shifting. Retailers enhance their analytics process and make better-informed decisions thanks to big data, artificial intelligence, computer vision, and the Internet of Things. The use of data by retailers is mostly evident in the following aspects, based on the above-mentioned new technologies:

- Enhance marketing by Personalizing customer experience
- Optimize supply chain management
- Adjust prices to maximize profits

Many leading brands actively target tourists who travel specifically to shop or allocate a significant portion of their spending to retail while on vacation. According to the Global Retail Tourism Market Report 2019–2023, the global shopping tourism market was valued at approximately $1.2 trillion in 2018. The report projected steady growth, with a compound annual growth rate (CAGR) of 6.7% between 2019 and 2023. Building on this trend, Kogan Page published the book Leading Travel and Tourism Retail in 2023, offering an in-depth analysis of the travel retail sector and its evolution in the post-COVID era.

== Retail industry ==
=== History ===
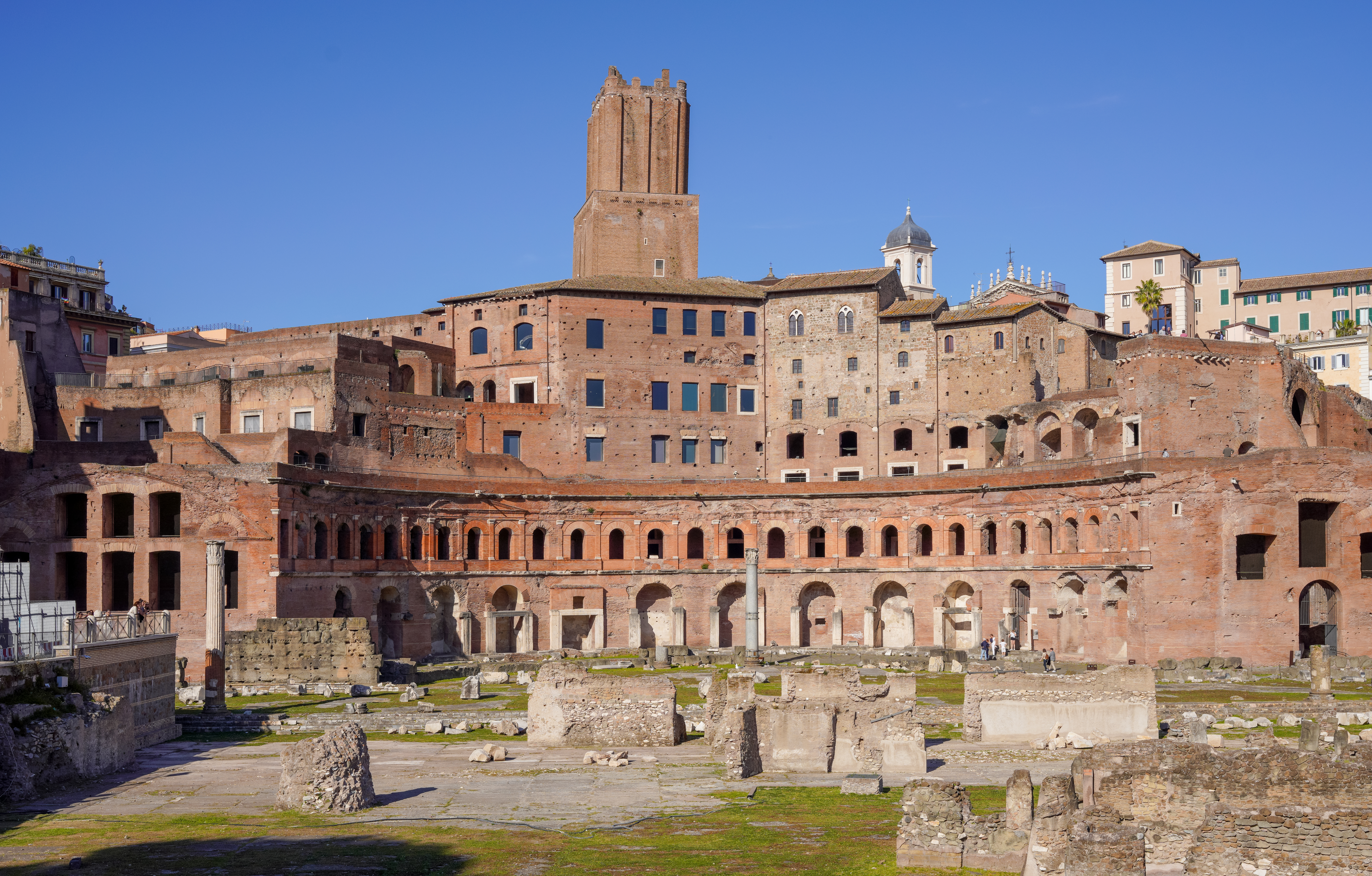
Marketplace at Trajan's Forum, the earliest known example of permanent retail shopfronts

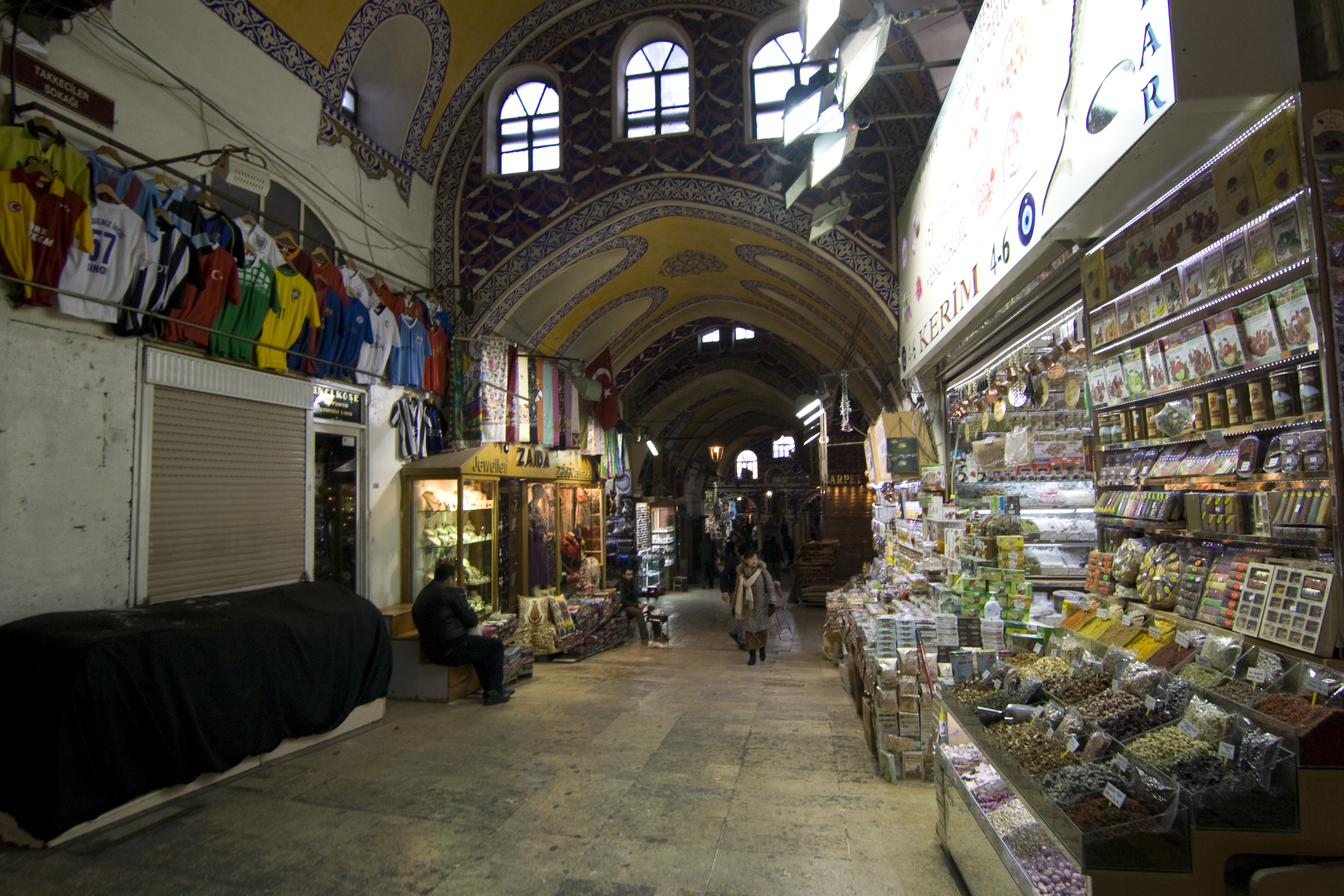
Grand Bazaar, Istanbul (interior). Established in 1455, it is thought to be the oldest continuously operating covered market.

Retail markets have existed since ancient times. Archaeological evidence for trade, probably involving barter systems, dates back more than 10,000 years. As civilizations grew, barter was replaced with retail trade involving coinage. Selling and buying are thought to have emerged in Asia Minor (modern Turkey) around the 7th-millennium BCE. In ancient Greece, markets operated within the agora, an open space where, on market days, goods were displayed on mats or temporary stalls. In ancient Rome, trade took place in the forum. The Roman forum was arguably the earliest example of a permanent retail shop-front.

Research from July 2008 suggests that China exhibited a rich history of early retail systems. From as early as 200 BCE, Chinese packaging and branding were used to signal family, place names and product quality, and the use of government imposed product branding was used between 600 and 900 CE. Eckhart and Bengtsson have argued that during the Song dynasty (960–1127), Chinese society developed a consumerist culture, where a high level of consumption was attainable for a wide variety of ordinary consumers rather than just the elite.

In Medieval England and Europe, relatively few permanent shops were to be found; instead, customers walked into the tradesman's workshops where they discussed purchasing options directly with tradesmen. In the more populous cities, a small number of shops were beginning to emerge by the 13th century. Outside the major cities, most consumable purchases were made through markets or fairs. Market-places appear to have emerged independently outside Europe. The Grand Bazaar in Istanbul is often cited as the world's oldest continuously operating market; its construction began in 1455. The Spanish conquistadors wrote glowingly of markets in the Americas. In the 15th century, the Mexica (Aztec) market of Tlatelolco was the largest in all the Americas.

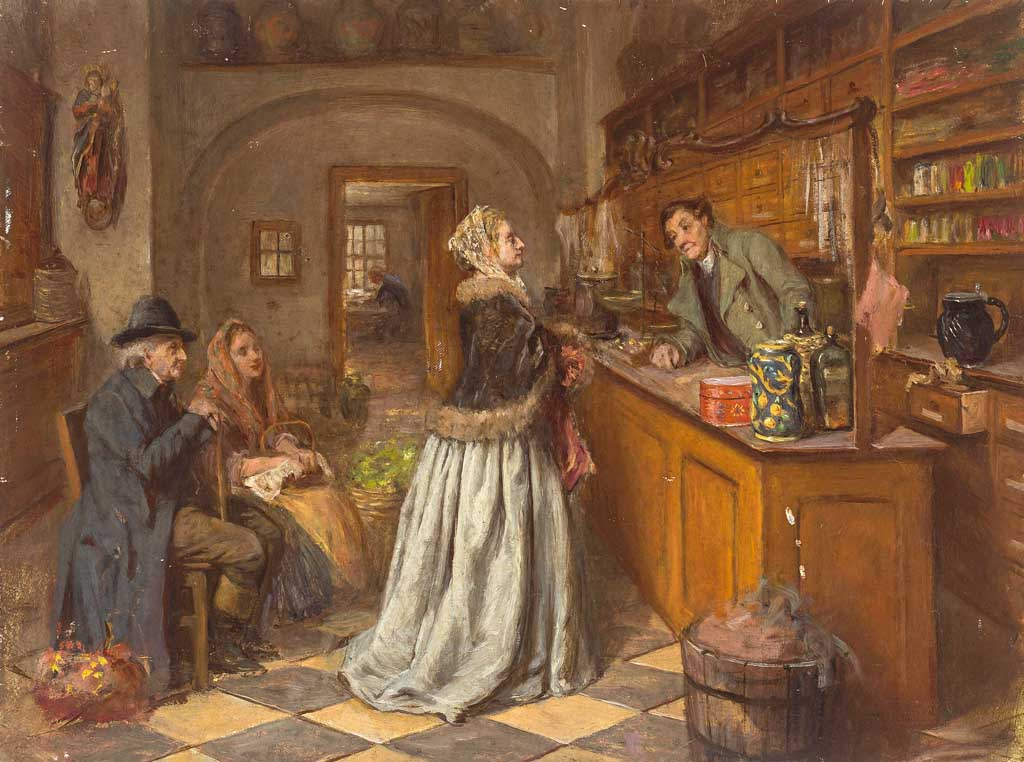
The retail service counter was an innovation of the 18th century.

By the 17th century, permanent shops with more regular trading hours were beginning to supplant markets and fairs as the main retail outlet. Provincial shopkeepers were active in almost every English market town. As the number of shops grew, they transformed. The trappings of a modern shop, which had been absent from the 16th- and early 17th-century store, gradually made way for store interiors and shopfronts that are more familiar to modern shoppers. Before the 18th century, the typical retail store had no counter, display cases, chairs, mirrors, changing rooms, etc. However, the opportunity for the customer to browse merchandise, touch and feel products began to be available, with retail innovations from the late 17th and early 18th centuries.

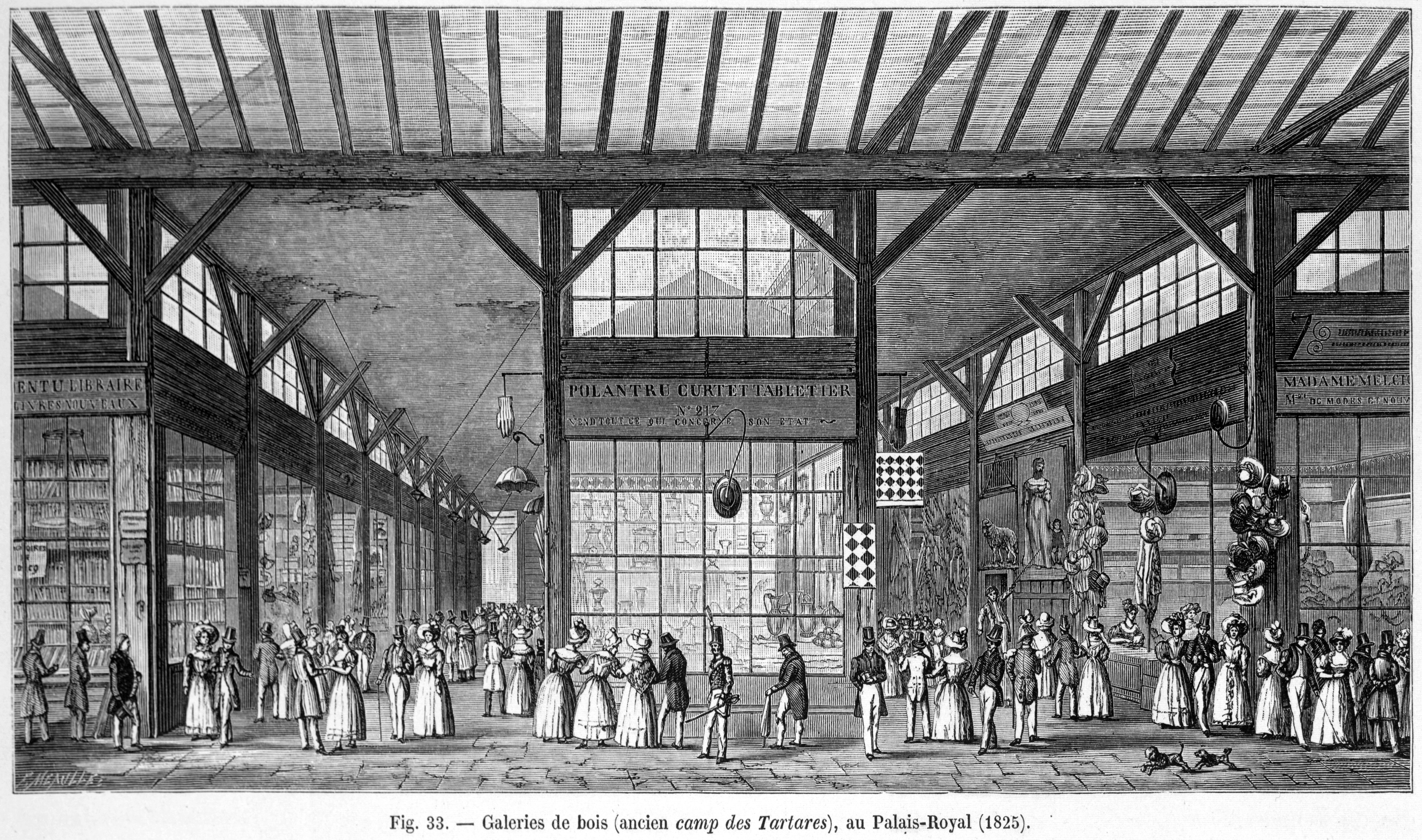
Galeries de bois at au Palais-Royal, one of the earliest shopping arcades in Europe

By the late 18th century, grand shopping arcades began to emerge across Europe and in the Antipodes. A shopping arcade refers to a multiple-vendor space, operating under a covered roof. Typically, the roof was constructed of glass to allow for natural light and to reduce the need for candles or electric lighting. Some of the earliest examples of shopping arcades appeared in Paris due to its lack of pavement for pedestrians. While the arcades were the province of the bourgeoisie, a new type of retail venture emerged to serve the needs of the working poor. John Stuart Mill wrote about the rise of the co-operative retail store, which he witnessed first-hand in the mid-19th century.

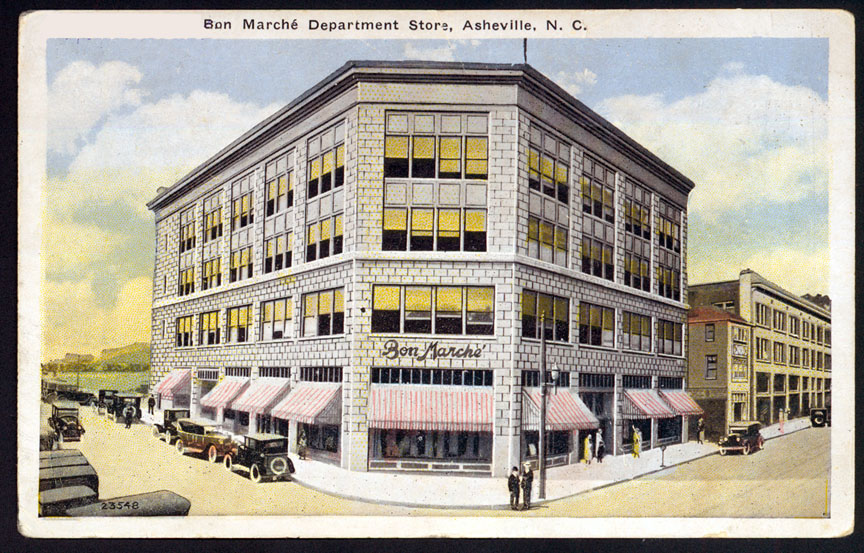
Department stores, such as Le Bon Marché of France, appeared from the mid-19th century.

The modern era of retailing is defined as the period from the Industrial Revolution to the 21st century. In major cities, the department store emerged in the mid- to late 19th century, and permanently reshaped shopping habits, and redefined concepts of service and luxury. Many of the early department stores were more than just a retail emporium; rather they were venues where shoppers could spend their leisure time and be entertained. Retail, using mail order, came of age during the mid-19th century. Although catalogue sales had been used since the 15th century, this method of retailing was confined to a few industries, such as the sale of books and seeds. However, improvements in transport and postal services led several entrepreneurs on either side of the Atlantic to experiment with catalogue sales.

In the post-war period, an American architect, Victor Gruen developed a concept for a shopping mall; a planned, self-contained shopping complex complete with an indoor plaza, statues, planting schemes, piped music, and car-parking. Gruen's vision was to create a shopping atmosphere where people felt so comfortable that they would spend more time in the environment, thereby enhancing opportunities for purchasing. The first of these malls opened at Northland Mall near Detroit in 1954. Throughout the twentieth century, a trend towards larger store footprints became discernible. The average size of a U.S. supermarket grew from 31,000 square feet (2,900 m^{2}) square feet in 1991 to 44,000 square feet (4,100 m^{2}) square feet in 2000. By the end of the twentieth century, stores were using labels such as "mega-stores" and "warehouse" stores to reflect their growing size. The upward trend of increasing retail space was not consistent across nations and led in the early 21st century to the United States having nearly a 2-fold difference in square footage per capita compared to Europe.

As the 21st century takes shape, some indications suggest that large retail stores have come under increasing pressure from online sales models and that reductions in store size are evident. Under such competition and other issues such as business debt, there has been a noted business disruption called the retail apocalypse in recent years which several retail businesses, especially in North America, are sharply reducing their number of stores, or going out of business entirely.

=== Global top ten retailers ===
As of 2016, China was the largest retail market in the world.

Worldwide top ten retailers
Rank	Company	Headquarters	2024 total revenue (US$ billion)	Business foundation	Total worldwide store count
1	Walmart	United States	$676	Hypermarket/supercenter/superstore	10,692
2	Amazon	United States	$393	Ecommerce	605
3	Schwarz Gruppe (Lidl)	Germany	$182	Discount grocery store	14,244
4	Aldi	Germany	$155	Discount grocery store	13,877
5	Costco	United States	$246	Cash & carry/warehouse club	890
6	Ahold Delhaize	Netherlands	$99	Grocery store	8,111
7	Carrefour	France	$98	Hypermarket/supermarket	14,961
8	Seven & I	Japan	$90	Convenience store	41,128
9	IKEA	Sweden	$51	Furniture	489
10	Home Depot	United States	$155	Hardware store	2,347

U.S. Monthly Retail Sales, 1992–2010

== See also ==
- Automated retail
- Direct-to-consumer
- Business-to-business
- B2G
- Consumer behaviour
- Convenience store
- Department store
- Dollar store
- Dry goods store
- Final goods
- Five and dime
- General store
- Grey pound
- Hanseatic League
- High Street
- History of marketing
- Hyper market
- Like for like
- List of department stores by country
- Point of sales
- Sales promotion
- Retail concentration
- Retail design
- Retail software
- Retailtainment
- Revenge buying
- Sales density
- Shopping
- Store manager
- Super market
- Super store
- Variety store
- Visual merchandising
- Licensed victualler
- Wardrobing
- Window shopping
- Large-scale retail in France
