= Women in Product =

American nonprofit organization

Women In Product
- Founded: September 2016; 10 years ago
- Type: 501(c)(3)
- Purpose: Building a strong community of women builders and leaders in the tech industry
- Location: Palo Alto, California, U.S.
- Region served: Global
- Key people: Elizabeth Ames (CEO); Deb Liu (President); Ha Nguyen (Vice President); Avni Shah (Board Member); Fidji Simo (Board Member)
- Website: womenpm.org

Women In Product is a 501(c)(3) nonprofit organization "Equip women to thrive in product management careers at all levels." As of 2020, they have communities in 21 regions, including San Francisco Bay Area, Boston, New York City, Austin, Vancouver, and Singapore. They've hosted an annual conference since 2016, the first of which was co-founded by Facebook executives Deb Liu and Fidji Simo, with Sheryl Sandberg as the keynote speaker. In 2020, the organization hosted their fifth annual conference as a virtual event.
