= Deb Liu =

American technology executive

Deborah Liu
- Born: United States
- Education: Duke University (BSE); Stanford Graduate School of Business
- Occupation: Technology executive
- Known for: Former CEO of Ancestry.com; Founder of Ember AI
- Board member of: Intuit

Deb Liu in 2016

Deborah Liu is an American technology executive and the former CEO of genealogy company, Ancestry from 2021 to January 2025 Liu served on the board of Intuit and co-founded the nonprofit organisation Women in Product. She is the founder of the artificial intelligence startup Ember AI.

== Early life and education ==
Liu is of Chinese descent and her parents emigrated to the U.S. in the 1960s. She was raised in a small town in South Carolina. She is a graduate of Duke University (B.S.E in Civil Engineering) and Stanford Business School.

== Career ==
Liu was director of product for the end-to-end buyer experience at eBay and spearheaded the integration between eBay and PayPal. She was director of product marketing management and product management at PayPal.

In 2009, she joined Facebook, where she worked on Facebook Credits and Facebook Platform and helped build their mobile app install ad business. In 2016, as VP of product development, she relaunched Facebook Marketplace and became VP of marketplace in 2017.

After being at Facebook for 11 years, Liu joined Ancestry.com as its CEO March 1, 2021.

She was included on Business Insider's list of "The Most Powerful Female Engineers" and PaymentsSource's list of "The Most Influential Women in Payments", and is a member of the Committee of 100.

In August 2022, she published her first book "Take Back Your Power: 10 New Rules for Women at Work". Liu is a seed investor and advisor to startups.

She stepped down as CEO of Ancestry in January 2025 following a diagnosis of breast cancer and to spend more time with her family.

Following her departure from Ancestry, Liu founded the artificial intelligence startup Ember AI. She has also spoken publicly about the role of artificial intelligence in the workplace, highlighting disparities in AI adoption between men and women.
