= Avni Shah =

Avni Shah is an American computer scientist and business executive. She is vice president of Google for Education. Shah joined Google in 2003 and worked on Google Toolbar and Google Search. She kicked off Google's first search personalization efforts. In 2009, Shah move to Google's Zürich office and led Google Maps & Local efforts for Europe, the Middle East, and Africa. In 2011, she moved back to the US and became VP of product management for Google Chrome. In 2017, she moved to her current role leading Google for Education.

Shah was one of two women to take the stage during the 2014 Google I/O keynote, and has participated in conferences and organizations that support women in technology. She serves on the board of Women in Product.

Shah graduated from MIT with a degree in Computer Science & Electrical Engineering.
