= Apoorva Mehta =

Canadian-American billionaire

- Born: 1986 (age 39–40); Jodhpur, India
- Education: University of Waterloo
- Occupations: CEO and co-founder, Cloud Health Systems
- Known for: Founder of Instacart

Apoorva Mehta (born 1986) is a billionaire Canadian-American businessman and the founder of Instacart and Cloud Health Systems. As of September 2023 he had a net worth of $1.3 billion, owing to his 10% ownership share of Instacart and his stake in Cloud Health Systems.

== Biography ==
=== Early life and education ===
Mehta was born in 1986 in Jodhpur, India. He moved to Libya shortly after he was born, where his father worked for electric transmission line company. In 2000, when he was 14, he and his family moved to Hamilton, Ontario, Canada. He graduated from the University of Waterloo with an electrical engineering degree.

=== Early career ===
Mehta worked for four months as a design engineer at Blackberry and Qualcomm before joining Amazon in 2008 as a supply-chain engineer. In 2010, Mehta left Amazon and moved to San Francisco to become an entrepreneur. Between 2010 and 2012, he launched 20 startups, almost all of which failed. Failed businesses included an advertising startup for gaming companies and a social network for lawyers.

=== Instacart ===
After getting inspiration from being low on groceries without owning a car as well as his trips to the grocery store by bus in the cold while growing up in Canada, Mehta founded Instacart in 2012 at age 26. He tried to apply for funding through Y Combinator but missed the deadline. He eventually got a meeting by using the Instacart mobile app to deliver a six-pack of beer from 21st Amendment Brewery to a Y Combinator partner and was admitted to the summer of 2012 batch. Y Combinator helped Mehta raise $2.3 million in funding and enabled him to meet his two co-founders, Max Mullen and Brandon Leonardo.

In July 2021, Mehta resigned as CEO and became the executive chairman. He left the company entirely in September 2023.

=== Cloud Health Systems ===
In 2022, Mehta founded Cloud Health Systems, a medical consulting venture. The company raised $30 million in seed funding, led by venture capital firm Thrive Capital, and was valued at $200 million.

== Awards and recognition ==
Mehta was included on Forbes 30 under 30 in 2013. In 2021, he was included on the Time 100 Next.
