= Retailtainment =

Retailtainment is retail marketing as entertainment. In his book, Enchanting a Disenchanted World: Revolutionizing the Means of Consumption (1999), author George Ritzer describes "retailtainment" as the "use of ambience, emotion, sound and activity to get customers interested in the merchandise and in a mood to buy."

Sometimes called "inspirational retailing" or "entertailing," it has also been defined as "the modern trend of combining shopping and entertainment opportunities as an anchor for customers."

In 2001, Codeluppi described it as a way for marketers to "offer the consumer physical and emotional sensations during the shopping experience." And, in an article entitled "Using sonic branding in the retail environment" in the 2003 issue of the Journal of Consumer Behaviour, Fulberg described it as a way for retailers to entertain the consumer with a dramatization of their values."

According to Michael Morrison at the Australian Centre for Retail Studies:

“There is a move towards the concept of 'retailtainment.' This phenomenon, which brings together retailing, entertainment, music and leisure ... Retailers need to look further than the traditional retail store elements such as colour, lighting and visual merchandising to influence buying decisions. The specific atmosphere the retailer creates can, in some cases, be more influential in the decision-making process than the product itself. As goods and services become more of a commodity, it is what a shopper experiences and what atmosphere retailers create that really matters. Brand building is a combination of physical, functional, operational and psychological elements. Consumers will be willing to pay more for a brand if there is a perceived or actual added value from their experience of using the product or service.”

Shopper marketing expert Simon Temperley of Los Angeles agency The Marketing Arm, formerly U.S. Marketing & Promotions (Usmp), describes "retailtainment" as a "live brand experience" that frequently includes the use of "brand ambassadors" who "converse with the consumer."
