= Retail concentration =

Retail concentration refers to the market share generally belonging to the top 4 or 5 mass distribution firms present in a regional market, as a percentage of the total.

Retail concentration is not simply a concentration ratio as is emerging in the food sector. This is due to two factors: the particular relevance retail is gaining on a global scale, and the particular shape of the food supply chain.

In recent years, retail concentration moved ahead with fusions and acquisitions along the entire food supply chain. We can assume with Grievink (2003) that in a few years there will be only 5 dominant actors in the globalised food chain. The same researcher states that in the 90's the top-5 food manufacturers could count on twice the cash flow of the top-5 retailers. Nowadays the relation is inverted: the top 5 retailers can count on twice that of the top-5 manufacturers.

Thus, the food chain has become increasingly vertically integrated, with global corporations able to coordinate inputs from the seed to the field, from the stable to the table. Retail concentration by one hand is the answer that retail is giving to compete with the giants of agrofood industry. By the other hand, is the agrofood industry in itself searching to arrive directly to the consumers, through a refined relations system. In this process, private labels are increasingly attracting consumers, and are expected to grow more and more on their fidelisation strategy, beating on quality, safety and also ethical values.

In 2008, the European Commission proposed solutions to face with overall price increase about foodstuffs. Among the measures proposed, several relate to the retail power recently acquired.

In particular, the payments delay to the producers; the additional fees asked to the producers to place on the shelves branded products; price transparency; better regulation on promotional activities and openings/closing time are all issues on the agenda.

For supporters, retail concentration means more chances for consumers, lower prices, better quality. For opponents, by the contrary, the disappearing of traditional shops, of food culture, of neighborhood life in general. Furthermore, too much concentration means squeezing the price of industry and of agriculture, which can lead to outsourcing food from anywhere it can cost less, without a truly long term impact assessment.

Tim Lang described the retail concentration phenomenon such as a "food war", in which winners and losers take place. Tim Lang talks about "food clusters" to better handle the idea of concentration along the entire food chain. There are a lot of legal instruments which allow to get more and more concentrated, acquisition being one, along with mergers, joint ventures, partnerships and more not formalised contracts/ agreements. Note that the "hypermarketization" is not limited to the Western World, but supermarkets rise fast also in the less developed countries and in the East and in the South of the World. Regarding that, there are a lot of concerns, pretending that the overwhelming power of retailing is making poorer and poorer farmers, in particular in the LDC (Less Developed Countries). The "crowding out" effect on local agricultures is basically due to the global sourcing of the produces, wherever they cost less and offer more. To say it with the words of the Italian food-thinker Corrado Finardi to fairly function, the agricultural system has a different, slower timeline than the market (in agriculture counts the long term investment, while on the global market it is more important the precise moment in which supply and demand match).

== See also ==
- Concentration of media ownership
