= Retail design =

Creative and commercial discipline

Retail design is a multidisciplinary field of architecture and interior design concerned with the design and construction of retail environments. It also draws on industrial design, graphic design, ergonomics, and advertising.

Retail design is a specialized discipline concerned with the functional and commercial requirements of retail space. Because retail environments are designed to display and sell products to consumers, their layouts and physical features are planned to support the shopping experience and the presentation of merchandise.

Research has shown that aspects of the physical retail environment can influence shoppers' behaviour and evaluations. For example, one study found that accidental interpersonal touch affected shopping time and consumers' evaluations of brands. The design of a retail space also varies according to the type of merchandise being sold; for example, a bookstore may require extensive shelving for categorized products, while a clothing store may require more open space for product display. The space must be specially-tailored to the kind of product being sold in that space; for example, a bookstore requires many large shelving units to accommodate small products that can be arranged categorically while a clothing store requires more open space to fully display product.

Retail spaces, especially when they form part of a retail chain, must also be designed to draw people into the space to shop. The storefront must act as a billboard for the store, often employing large display windows that allow shoppers to see into the space and the products inside. In the case of a retail chain, the individual spaces must be unified in their design.

== History ==
Retail design developed alongside the expansion of modern department stores during the 19th century. Major stores such as Le Bon Marché and Printemps in Paris helped establish new approaches to the organization and presentation of merchandise. Similar developments subsequently appeared in other major cities, including Chicago, London, and New York.

In Belgium, the Dewachter brothers established a chain of clothing stores in the late 19th century. The business expanded from its initial locations to stores in Belgium and France, illustrating the development of standardized retail formats across multiple locations. The firm opened with fou and, by 1904, Maison Dewachter (House of Dewachter) had stores in 20 cities and towns in Belgium and France, with multiple stores in some cities.

The first retail chain store in the United States was opened in the early 20th century by Frank Winfield Woolworth, which quickly became a franchise across the US. Other chain stores began growing in places like the UK a decade or so later, with stores like Boots. After World War II, a new type of retail design building known as the shopping center came into being. This type of building took two different paths in comparison between the US and Europe. Shopping centers began being built out of town within the United States to benefit the suburban family, while Europe began putting shopping centers in the middle of town. The first shopping center in the Netherlands was built in the 1950s, as retail design ideas began spreading east.

The next evolution of retail design was the creation of the boutique in the 1960s, which emphasized retail design run by individuals. Some of the earliest examples of boutiques are the Biba boutique created by Barbara Hulanicki and the Habitat line of stores made by Terence Conran. The rise of the boutique was followed, in the next two decades, with an overall increase in consumer spending across the developed world. This rise made retail design shift to compensate for increased customers and alternative focuses. Many retail design stores redesigned themselves over the period to keep up with changing consumer tastes. These changes resulted on one side with the creation of multiple "expensive, one-off designer shops" catering to specific fashion designers and retailers.

The rise of the internet and internet retailing in the latter part of the 20th century and into the 21st century saw another change in retail design to compensate. Many different sectors not related to the internet reached out to retail design and its practices to lure online shoppers back to physical shops, where retail design can be properly utilized.

== Usage ==
=== Role ===
A retail designer must create a thematic experience for the consumer, by using spatial cues to entertain as well as entice the consumer to purchase goods and interact with the space. The success of their designs are not measured by design critics but rather the records of the store which compare amount of foot traffic against the overall productivity. Retail designers have an acute awareness that the store and their designs are the background to the merchandise and are only there to represent and create the best possible environment in which to reflect the merchandise to the target consumer group.

=== Design elements ===
Since the evolution of retail design and its impact on productivity have become clear, a series of standardizations in the techniques and design qualities has been determined. These standardizations range from alterations to the perspective of the structure of the space, entrances, circulation systems, atmospheric qualities (light and sound) and materiality. By exploring these standardizations in retail design the consumer will be given a thematic experience that entices them to purchase the merchandise. It is also important to acknowledge that a retail space must combine both permanent and non permanent features that allow it to change as the needs of the consumer and merchandise change (e.g. per season).

The structure of retail space creates the constraints of the overall design; often the spaces already exist, and have had many prior uses. It is at this stage that logistics must be determined; structural features like columns, stairways, ceiling height, windows and emergency exits all must be factored into the final design. In retail one hundred percent of the space must be utilised and have a purpose. The floor plan creates the circulation which then directly controls the direction of the traffic flow based on the studied psychology of consumer movement pattern within a retail space. Circulation is important because it ensures that the consumer moves through the store from front to back, guiding them to important displays and, in the end, to the cashier. There are six basic store layouts and circulation plans that all provide a different experience:

1. Straight plan: this plan divides transitional areas from one part of the store to the other by using walls to display merchandise. It also leads the consumer to the back of the store. This design can be used for a variety of stores ranging from pharmacies to apparel.
2. Pathway plan: is most suitable for large stores that are single level. In this plan there is a path unobstructed by shop fixtures that smoothly guides the consumer through to the back of the store. This is well suited for apparel department stores, as the clothes will be easily accessible.
3. Diagonal plan: uses perimeter design which cause angular traffic flow. The cashier is in a central location and easily accessible. This plan is most suited for self-service retail.
4. Curved plan: aims to create an intimate environment that is inviting. In this plan there is an emphasis on the structure of the space including the walls, corners and ceiling. This is achieved by making the structure curved and is enhanced by circular floor fixtures. Although this is a more expensive layout, it is more suited to smaller spaces like salons and boutiques.
5. Varied plan: in this plan attention is drawn to special focus areas, as well as having storage areas that line the wall. This is best suited for footwear and jewelry retail stores.
6. Geometric plan: uses the racks and the retail floor fixtures to create a geometric floor plan and circulation movement. By lowering parts of the ceiling certain areas can create defined retail spaces. This is well suited for apparel stores.

Once the overall structure and circulation of the space has been determined, the atmosphere and thematics of the space must be created through lighting, sound, materials and visual branding. These design elements will cohesively have the greatest impact on the consumer and thus the level of productivity that could be achieved.

Lighting can have a dramatic impact on the space. It needs to be functional, but also complement the merchandise and emphasize key points throughout the store. The lighting should be layered and of a variety of intensities and fixtures. Firstly, examine the natural light and what impact it has in the space. Natural light adds interest and clarity to the space; consumers also prefer to examine the quality of merchandise in natural light. If no natural light exists, a sky light can be used to introduce it to the retail space. The lighting of the ceiling and roof is the next thing to consider. This lighting should wash the structural features while creating vectors that direct the consumer to key merchandise selling areas. The next layer should emphasize the selling areas. These lights should be direct but not too bright and harsh. Poor lighting can cause eye strain and an uncomfortable experience for the consumer. To minimize the possibility of eye strain, the ratio of luminance should decrease between merchandise selling areas. The next layer will complement and bring focus onto the merchandise; this lighting should be flattering for the merchandise and consumer. The final layer is to install functional lighting such as clear exit signs.

Ambiance can then be developed within the atmosphere through sound and audio. The music played within the store should reflect what the store's target market would be drawn to. This would also be developed through the merchandise that is being marketed. In a lingerie store the music should be soft, feminine and romanticized, whereas in a technology department the music would be more upbeat and more masculine.

Materiality is another key selling tool. The choices made must not only be aesthetically pleasing and persuasive but also functional with a minimal need for maintenance. Retail spaces are high traffic areas and are thus exposed to a lot of wear. This means that possible finishes of the materials should be durable. The warmth of a material will make the space more inviting; a floor that is firm and somewhat buoyant will be more comfortable for that consumer to walk on and thus will allow them to take longer when exploring the store. By switching materials throughout the store, zones/areas can be defined. For example, by making the path one material and contrasting it against another for the selling areas, consumers are guided through the store. Color is also important to consider; it must not over power or clash against the merchandise but rather create a complementary background for the merchandise. As merchandise will change seasonally the interior colors should not be trend based but rather have timeless appeal like neutral based colors.

Visual branding of the store can create a memorable experience for the consumer to take with them once they leave the store, encouraging their return. Examples include consistent exterior branding and signage continuing into the interior, dramatization of the store, or font consistency with font size altering. The interior branding can help consumers easily direct themselves through the store. Sales signs placement can draw consumers in and show exactly where the cashier is located. The branding can reflect the merchandise and what the target market would be drawn to.

=== Perspective ===
The final element of a well-executed retail space is the staging of the consumer's perspective. It is the role of retail design to have total control of the view that the consumer will have of the retail space. From the exterior of a retail store the consumer should have a clear unobstructed view into the interior.

== See also ==
- Architecture
- Brand
- Branded environments
- Brand implementation
- Customer engagement
- Display case
- Display window
- Ergonomics
- Interior design
- Marketing
- Merchandising
- Planogram
- Retail chain
- Retailing
- Visual merchandising
