= Retail software =

Software on physical media sold to end consumers

Retail software is computer software, typically installed on PC-type computers post 2005, delivered via the Internet (also known as cloud-based). Traditionally this software was delivered via physical data storage media sold to end consumer but very few companies still provide their software using physical media. The software is typically sold under restricted licenses (e.g. EULAs) or in the case of cloud-based software sold as a Software-as-a-Service (SaaS) model.

== Types ==
Cloud-based software: this is software that is not installed on a user's device but delivered on-demand via the Internet to the end user's device(s) either through web-based apps or native apps (iOS and Android). Most new software companies provide both or a combination of web, and native apps which may provide different functionality depending on the actual user in a client company.

OEM Pack — This is a licensed copy of software given by the software manufacturer to a computer manufacturer to pre-install on a computer being sold to a customer. A backup copy may or may not be provided on a CD to the end-user along with the computer.

Box Pack - This is a licensed copy of the software that an end-user buys off the shelf from any authorized retail outlet. They may sometimes be more highly-priced than OEM versions as you generally get additional software along with the main software within the pack.

Paper License - This is a scheme provided by the software manufacturer to companies or businesses that require many copies of particular software to be installed on multiple computers within the organization (Volume license key). Say, for example, a company requires installing software on 50 computers in its office. Instead of buying 50 CDs and managing those 50 individually, the company can buy one copy of the software and request the software vendor to issue a paper license authorizing them to use it on 50 computers. The software vendor then charges them accordingly. This method is also much cheaper than buying 50 individual packs.

== History ==
An important historical event that led to the expansion of the market for retail software was the Open Letter to Hobbyists by Bill Gates in 1976.

Until the 2000s with the emergence of the Internet, retail software represented the vast majority of all end consumer software used and was referred to as shrinkware because of software almost always ships in a shrinkwrapped box.

The most famous examples of retail software are the products offered on the IBM PC and clones in the 1980s and 1990s, including famous programs like Lotus 123, Word Perfect and the various parts that make up Microsoft Office. Microsoft Windows is also shrinkware, but is most often pre-installed on the computer.

The rise of the Internet and software licensing schemes has dramatically changed the retail software market e.g. by Digital Distribution. Users are capable of finding shareware, freeware and free software products or use Web services as easily as retail. Producers of proprietary software have shifted to providing much of their software and services via the Internet, including Google, Microsoft, Yahoo!, and Apple Inc. Software is also becoming available as part of an integrated device, as well.

In 2011 Apple declared the discontinuation of many of its boxed retail software products.

== See also ==
- Proprietary software
