= D.E. Shaw (disambiguation) =

The word generally means D. E. Shaw & Co, an American hedge fund, but may also refer to:

- David E. Shaw, an American billionaire and investment banker
- D. E. Shaw Research, an American biochemistry research company
