= 2021 New Jersey gubernatorial election =

- November 2, 2021
- Turnout: 40.5% (▲2.0%)
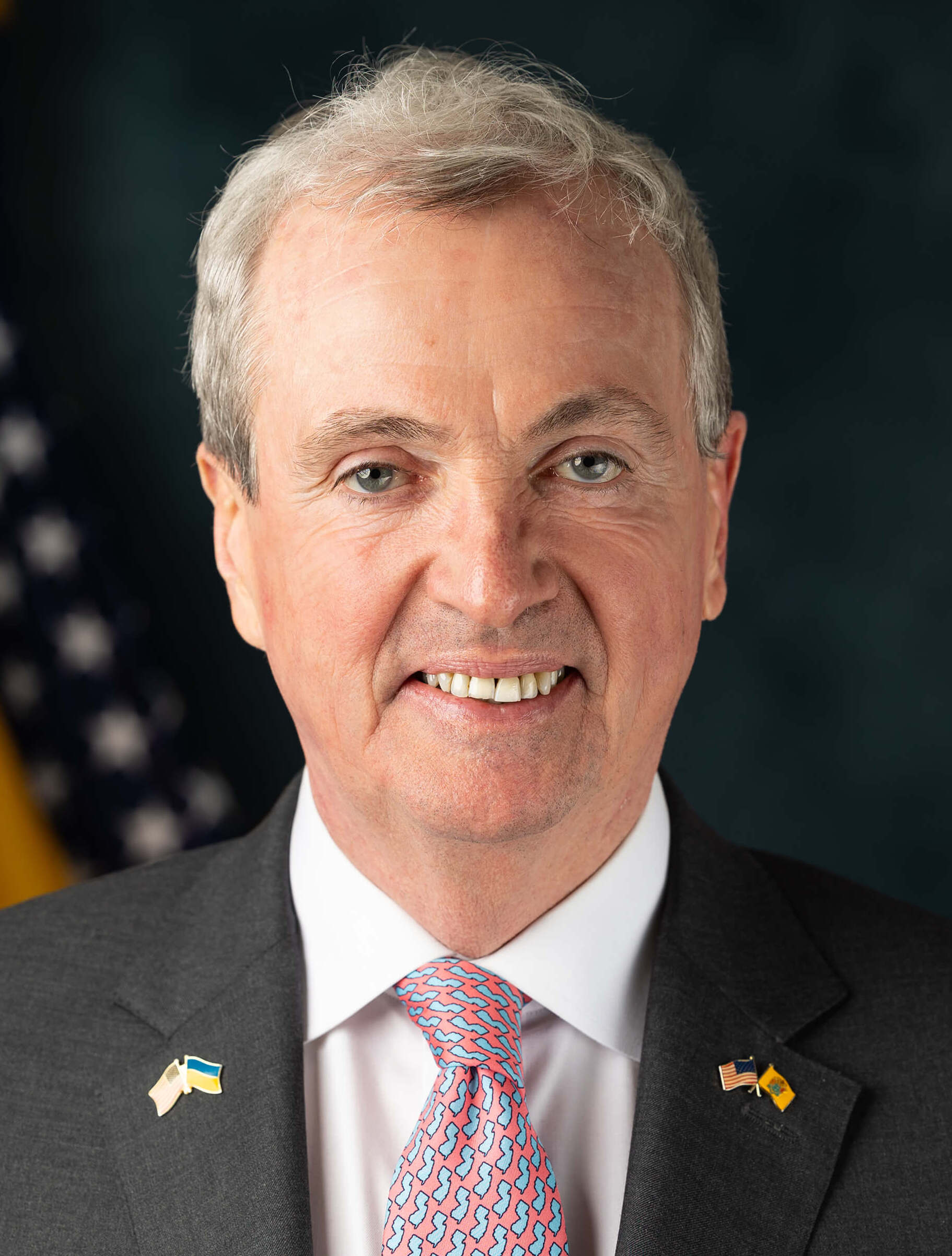

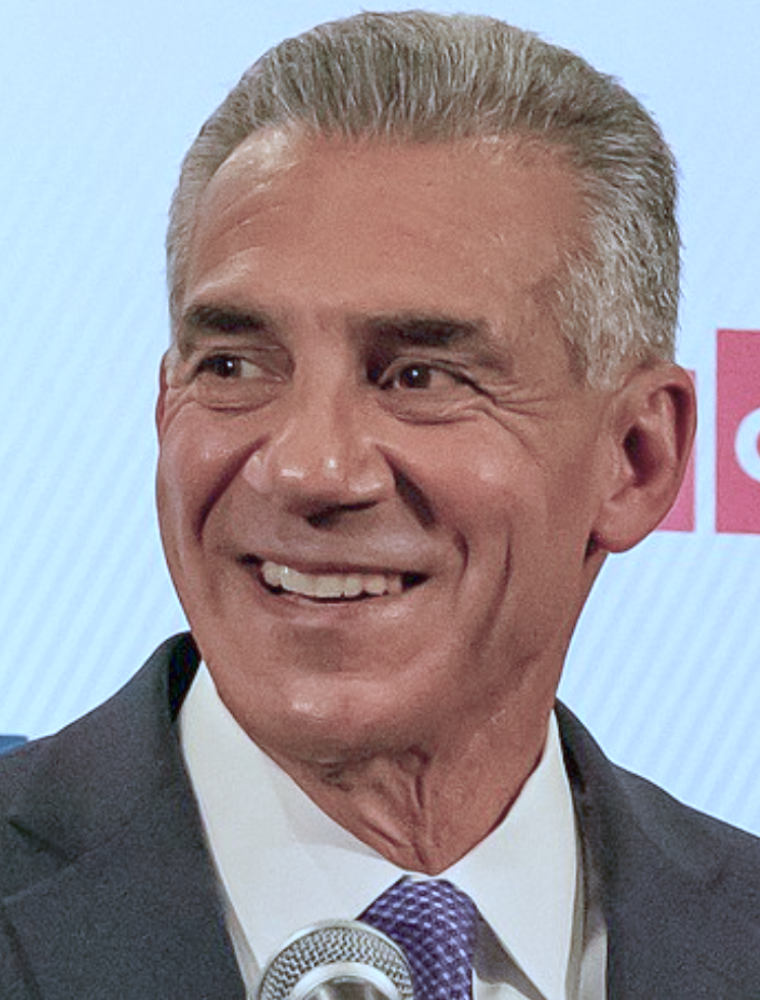
Nominee	Phil Murphy	Jack Ciattarelli
Party	Democratic	Republican
Running mate	Sheila Oliver	Diane Allen
Popular vote	1,339,471	1,255,185
Percentage	51.22%	48.00%
- Murphy: 40–50% 50–60% 60–70% 70–80% 80–90% >90% Ciattarelli: 40–50% 50–60% 60–70% 70–80% 80–90% Tie: 40–50% 50% No votes
Governor before election
Phil Murphy
Democratic
Elected Governor
Phil Murphy
Democratic

The 2021 New Jersey gubernatorial election was held on November 2, 2021, to elect the governor of New Jersey. Incumbent Governor Phil Murphy was first elected in 2017 with 56% of the vote and won re-election to a second term. Murphy and his running mate, Lt. Gov. Sheila Oliver, defeated the Republican ticket of Jack Ciattarelli and Diane Allen, 51.2% to 48%.

Murphy formally announced his intention to run for a second term on October 1, 2020. Primaries were held on June 8, 2021. Murphy, who won the Democratic nomination unopposed after his two primary challengers were disqualified, faced Ciattarelli, Green nominee Madelyn Hoffman, Libertarian nominee Gregg Mele, and Socialist Workers Party nominee Joanne Kuniansky in the general election. The race was considered by many media outlets to be a "safe" or "likely" Democratic hold, as Murphy had led a majority of pre-election polls by double digits. However, Murphy defeated Ciattarelli by a much smaller margin than expected.

Murphy is the first Democratic governor of New Jersey to win re-election since Brendan Byrne in 1977, as well as the first candidate of the same party as the incumbent U.S. president to win since Thomas Kean in 1985. This is also the first New Jersey gubernatorial election since 2009 where both the Democratic and Republican nominees received more than one million votes each. It also was the first New Jersey gubernatorial election where the Green Party candidate placed third. Murphy also became the first Democrat to win a New Jersey gubernatorial election without carrying Gloucester and Cumberland Counties since Robert B. Meyner in 1953, and the first Democrat to win a gubernatorial election without carrying Atlantic County since Richard J. Hughes in 1961.

Atlantic County voted for the losing candidate for the first time since 1993. Also, this was the first New Jersey gubernatorial election in which Somerset County voted more Democratic than the state as a whole since 1910. Murphy became the first New Jersey Governor since Brendan Byrne to win both of his elections with a majority of the vote each time. It was the first single-digit Democratic win in a governor's election since 1961. Murphy received the most votes for a Democrat or any governor since 1989, and Ciattarelli received the most for a Republican since 2013. Despite failing to flip the state, Ciattarelli swung the state more Republican from the 2020 presidential election than Glenn Youngkin, the Republican candidate for the concurrent Virginia gubernatorial election, did in his respective state even as he managed to flip the governorship. Ciattarelli also won three counties that Murphy won in 2017: Atlantic, Cumberland, and Gloucester.

== Democratic primary ==
=== Candidates ===
==== Nominee ====
- Phil Murphy, incumbent governor (2018–present)

==== Disqualified ====
- Roger Bacon, perennial candidate
- Lisa McCormick, candidate for U.S. Senate in 2018

==== Declined ====
- Jamel Holley, state assemblyman from the 20th district (ran for State Senate)
- Stephen M. Sweeney, President of the New Jersey Senate (running for re-election)

=== Fundraising ===
Primary campaign finance activity through June 28, 2021
Candidate	Raised	Spent	Cash on hand
Phil Murphy	$7,966,075	$7,752,229	$213,846
Source: New Jersey Election Law Enforcement Commission

=== Lieutenant gubernatorial nomination ===
==== Nominee ====
- Sheila Oliver, incumbent Lieutenant Governor (2018–2023)

=== Results ===
Democratic primary results
Party	Candidate	Votes	%
Democratic	Phil Murphy (incumbent)	382,984	100.0%
Total votes		382,984	100.0%

== Republican primary ==
=== Candidates ===
==== Nominee ====
- Jack Ciattarelli, former member of the New Jersey General Assembly from the 16th district (2011–2018) and candidate for governor in 2017

==== Eliminated in primary ====
- Brian Levine, former Somerset County commissioner (2014–2020), former mayor of Franklin Township, Somerset County (2004–2014) and candidate for governor in 2009
- Phil Rizzo, pastor
- Hirsh Singh, businessman, engineer, and perennial candidate

==== Withdrew ====
- Joseph Rudy Rullo, businessman, actor and perennial candidate (endorsed Hirsh Singh)
- Doug Steinhardt, chair of the Warren County Republican Committee (2004–present), former mayor of Lopatcong (1999–2014) and former Chair of the New Jersey Republican State Committee (2017–2020)
- Joseph Vicari, Ocean County commissioner

==== Declined ====
- Jon Bramnick, minority leader of the New Jersey General Assembly (running for State Senate)
- Chris Christie, former governor of New Jersey (2010–2018)
- Joe Kyrillos, former state senator and assemblyman from the 13th district, Republican nominee for New Jersey's 6th congressional district in 1992, and Republican nominee for U.S. Senate in 2012
- Rik Mehta, pharmaceutical executive, attorney, and Republican nominee for U.S. Senate in 2020 (running for NJ-07 in 2022) (endorsed Jack Ciattarelli)
- Holly Schepisi, state assemblywoman (2012–2021) and senator (2021–present) from the 39th district (running for State Senate) (endorsed Jack Ciattarelli)

=== Fundraising ===
Primary campaign finance activity through June 28, 2021
Candidate	Raised	Spent	Cash on hand
Jack Ciattarelli	$7,125,870	$7,045,692	$69,178
Brian Levine	<$5,800	<$5,800	<$5,800
Phil Rizzo	$678,619	$655,282	$23,337
Hirsh Singh	$616,398	$615,931	$468
Doug Steinhardt (withdrew)	$248,345	$221,819	$26,527
Source: New Jersey Election Law Enforcement Commission

=== Endorsements ===
Hirsh Singh

Individuals

- Joseph Rudy Rullo, businessman, actor, and perennial candidate
Phil Rizzo

State Legislators

- Serena DiMaso, state assemblywoman from the 13th district (2018–2022)

Individuals

- Kimberly Klacik, Republican nominee for Maryland's 7th congressional district in the April 2020 special election and the November 2020 general election
- Bill Spadea, New Jersey 101.5 radio personality and Republican nominee for New Jersey's 12th congressional district in 2004

=== Lieutenant gubernatorial nomination ===
==== Nominee ====
- Diane Allen, former state senator from the 7th district (1998–2018) and candidate for US Senate in 2002

==== Potential candidates not selected ====
- Holly Schepisi, state assemblywoman (2012–2021) and senator (2021–present) from the 39th district

On May 4, 2021, the New Jersey Globe published a list of nine potential candidates for lieutenant governor after speaking with "more than two dozen Republican leaders, strategists and activists." Diane Allen (who was selected as Republican gubernatorial nominee Jack Ciattarelli's running mate) was one of the names on this list. The others were:

- Kristin Corrado, state senator from the 40th district (2017–present), chair of the New Jersey Senate Republican Conference (2019–present)
- Antony Ghee, candidate for New Jersey's 11th congressional district in 2018, hedge fund manager, and U.S. Army JAG captain
- Christine Hanlon, Monmouth County Clerk (2015–present)
- Barbara Kim-Hagemann, New Jersey VFW State Commander
- Nancy Munoz, state assemblywoman from the 21st district (2009–present)
- Laura Overdeck, businesswoman and philanthropist (founder and president of Bedtime Math and co-founder of the Women for a Stronger New Jersey Super-PAC)
- Ryan Peters, state assemblyman from the 8th district (2018–present) (will not be running for re-election to the State Assembly)
- Michele Siekerka, President & CEO of the New Jersey Business and Industry Association (2014–present) and former New Jersey Department of Environmental Protection Deputy Commissioner (2010–2014) in the Christie administration

=== Debates ===
2021 New Jersey Republican gubernatorial primary debates
No.	Date	Host	Moderator	Link	Participants			
Key: P Participant A Absent N Non-invitee I Invitee W Withdrawn								
Key: P Participant A Absent N Non-invitee I Invitee W Withdrawn					Jack Ciattarelli	Brian Levine	Phil Rizzo	Hirsh Singh
1	May 25, 2021	WKXW	Eric Scott		P	N	N	P

A second debate on NJ PBS featuring Ciattarelli and Singh and moderated by NJ Spotlight News reporters Briana Vannozzi, Colleen O'Dea, and David Cruz was planned for May 26, 2021, but later cancelled on May 24, 2021, after Singh announced that he would decline to participate.

=== Polling ===
Poll source	Date(s) administered	Sample size (Note: Key: A – all adults RV – registered voters LV – likely voters V – unclear)	Margin of error	Jack Ciattarelli	Brian Levine	Phil Rizzo	Hirsh Singh	Undecided
Public Policy Polling (D) (Note: This poll was sponsored by the Democratic Governors Association)	May 24–25, 2021	591 (LV)	± 4.1%	29%	2%	8%	23%	38%
Brad Parscale (R) (Note: Internal poll for the Hirsh Singh campaign)	April 16–21, 2021	>1200 (LV)	± 3.0%	20%	3%	10%	22%	–

=== Results ===
Results by county: Ciattarelli: 60–70%; 50–60%; 40–50%; <40%

Republican primary results
Party	Candidate	Votes	%
Republican	Jack Ciattarelli	167,690	49.46%
Republican	Philip Rizzo	87,007	25.66%
Republican	Hirsh V. Singh	73,155	21.58%
Republican	Brian D. Levine	11,181	3.30%
Total votes		339,033	100.0%

== General election ==
Five candidates appeared on the general election ballot, the lowest number of candidates for a New Jersey gubernatorial election since 1953, which also featured five.

=== Candidates ===
- Phil Murphy (Democratic), incumbent governor (2018–present)
  - Running mate: Sheila Oliver, lieutenant governor (2018–2023)
- Jack Ciattarelli (Republican), former state assemblyman from the 16th district (2011–2018) and candidate for governor in 2017
  - Running mate: Diane Allen, former state senator from the 7th district (1998–2018)
- Gregg Mele (Libertarian), activist, lawyer, and candidate for New Jersey's 7th congressional district in 2018
  - Running mate: Eveline Brownstein, activist and professor
- Madelyn R. Hoffman (Green), environmental activist, professor, and candidate for governor in 1997 and U.S. Senate in 2018 and 2020
  - Running mate: Heather Warburton, activist and talk show host
- Joanne Kuniansky (Socialist Workers), retail worker
  - Running mate: Vivian Sahner, militant author

==== Withdrew ====
- Ed Forchion (Legalize Marijuana), cannabis rights activist and perennial candidate
- Justin Maldonado
- David Winkler

=== Fundraising ===
General election campaign finance activity through November 19, 2021
Candidate	Raised	Spent	Cash on hand
Phil Murphy	$16,747,434	$16,393,069	$354,365
Jack Ciattarelli	$16,361,174	$15,828,691	$532,483
Gregg Mele	$6,000	<$5,800	N/A
Madelyn Hoffman	$1,874	<$5,800	<$5,800
Joanne Kuniansky	<$5,800	<$5,800	<$5,800
Source: New Jersey Election Law Enforcement Commission

=== Debates ===
Although New Jersey State Law gives until September 1, 2021, for independent gubernatorial candidates to fundraise $490,000 to qualify for the debates, the invitees of the first debate were definitively stated at around July 20, 2021, which was over a month before the deadline. Despite the third-party candidates being ineligible to debate in any debates that were sponsored by the New Jersey Election Law Enforcement Commission, the New Jersey Globe held another debate for third-party lieutenant governor candidates on October 11, 2021.

2021 New Jersey gubernatorial debates
No.	Date	Host	Moderator	Link	Democratic	Republican	Libertarian	Green	Socialist Workers
P Participant A Absent N Non-invitee I Invitee W Withdrawn					Phil Murphy	Jack Ciattarelli	Gregg Mele	Madelyn Hoffman	Joanne Kuniansky
1	September 28, 2021	NJPAC	Sade Baderinwa; Brian Taff		P	P	N	N	N
2	October 12, 2021	NJ PBS	Briana Vannozzi		P	P	N	N	N

2021 New Jersey Lieutenant Governor debates
No.	Date	Host	Moderator	Link	Democratic	Republican	Libertarian	Green	Socialist Workers
P Participant A Absent N Non-invitee I Invitee W Withdrawn					Sheila Oliver	Diane Allen	Eveline Brownstein	Heather Warburton	Vivian Sahner
1	October 5, 2021	New Jersey Globe	David Wildstein; Shenell McCloud; Micah Rasmussen		P	P	N	N	N
2	October 11, 2021	New Jersey Globe	Joey Fox		N	N	P	P	W

=== Predictions ===
Source	Ranking	As of
The Cook Political Report	Solid D	October 5, 2021
Inside Elections	Solid D	November 1, 2021
Sabato's Crystal Ball	Likely D	November 1, 2021

=== Endorsements ===
Phil Murphy (D)

Executive branch officials

- Joe Biden, President of the United States (2021–2025)
- Kamala Harris, Vice President of the United States (2021–2025)
- Barack Obama, former President of the United States (2009–2017)
- Kal Penn, former Principal Associate Director of the White House Office of Public Engagement (2009–2011)

U.S. Senators

- Cory Booker, U.S. Senator from New Jersey (2013–present)
- Amy Klobuchar, U.S. Senator from Minnesota (2007–present)
- Bob Menendez, U.S. Senator from New Jersey (2006–2024)
- Bernie Sanders, U.S. Senator from Vermont (2007–present)

U.S. Representatives

- Jim Clyburn, U.S. Representative for South Carolina's 6th congressional district (1993–present) and House Minority Whip (2011-2019)
- Bonnie Watson Coleman, U.S. Representative for New Jersey's 12th congressional district (2015–present)
- Gabby Giffords, former U.S. Representative for Arizona's 8th congressional district (2007–2012)
- Josh Gottheimer, U.S. Representative for New Jersey's 5th congressional district (2017–present)
- Andy Kim, U.S. Representative for New Jersey's 3rd congressional district (2019–2025)
- Donald Norcross, U.S. Representative for New Jersey's 1st congressional district (2014–present)
- Frank Pallone, U.S. Representative for New Jersey's 6th congressional district (1988–present)
- Bill Pascrell, U.S. Representative for New Jersey's 9th congressional district (2013–2024)
- Donald Payne Jr., U.S. Representative for New Jersey's 10th congressional district (2012–2024)
- Mikie Sherrill, U.S. Representative for New Jersey's 11th congressional district (2019–2025)
- Albio Sires, U.S. Representative for New Jersey's 8th congressional district (2013–2023)

State legislators

- Craig Coughlin, state assemblyman from the 19th district (2010–present) and Speaker of the New Jersey State Assembly (2019–present)
- Vin Gopal, state senator from the 11th district (2018–present)
- Teresa Ruiz, state senator from the 29th district (2008–present) and President pro tempore of the New Jersey Senate (2018–2022)
- Loretta Weinberg, state senator from the 37th district (2005–2022) and majority leader of the New Jersey State Senate (2012–2022)

County executives

- Thomas DeGise, Hudson County Executive (2002–2023)
- Joseph DiVincenzo, Essex County Executive (2003–present)

Local officials

- Ras Baraka, mayor of Newark, New Jersey (2014–present)
- Ravinder Bhalla, mayor of Hoboken, New Jersey (2018–present)
- Steven Fulop, mayor of Jersey City, New Jersey (2013–present)
- Susan Knudsen, mayor of Ridgewood, New Jersey (Republican)
- Anthony Vaz, mayor of Seaside Heights, New Jersey (2015–present) (Republican)

Individuals

- Jill Biden, First Lady of the United States (2021–2025)
- Doug Emhoff, Second Gentleman of the United States (2021–2025)
- Brian Fallon, musician
- Fred Guttenberg, activist
- Jon Bon Jovi, singer-songwriter
- John Rzeznik, musician
- Avi Schnall, director of New Jersey Agudath Israel of America (Republican)

Organizations

- AAPI Victory Fund
- Make the Road Action
- Moms Demand Action
- New Jersey Coalition of Latino Pastors and Ministers
- New Jersey League of Conservation Voters
- Working Families Party
- Garden State Equality
- Sierra Club

Labor unions

- Health Professionals and Allied Employees
- International Brotherhood of Electrical Workers New Jersey State Electrical Workers Association Construction division
- International Federation of Professional and Technical Engineers
- International Union of Operating Engineers Local 825
- Jersey City Police Benevolent Association
- Retail, Wholesale and Department Store Union
- UH Local 54
- UFCW

Newspapers

- Asbury Park Press
- Courier News
- Daily Record
- Home News Tribune
- New Jersey Herald
- New York Daily News
- The Philadelphia Inquirer
- The Record
- The Star-Ledger
Jack Ciattarelli (R)

Executive branch officials

- Nikki Haley, former Governor of South Carolina (2011–2017) and United States ambassador to the United Nations (2017–2018)

Governors

- Doug Ducey, Governor of Arizona (2015–2023) and the Chairman of the Republican Governors Association (2020–2022)
- Donald DiFrancesco, former Governor of New Jersey (2001–2002) and president of the New Jersey Senate (1992–2002)
- Larry Hogan, Governor of Maryland (2015–2023)

U.S. Representatives

- Frank LoBiondo, former U.S. Representative from New Jersey's 2nd congressional district (1995–2019)
- Jeff Van Drew, U.S. Representative from New Jersey's 2nd congressional district (2019–present)

State legislators

- Diane Allen, former state senator from the 7th district (1998–2018)
- John F. Amodeo, former state assemblyman from the 2nd district (2008–2014)
- Christopher "Kip" Bateman, state senator from the 16th district (2008–2022)
- Chris A. Brown, state senator from the 2nd district (2018–2021)
- Anthony M. Bucco, state senator from the 25th district (2019–present)
- Larry Chatzidakis, former state assemblyman from the 8th district (1997–2008)
- Kristin Corrado, state senator from the 40th district (2017–present), Chair of the New Jersey Senate Republican Conference (2019–present)
- BettyLou DeCroce, state assemblywoman from the 26th district (2012–2022)
- Christopher DePhillips, state assemblyman from the 40th district (2018–present)
- Aura Dunn, state assemblywoman from the 25th district (2019–present)
- Thomas Kean Jr., state senator from the 21st district (2003–2022) and Senate Minority Leader (2008–2022)
- J. Edward Kline, former state assemblyman from the 2nd district (1985–1990)
- Kenneth LeFevre, former state assemblyman from the 2nd district (1996–2002)
- Gerry Nardello, former interim state assemblywoman from the 8th district (2011–2012)
- Ryan Peters, state assemblyman from the 8th district (2018–2022)
- Vincent Polistina, former state assemblyman from the 2nd district (2008–2012) and candidate for state senate in the 2nd district in 2021
- Kevin J. Rooney, state assemblyman from the 40th district (2016–2024)
- Gerard Scharfenberger, state assemblyman from the 13th district (2020–present)
- Holly Schepisi, state assemblywoman (2012–2021) and senator (2021–present) from the 39th district
- Jean Stanfield, state assemblywoman from the 8th district (2020–2022)
- Mike Testa, state senator from the 1st district (2019–present)

Individuals

- Ronna McDaniel, Chair of the RNC (2017–2024)
- Steve Rogers, Donald Trump 2016 presidential campaign advisor

Newspapers

- New York Post

Trade associations

- ABC
- NFIB
Declined to endorse

Labor unions

- New Jersey Fraternal Order of Police

Organizations

- NJ Right to Life (Note: While the NJRTL recommended that voters choose Ciatarelli over Murphy, they refused to endorse him due to his support of abortion)

Newspapers

- The Jersey Journal

=== Polling ===
==== Aggregate polls ====
Source of poll aggregation	Dates administered	Dates updated	Phil Murphy (D)	Jack Ciattarelli (R)	Other/Undecided (Note: Calculated by taking the difference of 100% and all other candidates combined.)	Margin
RealClearPolitics	October 15–31, 2021	November 1, 2021	50.5%	42.7%	6.8%	Murphy +7.8%

Poll source	Date(s) administered	Sample size	Margin of error	Phil Murphy (D)	Jack Ciattarelli (R)	Other	Undecided
Research Co.	October 31 – November 1, 2021	450 (LV)	± 4.6%	50%	44%	1% (Note: "Some other candidate" with 1%)	5%
The Trafalgar Group (R)	October 29–31, 2021	1,085 (LV)	± 3.0%	49%	45%	1%	4%
Fairleigh Dickinson University	October 23–28, 2021	823 (RV)	± 3.4%	53%	44%	3% (Note: "Someone Else" with 3%; "No One" with 1%)	–
Rutgers-Eagleton	October 21–27, 2021	901 (RV)	± 4.1%	50%	42%	–	8%
Stockton University	October 17–26, 2021	522 (LV)	± 4.3%	50% (Note: With voters who lean towards a given candidate)	41%	6% (Note: "Some other candidate" with 4%; "Refused" with 2%)	3%
Stockton University	October 17–26, 2021	522 (LV)	± 4.3%	48%	40%	7% (Note: "Some other candidate" with 4%; "Refused" with 3%)	5%
Monmouth University	October 21–25, 2021	1,000 (RV)	± 3.1%	50%	39%	2% (Note: "Other candidate" with 1%; "No one" with 1%)	9%
Emerson College (Note: This poll was sponsored by PIX 11)	October 15–18, 2021	600 (LV)	± 3.9%	50%	44%	–	7%
Schoen Cooperman Research (D)	October 9–12, 2021	500 (LV)	± 4.4%	50%	41%	–	9%
Stockton University	September 17–25, 2021	552 (LV)	± 4.1%	50%	41%	6% (Note: "Some other candidiate" with 5%; "Refused" with 1%)	3%
Stockton University	September 17–25, 2021	552 (LV)	± 4.1%	47%	39%	6%	8%
Monmouth University	September 16–20, 2021	804 (RV)	± 3.5%	51%	38%	3% (Note: "Other candidate" with 2%; "No one" with <1%)	9%
National Research Inc. (R) (Note: Internal poll for the Jack Ciattarelli campaign)	September 13–16, 2021	600 (LV)	± 4.0%	45%	42%	–	10%
Fabrizio Lee & Associates (R) (Note: This poll was sponsored by Club for Growth)	August 24–29, 2021	600 (LV)	± 4.0%	43%	41%	3% (Note: Mele (L) with 2%; Hoffman (G) with 1%; Kuniansky (SW) with <1%)	14%
Fabrizio Lee & Associates (R)	August 24–29, 2021	600 (LV)	± 4.0%	46%	45%	–	9%
Monmouth University	August 11–16, 2021	810 (RV)	± 3.5%	52%	36%	3% (Note: "Other candidate" with 2%; "No one" with 1%)	9%
National Research Inc. (R)	June 17–22, 2021	600 (LV)	± 4.0%	49%	37%	–	14%
Fairleigh Dickinson University	June 9–16, 2021	803 (RV)	± 3.9%	48%	33%	5% (Note: "Someone Else" with 4%; "No One" with 1%)	14%
Rutgers University	May 21–29, 2021	493 (A)	± 5.4%	52%	24%	13% (Note: "Neither" with 7%; "Someone else" with 4%; "Would not vote" with 2%)	12%
Rutgers University	May 21–29, 2021	467 (RV)	± 5.6%	52%	26%	11% (Note: "Neither" with 6%; "Someone else" with 4%; "Would not vote" with 1%)	10%
Change Research (D) (Note: This poll was sponsored by Project Ready)	May 15–20, 2021	1,215 (A)	± 3.9%	47%	36%	–	17%
National Research Inc. (R)	April 11–13, 2021	600 (LV)	± 4.0%	47%	30%	–	23%

Hypothetical polling

Phil Murphy vs. generic opponent

Poll source	Date(s) administered	Sample size	Margin of error	Phil Murphy (D)	Generic Opponent	Other	Undecided
Rutgers-Eagleton	May 21–29, 2021	461 (RV)	–	42%	31%	21% (Note: "Consider voting for someone else besides Murphy" with 21%)	6%
Monmouth University	April 29 – May 4, 2021	706 (A)	± 3.7%	48%	43%	–	9%
Monmouth University	April 29 – May 4, 2021	661 (RV)	± 3.8%	48%	44%	–	8%

=== Results ===
During the election, several technical problems with internet connections were reported across the state after newly installed voting machines were used for the first time, resulting in machine malfunctions that were eventually resolved. This caused a delay in the final results. With 98% of the vote tallied, Ciattarelli conceded to Murphy at a news conference on November 12, 2021, and announced he would run again in 2025. This was the first time since 1949 that the winning gubernatorial candidate did not win a majority of counties, and the first since 1940 that a Democrat did so.

2021 New Jersey gubernatorial election (Note: In New Jersey, within 30 days after the certification of the statewide primary election, the candidate for governor selects a running mate to join the ticket as the candidate for lieutenant governor. The governor and lieutenant governor must be members of the same political party. As candidates they campaign on the same ticket, are elected conjointly, and serve the same four-year term concurrently.)
Party	Candidate	Votes	%	±%
Democratic	Phil Murphy (incumbent); Sheila Oliver (incumbent)	1,339,471	51.22%	–4.81
Republican	Jack Ciattarelli; Diane Allen	1,255,185	48.00%	+6.11
Green	Madelyn R. Hoffman; Heather Warburton	8,450	0.32%	–0.15
Libertarian	Gregg Mele; Eveline Brownstein	7,768	0.30%	–0.19
Socialist Workers	Joanne Kuniansky; Vivian Sahner	4,012	0.15%	N/A
Total votes		2,614,886	100.00%	N/A
Turnout		2,648,814	40.47%	+1.97
Registered electors		6,575,904		
Democratic hold				

==== By county ====
County	Phil Murphy Democratic		Jack Ciattarelli Republican		Various candidates Other parties		Margin		Total
County	#	%	#	%	#	%	#	%	Total
Atlantic	35,736	43.95%	44,977	55.32%	595	0.73%	-9,241	-11.37%	81,308
Bergen	145,150	52.52%	129,644	46.91%	1,556	0.56%	15,506	5.61%	276,350
Burlington	82,877	53.28%	71,772	46.14%	898	0.58%	11,105	7.14%	155,547
Camden	92,162	61.69%	56,016	37.50%	1,214	0.81%	36,146	24.20%	149,392
Cape May	14,183	36.69%	24,260	62.75%	218	0.56%	-10,077	-26.07%	38,661
Cumberland	13,978	43.72%	17,794	55.65%	201	0.63%	-3,816	-11.94%	31,973
Essex	132,520	73.96%	45,542	25.42%	1,105	0.62%	86,978	48.55%	179,167
Gloucester	44,959	44.63%	54,976	54.57%	813	0.81%	-10,017	-9.94%	100,748
Hudson	88,066	73.56%	30,443	25.43%	1,206	1.01%	57,623	48.13%	119,715
Hunterdon	22,820	40.19%	33,459	58.92%	505	0.89%	-10,639	-18.74%	56,784
Mercer	66,151	65.09%	34,617	34.06%	857	0.84%	31,534	31.03%	101,625
Middlesex	116,352	55.74%	90,297	43.25%	2,109	1.01%	26,055	12.48%	208,758
Monmouth	96,664	40.31%	141,100	58.84%	2,024	0.84%	-44,436	-18.53%	239,788
Morris	81,915	44.06%	102,769	55.28%	1,239	0.67%	-20,854	-11.22%	185,923
Ocean	68,615	31.79%	145,756	67.54%	1,439	0.67%	-77,141	-35.74%	215,810
Passaic	57,812	51.47%	53,551	47.68%	961	0.86%	4,261	3.79%	112,324
Salem	6,893	35.01%	12,620	64.09%	178	0.90%	-5,727	-29.08%	19,691
Somerset	58,585	51.54%	54,264	47.74%	823	0.72%	4,321	3.80%	113,672
Sussex	17,346	31.93%	36,310	66.85%	663	1.22%	-18,964	-34.91%	54,319
Union	83,913	61.56%	51,279	37.62%	1,126	0.83%	32,634	23.94%	136,318
Warren	12,774	34.56%	23,739	64.23%	444	1.20%	-10,965	-29.67%	36,957
Totals	1,339,471	51.22%	1,255,185	48.00%	20,230	0.77%	84,286	3.22%	2,614,886

Counties that flipped from Democratic to Republican

- Atlantic (largest municipality: Egg Harbor Township)
- Cumberland (largest municipality: Vineland)
- Gloucester (largest municipality: Washington Township)

==== By congressional district ====
Murphy and Ciattarelli each won six of 12 congressional districts. Four districts won by Ciattarelli were represented by Democrats in the U.S. House of Representatives.

District	Murphy	Ciattarelli	Representative
1st	56.8%	41.5%	Donald Norcross
2nd	40.2%	58.9%	Jeff Van Drew
3rd	42.5%	56.2%	Andy Kim
4th	39.6%	59.6%	Chris Smith
5th	45.9%	53.2%	Josh Gottheimer
6th	51.3%	47.7%	Frank Pallone
7th	46.5%	52.7%	Tom Malinowski
8th	73.3%	25.8%	Albio Sires
9th	57.9%	41.9%	Bill Pascrell
10th	81.4%	15.6%	Donald Payne Jr.
11th	46.4%	53.0%	Mikie Sherrill
12th	62.3%	36.8%	Bonnie Watson Coleman

== See also ==
- 2021 United States gubernatorial elections
- 2021 New Jersey State Senate election
- 2021 New Jersey General Assembly election

== Notes ==
Partisan clients
