= John Overdeck =

American billionaire and philanthropist (born c. 1969)

- Born: John Albert Overdeck; 1969 or 1970 (age 55–56)
- Education: Stanford University (BS, MS)
- Known for: Co-founder and co-chairman of Two Sigma Investments
- Spouse: Laura Bilodeau (m. 2002; sep. 2022)
- Children: 3

John Albert Overdeck (born 1969) is an American billionaire hedge fund manager. Overdeck is the co-founder and co-chairman of Two Sigma Investments, a New York City-based hedge fund that uses a variety of technological methods, including artificial intelligence, machine learning, and distributed computing for its trading strategies. In 2016, Overdeck reported $375 million in earnings and as of May 2017, Two Sigma Investments has $41 billion in assets under management.

In March 2019, he was named one of the highest-earning hedge fund managers and traders by Forbes.

== Early life ==
Overdeck is the son of Dr. John M. Overdeck of Columbia, Maryland, a retired senior mathematician at Fort Meade, Maryland, for the National Security Agency, and the late Betsey Lombard Overdeck, who was a director of Computer Sciences Corporation.

Overdeck went to Wilde Lake High School in Columbia, Maryland. In 1986, he was an International Mathematics Olympiad silver medalist. He then earned a bachelor's degree in mathematics and a master's degree in statistics, both from Stanford University.

Prior to co-founding Two Sigma Investments, Overdeck was a managing director at D.E. Shaw & Co., and a vice president at Amazon.com.

== Two Sigma Investments ==
Overdeck founded Two Sigma Investments in 2001 with David Siegel and Mark Pickard, who is now retired. The company's main office is in New York City with branch offices in Houston, London, and Hong Kong. In January 2015, the firm had $34.21 billion in assets under management and as of May 2017, the firm had $41 billion. By October 2026, AUM had increased to roughly $85 billion.

Two Sigma Investments also operates a market-making business, owns a Bermuda reinsurance company, and runs a venture capital arm.

== Wealth ==
In March 2017, Overdeck ranked 9th on Forbes' Highest-Earning Hedge Fund Managers.

As of March 2019, his net worth was $6.1 billion, making him one of the highest-earning hedge fund managers and traders by Forbes.

== Board memberships ==
Overdeck is acting chair of the National Museum of Mathematics, director of the Robin Hood Foundation, on the board of trustees of the Institute for Advanced Study, and a board member of the Hamilton Insurance Group.

== Personal life ==
On October 12, 2002, Overdeck married Laura Bilodeau, then a principal consultant for Stanford Research Institute; she went on to found Bedtime Math. They have three children and live in Millburn, New Jersey. Laura Overdeck initiated divorce proceedings in early 2022 citing “irreconcilable differences”. According to The Wall Street Journal, they do not have a prenuptial agreement. Laura Overdeck also sued over the family's lawyers moving various family assets into trusts in Wyoming, saying it appeared to be a way to hide assets from her and the children.

Overdeck competed in the 2019 National Museum of Mathematics's Masters Tournament, which raised almost $1 million, and placed third.

== Philanthropy ==
In 2011, Overdeck and his wife Laura established the Overdeck Family Foundation, an organization that funds educational research and STEM education. The foundation's overall goal is to enable all American children to unlock their potential by strengthening learning in and out of school.

The Overdecks' education philanthropy focuses on four key issue areas: "early impact", "exceptional educators", "innovative schools", and "inspired minds". They have made gifts to Robin Hood Foundation for work by MDRC to study the long-term effects of various early childhood programs. The Overdecks have also supported the Harlem Children's Zone within its early impact strategy and the Khan Academy. Other grantees have included the NJ STEM Teaching Fellowship, and Governor's School for the Sciences at Drew University in New Jersey. Laura Overdeck is an alumna of Governor's School and was instrumental in saving the program through private donations in 2006.

In October 2018, The Overdeck Education Innovation Fund gifted $1 million to be distributed over the next three years by the Woodrow Wilson School of Public and International Affairs for research on education issues. This is the second gift from the Overdeck Family Foundation, the first of which was $1 million donated in 2016. That same month, the Overdeck Family Foundation pledged $3 million to Opportunity Insights, a policy and research institute based at Harvard University that will publish data on the probability that children will escape poverty based on where they were raised.

== Honors and recognition ==
- 1986, Silver Medal for the U.S. in the International Mathematical Olympiad in Poland at age 16
- 2012, Distinguished Alumni of The Johns Hopkins Center for Talented Youth
- 2017, Golden Plate Award of the American Academy of Achievement
- 2019, Manager Lifetime Achievement Award at Institutional Investor's 17th annual Hedge Fund Industry Awards
