= Overdeck =

Overdeck is a surname. Notable people with the surname include:

- John Overdeck (born 1969), American hedge fund manager
- Laura Overdeck (fl. 2011), American education reformer, author and movie producer
