= Chain of Blame =

2008 book by Paul Muolo and Mathew Padilla

Chain of Blame: How Wall Street Caused the Mortgage and Credit Crisis
- Hardcover edition
- Author: Paul Muolo and Mathew Padilla
- Language: English
- Subject: Subprime mortgage crisis
- Genre: Non-fiction
- Publisher: John Wiley and Sons
- Publication date: 2008
- Publication place: United States
- Media type: Hardcover
- Pages: 328 pp.
- ISBN: 978-0470292778
- OCLC: 226355971
- Dewey Decimal: 332.7/20973 22
- LC Class: HG5095 .M86 2008

Chain of Blame: How Wall Street Caused the Mortgage and Credit Crisis is a 2008 book about the subprime mortgage crisis in the United States by investigative journalists Paul Muolo of National Mortgage News and Mathew Padilla of the Orange County Register. The book has an accompanying website with some excerpts, author biographies and a roundup of events in the subprime mortgage crisis that occurred after the book was printed.

== Overview ==
The book analyses the causes of the subprime mortgage crisis in the United States in an attempt to assign responsibility for the collapse of a number of mortgage companies in 2007–2008 and for the sharp rise in mortgage defaults in the wake of the sudden tightening of mortgage credit in the summer and early fall of 2007. The authors find that, while blame can be laid at every link of the mortgage production chain (borrowers, brokers, wholesale lenders) the ultimate culprits are Wall Street firms that carelessly securitized mortgage loan pools without appropriate diligence and attention to the quality of the underlying loans.

== Important personalities ==
- Angelo Mozilo, chairman of the board and chief executive officer of Countrywide Financial
- Roland Arnall, owner of ACC Capital Holdings
- Lewis Ranieri, former vice chairman of Salomon Brothers
- Michael Blum, managing director in charge of global asset-based finance at Merrill Lynch
- Bill Dallas, founder and CEO, Ownit Mortgage, a Merrill Lynch company
- Stanley O'Neal, former CEO Merrill Lynch
- Eric Billings, co-founder, chairman CEO, Friedman Billings Ramsey (FBR)
- Kerry Killinger, CEO Washington Mutual
- Ralph Cioffi, founder and senior portfolio manager Bear Stearns
- Alan Greenspan, former chairman, Federal Reserve
- Jack Mayesh, CEO, Long Beach Mortgage
- Brad Morrice, co-founder New Century Financial
- David Sambol, former president, Countrywide Financial Corp.
- James Johnson, chairman and CEO, Fannie Mae
- George Davies, loan trader Merrill Lynch

== Publishing information ==
- Muolo, Paul; Padilla, Matthew (2008). Chain of Blame: How Wall Street Caused the Mortgage and Credit Crisis. Hoboken, NJ: John Wiley and Sons. ISBN 978-0-470-29277-8.

== Japanese translation ==
In 2009 the book was published in Japanese by Nippon-Hyoron-Sha Co., Ltd. under the title サブプライム危機 : 実録. ISBN 978-4-535-55615-7.
