= Quill.org =

American educational website

- Formation: 2012; 14 years ago
- Founder: Peter Gault
- Type: 501(c)(3) non-profit
- Purpose: Education
- Headquarters: New York City, United States
- Board of directors: Stephanie Cohen (Cloudflare), Heejae Lim (TalkingPoints), Peter Norvig (Stanford), Matthew Rodriguez (Millennium Management), Tony Sebro (Change.org), Ben Sussman (Pomelo Care), Paul Walker (Goldman Sachs)
- Website: quill.org

Quill.org is an American nonprofit educational technology organization.

== History ==
The organization was cofounded by Peter Gault in 2012. Its approach was inspired by "The Writing Revolution", published in The Atlantic by Peg Tyre, which outlined a writing methodology based on sentence-level writing. It first received funding from the Bill & Melinda Gates Foundation in 2013. Under the name Empirical Resolution Inc., Quill.org received tax-exempt status in 2014. It was part of the 2015 cohort of tech nonprofits in Fast Forward, and also participated in accelerator programs with LearnLaunch and the Edwin Gould Foundation.

In 2018, Quill.org developed writing and assessment tools using artificial intelligence (AI) as part of the Google AI For Social Good Impact Challenge. It initially used predictive artificial intelligence, but later switched to generative artificial intelligence. In 2023, Quill.org and CommonLit launched AIWritingCheck.org, a tool for detecting AI-generated text in student essays.

== Products ==
Quill.org's aim is to support reading, writing, and critical thinking development in grades 3–12. Quill.org has a library of free online activities. Teachers, schools, or school districts must pay for advanced features like detailed student diagnostic reports. Its activities are aligned with the Common Core English standards and intended to supplement regular classroom instruction. Its learning tools incorporate AI-based coaching for students.

== Operations ==
Quill.org is designated a 501(c)(3). As of 2024, it had received grants of $2.2 million from the Overdeck Family Foundation, nearly $2 million from the Bill & Melinda Gates Foundation, $1.3 million from Google.org, and $750,000 from the Patrick McGovern Foundation. Quill.org reported revenues of $6.96 million and expenses of $5.2 million in 2024.

The executive director is co-founder Peter Gault. It is headquartered in New York City. Quill.org's Generative AI Playbook outlines its use of AI. Components include a Teacher Advisory Council, which reviews writing prompts, and a group of curriculum developers who evaluate student responses.

== Usage ==
Quill.org saw a significant surge in usage with the onset of the COVID-19 pandemic and the subsequent lockdowns in the United States, with over a million signups in six weeks. As of 2023, it was "one of the top four nonprofit literacy tools in the U.S", having served over 8 million students. A 2025 report by Project Evident stated that Quill serves 10% of schools in the US, including around 3 million students per year, and "providing 40 million hours of free tutoring to date."

== Research ==
In 2023, a randomized controlled trial conducted by the College Board concluded that secondary students using Quill Connect had improved scores on sentence combination compared to a control group. A 2025 study by Leanlab Education of more than 100,000 students found "meaningful improvements in sentence-level writing skills."

== Awards ==
- World's Most Innovative Companies, Fast Company, 2018
- Project Innovation winner, Comcast NBCUniversal Foundation, 2019
