= Ameriquest Mortgage =

American subprime mortgage lender

- Industry: Investment services
- Founded: 1979; 47 years ago, in Orange County, California, U.S.
- Founder: Roland Arnall
- Defunct: 2007
- Fate: Chapter 11 liquidation
- Successor: Citigroup
- Headquarters: Los Angeles, California United States
- Area served: United States
- Products: Subprime mortgage; Investment Banking
- Number of employees: 2,000 (2007)
- Website: Ameriquest Mortgage

Ameriquest was one of the largest United States sub-prime mortgage lenders until its dissolution in September 2007. Among the first mortgage companies employing computers to solicit prospective borrowers and hasten the loan application process, Ameriquest was accused of predatory lending practices by United States banking regulators. The company was notable for its promotion of the stated income loan, whereby potential borrowers were allowed to claim income without verification of employment. The proliferation of lending to customers with marginal creditworthiness proved to be not only a key factor leading to the subprime mortgage crisis, but also a catalyst to Ameriquest's own demise.

Ameriquest was widely known throughout the United States for its promotional activity. It advertised widely on television; flew blimps over football and baseball stadiums; and sponsored the Rolling Stones' A Bigger Bang tour, the Super Bowl XXXIX halftime show, and NASCAR drivers.

== History ==
Ameriquest was founded in 1979 by Roland Arnall, in Orange County, California, as a savings and loan association, or thrift, called Long Beach Savings & Loan. After moving to Long Beach, California and being converted to a pure mortgage lender in 1994, the company was renamed Long Beach Mortgage Co. In 1997, the department that funded loans made by independent brokers was spun off into a publicly traded company that was ultimately purchased by Washington Mutual in 1999.

Long Beach Savings & Loan was subsequently reorganized into three divisions under the auspices of ACC Capital Holdings, a private conglomerate owned entirely by Arnall: Ameriquest Mortgage Company (retail banking), Argent Mortgage (wholesale banking), and AMC Mortgage Services (loan servicing).

In 2004 alone, Ameriquest was estimated to have originated over $50 billion in new subprime mortgages.

On September 1, 2007, Citigroup completed its acquisition of Argent Mortgage and AMC Mortgage Services, shutting down Ameriquest Mortgage.

== Predatory lending allegation ==
In 1996, the company agreed to pay $3 million into an "educational fund" to settle a Justice Department lawsuit accusing it of gouging and predatory lending practices against older, female, and minority borrowers. Prosecutors accused it of allowing mortgage brokers and its own employees to charge these customers an additional fee of as much as 12 percent of the loan amount. As part of the settlement, Ameriquest agreed to use the educational fund to train its employees in proper mortgage techniques and to refrain from utilizing predatory lending techniques, but only within the State of California.

In 2001, after being investigated by the Federal Trade Commission, the company settled a dispute with ACORN, a national organization of community groups, promising to offer $360 million in low-cost loans.

In February 2005, reporters Michael Hudson and E. Scott Reckard broke a story in the Los Angeles Times about "boiler room" sales tactics at Ameriquest. Their investigation found evidence that the company had undertaken various questionable practices, including "deceiving borrowers about the terms of their loans, forging documents, falsifying appraisals and fabricating borrowers' income to qualify them for loans they couldn't afford."

On August 1, 2005, Ameriquest announced that it would set aside $325 million to settle investigations by 30 state attorneys general into allegations that it had preyed on borrowers by offering loans with hidden fees and balloon payments. In at least five of those states—California, Connecticut, Georgia, Massachusetts, and Florida—Ameriquest had already settled multimillion-dollar suits. Federal Housing Administration commissioner Brian Montgomery stated that the settlement reinforced his concern that the industry was exploiting borrowers and that he was "shocked to find those customers had been lured away by the 'fool's gold' of subprime loans".

On June 13, 2007, lawyers for borrowers seeking class status asserted in a filing with the District Court for the Northern District of Illinois that "assets of the Ameriquest entities were transferred to Arnall with the actual intent to hinder, delay, or defraud the plaintiffs in this action."

Former Ameriquest employees alleged that they were pushed to falsify documents on bad mortgages and then sell them to Wall Street banks looking to make fast profits. There is growing evidence that such mortgage fraud may have been at the heart of the 2008 financial crisis.

== See also ==
- United States housing bubble
- Mortgage industry of the United States
