= Beth Kobliner =

American journalist and author

- Born: January 18, 1965 (age 61)
- Education: Brown University (BA)
- Spouse: David E. Shaw (m. 1993)
- Children: 3

Beth Kobliner (born January 18, 1965) is an American personal finance commentator, journalist and author of the New York Times bestsellers Get a Financial Life: Personal Finance in Your Twenties and Thirties. and Make Your Kid a Money Genius (Even If You're Not). In 2010, she was appointed by President Obama to the President's Advisory Council on Financial Capability, and was instrumental in developing the council's Money as You Grow initiative. The site, MoneyAsYouGrow.org, has reached over one million visitors. In February 2014, Kobliner was appointed by President Obama to the President's Advisory Council on Financial Capability for Young Americans.

Kobliner is also the co-author, with her then nine-year-old son, of the 2013 children's book Jacob's Eye Patch, illustrated by Jules Feiffer.

Kobliner served as an advisor for Sesame Street's financial education initiative, and appeared in an outreach video with the character Elmo. She is a contributor to the Huffington Post and Mint.com, has participated regularly in public radio's national programs The Takeaway and Marketplace, on which she discussed teens and money with her daughter in the "Beth and Becca" segment. Kobliner has been a columnist at Glamour and Redbook magazines, and has contributed to publications including The New York Times, The Wall Street Journal, O: The OprahMagazine, Parade, and Reader's Digest. She was a featured correspondent and national outreach advisor for the PBS special Your Life, Your Money.

== Early life ==
Kobliner grew up in a Jewish family, the daughter of a New York high school principal and a high school chemistry teacher turned homemaker. Kobliner is a graduate of Brown University, where she studied literature. Following college, she worked for Sylvia Porter, a pioneer in the personal finance field, and later joined Money magazine as a staff writer. Through the Shaw Family Endowment Fund, she and her husband have donated $1 million to Organizing for Action, $400,000 to the Stephen Wise Free Synagogue, $400,000 to Memorial Sloan Kettering Cancer Center, $1 million to Yale University, $800,000 to the Horace Mann School, $1 million to Stanford University, and $1 million to Harvard University.

== Personal life ==
Kobliner married hedge fund manager and billionaire David E. Shaw in 1993. They are members of the Stephen Wise Free Synagogue in New York. They have two sons and a daughter, and live in New York City.
