= Michael Truell =

American entrepreneur

- Born: September 2000 (age 25–26)
- Education: Massachusetts Institute of Technology
- Occupations: CEO, Cursor
- Website: mntruell.com

Michael Truell is an American software engineer and entrepreneur. He is the co-founder and chief executive officer of Cursor, an AI coding agent company.

== Early life and education ==
Truell was born in New York City and studied at the Horace Mann School, where he met Aman Sanger, a future co-founder. During his early years, Truell developed an interest in programming and worked on improving reinforcement learning for simple robotic tasks. In 2016, he co-created the Halite AI Programming Competition, which served over 10,000 contestants across three seasons of competition. In 2017, he attended the Research Science Institute at MIT. Truell went on to earn a Bachelor of Science degree from MIT, majoring in computer science and mathematics. While at MIT, he did research on maximum likelihood estimation for Brownian motion tree models and worked at a biotech startup on computational chemistry.

== Career ==
In 2022, Truell co-founded Cursor with Sualeh Asif, Aman Sanger and Arvid Lunnemark, whom he met while studying at MIT. Cursor is an artificial intelligence-assisted coding environment used for software development tasks. In 2024, the company raised $60 million in a Series A funding round led by Andreessen Horowitz. In November 2025, Cursor raised $2.3 billion in a funding round co-led by Accel and Coatue, increasing its valuation to approximately $29.3 billion.

Cursor has been reported to generate over $1 billion in annualized revenue and is used by companies such as Nvidia, Adobe, Uber, and Shopify. In 2026, SpaceX entered into an agreement with Cursor that provided an option to acquire the company for $60 billion, or alternatively to pay $10 billion for access to its technology and collaboration. SpaceX ultimately acquired the company in June in an all-stock deal, the largest venture-backed startup acquisition in history.
