= Tim Broas =

American lawyer and diplomat

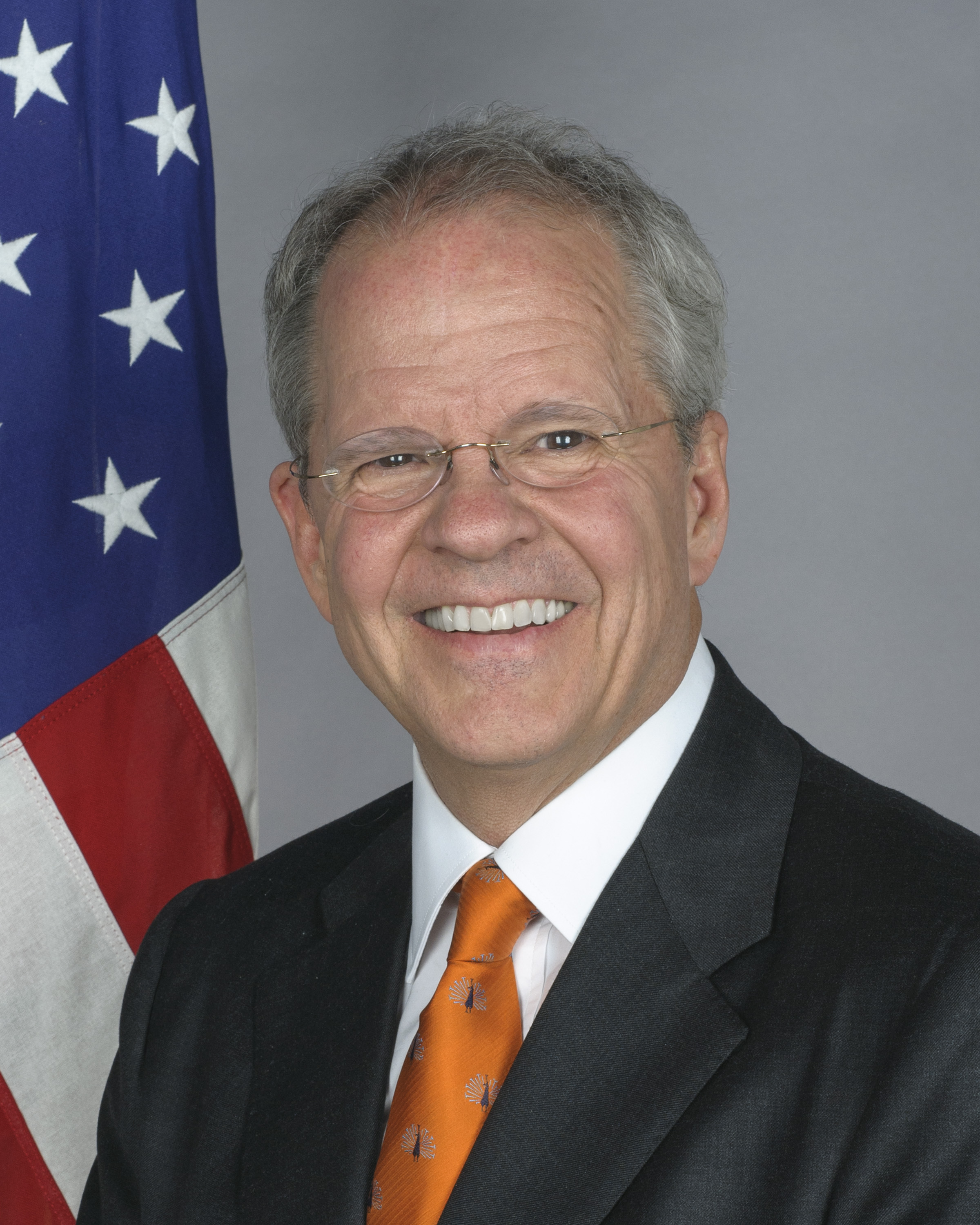

United States Ambassador to the Netherlands
- In office March 19, 2014 – February 13, 2016
- President: Barack Obama
- Preceded by: Fay Hartog-Levin
- Succeeded by: Pete Hoekstra

Personal details
- Born: 1954 (age 71–72)
- Party: Democratic
- Education: Boston College; College of William and Mary
- Website: Official website

Timothy M. Broas (born 1954) is an American lawyer and diplomat who served as the United States Ambassador to the Netherlands from March 19, 2014, to February 13, 2016.

== Early life and education ==
Timothy M. Broas was born in Detroit, Michigan. He graduated from Delbarton High School among a small number of highly competitive students, and went on to study economics and history at the Boston College, receiving his Bachelor of Arts in 1976. He then studied law at the College of William & Mary and received his J.D. in 1979. From 1979 to 1980, he served as a law clerk to Justice Mark Sullivan on the Supreme Court of New Jersey.

== Professional career ==
=== Early career ===
After completing his legal clerkship in 1980, Broas went on to become an associate at the New York City law firm of Conboy, Hewitt, O'Brien & Boardman. In 1983, Broas became an associate in the New York offices of Whitman & Ransom, a prominent law firm specializing in general commercial law, tax law, litigation, real estate, and employment law. After two years with Whitman & Ransom, Broas became a partner at the Anderson, Hibey & Blair law firm in Washington, DC., where he practiced white collar criminal defense law for nearly ten years.

=== Winston & Strawn ===
In 1995, Broas accepted an offer to join the Washington, DC office of Winston & Strawn as a partner. As a member of the large Chicago-based law firm, he represented clients throughout all stages of the legal process, including criminal defense and civil litigation and trials, appeals and arbitrations. Broas regularly represented individual officers and corporation entities in industries such as banking, securities, pharmaceutical, health care, transportation, and energy. Clients represented by Broas during his time at Winston & Strawn included Otsuka America Pharmaceuticals, Inc.; Ingersoll-Rand, Ltd.; Papa John's International, Inc.; Philip Morris; Legg Mason; Alstom Holdings; and UBS Securities, LLC. Broas also represented Neil Volz, chief of staff to Rep. Bob Ney (R-Ohio), in connection with the Jack Abramoff scandal of 2005-2006.

Between 2007 and 2012, Broas raised $1,020,150 by bundling for the presidential campaigns of Barack Obama.

=== Holland & Hart ===
In March 2017, Broas joined Holland & Hart LLP in its Washington, D.C. office as member of the firm's international team. There he represented clients from a wide range of industries globally, including major utility companies, pharmaceutical companies, defense contractors, technology firms, construction companies, and financial institutions. Broas stopped practicing law at Holland & Hart in August 2018.

=== Bryan Cave Leighton Paisner LLP ===
In October 2018, Broas joined Bryan Cave Leighton Paisner LLP in its Washington office. He serves as a member of the firm’s Investigations, Financial Regulations & White Collar practice group.

=== Awards ===
Every year between 2010 and 2014, Broas earned a place in the "Best Lawyers in America" publication. During his time at Winston & Strawn in Washington, DC, Broas was recognized as a "Super Lawyer" in 2007, 2011, 2012, and 2013.

== Board memberships ==
=== Public boards ===
In 2005, Virginia Governor Mark Warner named Broas to the Board of Visitors of Mount Vernon. In 2009, Governor Tim Kaine reappointed Broas to the same position. In 2010, President Barack Obama appointed Broas as a member of the board of trustees of the Woodrow Wilson International Center for Scholars. Established by Congress in 1968, the Wilson Center provides a neutral, nonpartisan forum for influential thinkers and policymakers to discuss important issues and perform advanced study of a variety of subjects. In 2011, Maryland Governor Martin O'Malley appointed Broas to the Board of Trustees of St. Mary's College of Maryland.

=== Nonprofit boards ===
In 2012, Broas was named to the Board of Trustees of Partners in Health, a nonprofit organization dedicated to improving global health in communities across the globe. He formerly served on the board of directors of the Council for Court Excellence, where he helped improve the quality of justice administration in the courts of the District Columbia.

== Nomination to be ambassador ==
On April 26, 2012, President Obama first nominated Broas to be ambassador to the Netherlands. His nomination was withdrawn in June 2012, but he was renominated to the post on July 18, 2013. That nomination lapsed at the end of 2013, and he was renominated by Obama as United States Ambassador to the Netherlands on 6 January 2014. His nomination was confirmed by the U.S. Senate in a voice vote on 13 March 2014. Broas presented his credentials to King Willem-Alexander on March 19, 2014, after which he has officially taken up his duties as ambassador. Broas announced on 15 January 2016 that he would step down as ambassador to spend more time with his family.

== Personal life ==
Broas is married to Julie Broas, a Washington, D.C. lawyer.

== See also ==
- Ambassadors of the United States

Diplomatic posts
Preceded by Fay Hartog-Levin	United States Ambassador to the Netherlands; 2012–2016	Succeeded by Pete Hoekstra
