= James B. Culbertson =

American diplomat (1938–2025)

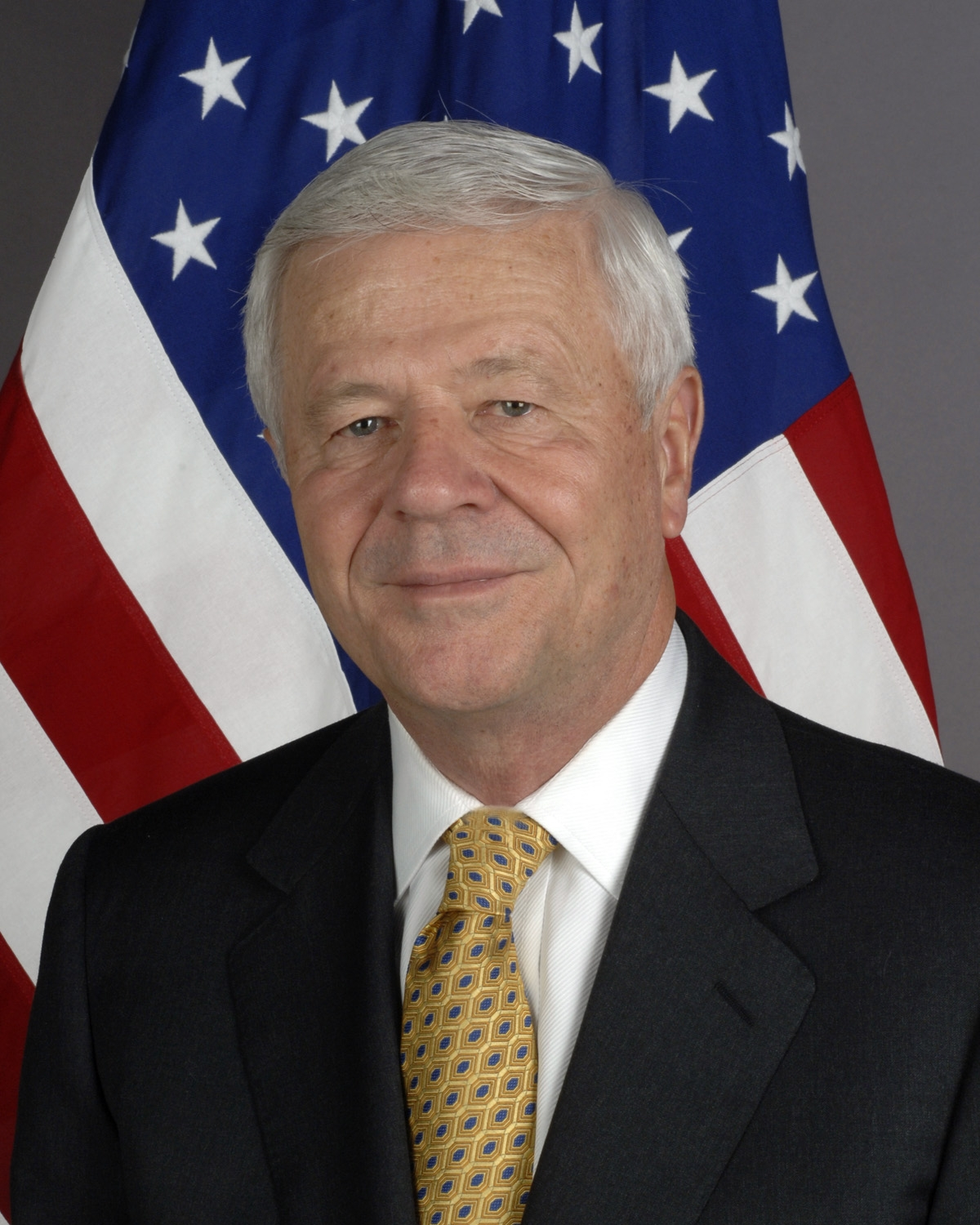
- Official portrait, 2008

United States Ambassador to the Netherlands
- In office July 10, 2008 – January 20, 2009
- President: George W. Bush
- Preceded by: Roland Arnall
- Succeeded by: Fay Hartog-Levin

Personal details
- Born: James Blair Culbertson; May 27, 1938 Goldsboro, North Carolina, U.S.
- Died: August 29, 2025 (aged 87)
- Children: 1
- Education: The Citadel
- Occupation: Diplomat, politician, businessman

Military service
- Allegiance: United States
- Branch/service: Army
- Years of service: 1960–1962
- Unit: Military Intelligence Corps

James Blair Culbertson (May 27, 1938 – August 29, 2025) was an American diplomat who served as the United States Ambassador to the Netherlands until 2009. Appointed by President George W. Bush, Culbertson was commissioned as ambassador on July 10, 2008. He presented his credentials to Queen Beatrix on August 13, 2008.

== Early life and education ==
Culbertson was born in Goldsboro, North Carolina, on May 27, 1938. In 1960, he graduated from The Citadel with a Bachelor of Arts degree in political science. After graduation he served as an Intelligence officer for the U.S. Army from 1960 to 1962.

== Private sector career ==
In 1974, he founded Financial Computing and was CEO, until his retirement in 2000. Culbertson was on the North Carolina Banking Commission from 1973 to 1979. He also was on the North Carolina Board of Economic Development from 1985 to 1993. From 1988 to 1993, Culbertson was a member of the National Federation of Independent Businessmen. Additionally, he was a member of The Fund for American Studies Board of Trustees, from 1988, as well as a member of the American Battle Monuments Commission, from 2005.

== Political career ==
Culbertson first visited the Netherlands in 1970, as a member of The American Council of Young Political Leaders, and was a board member from 1973 to 1979.

Culbertson was an active member of the Republican Party for many years, acting as a fundraiser in North Carolina. He was on a number of state and national committees. In 2000, Culbertson was the co-chairman for the North Carolina campaign for George W. Bush's presidency. In 2005, he was one of eight co-chairs for President Bush's inauguration.

== Personal life and death ==
Culbertson's family consisted of his wife, his daughter, and two grandsons. He died at home on August 29, 2025, at the age of 87.

== Sources ==
- Biography: James B. Culbertson; U.S. Department of State; Archive; August 13, 2008

Diplomatic posts
Preceded by Roland Arnall	64th United States Ambassador to the Netherlands; July 10, 2008 – January 20, 2009	Succeeded by Fay Hartog-Levin
