= Fay Hartog-Levin =

65th United States ambassador to the Netherlands

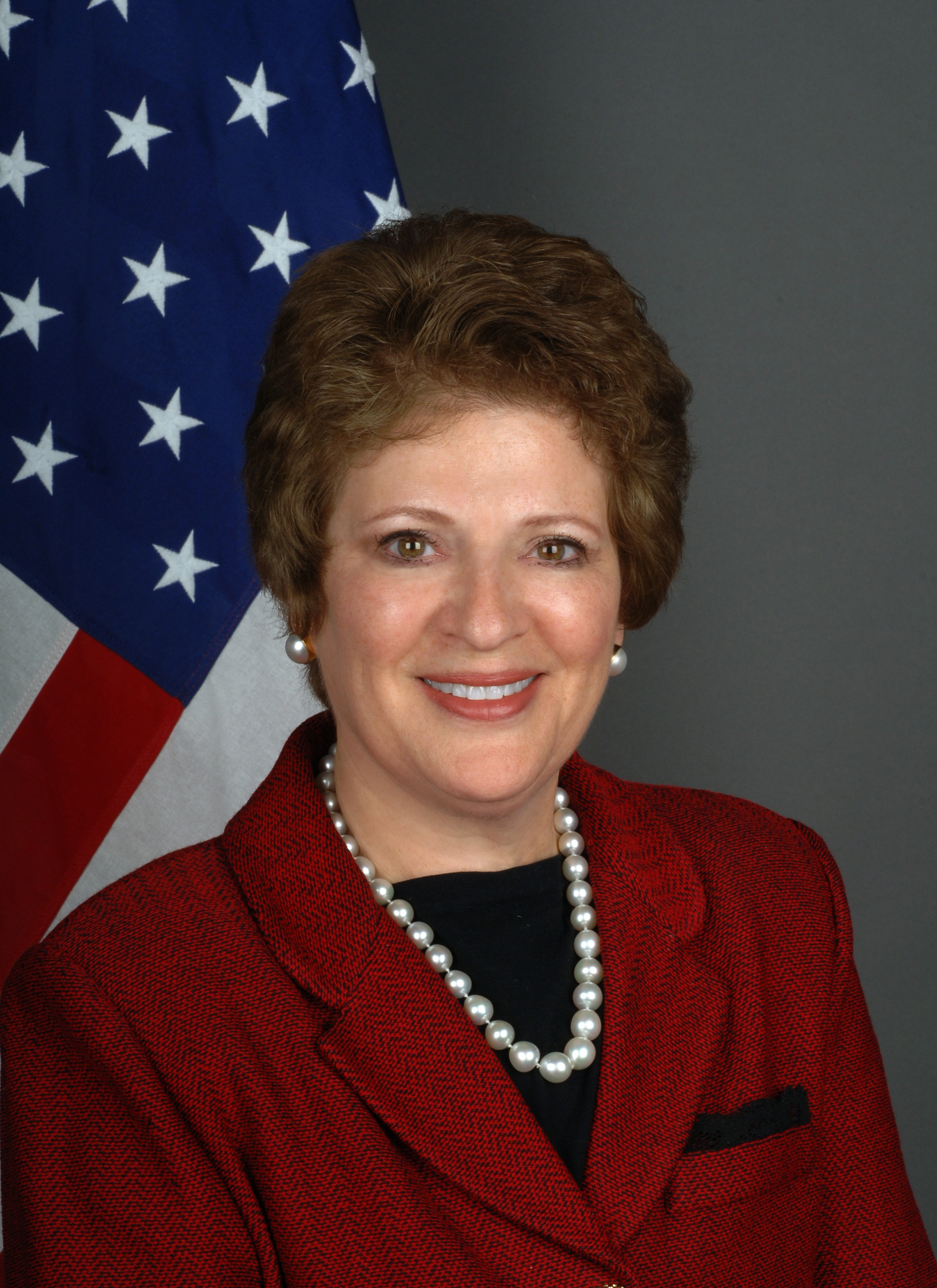

65th United States Ambassador to the Netherlands
- In office August 19, 2009 – September 1, 2011
- President: Barack Obama
- Preceded by: James Culbertson
- Succeeded by: Tim Broas

Personal details
- Born: Fay Hartog; 1948 (age 77–78) New York City, U.S.
- Spouse: Daniel Levin
- Children: 2
- Education: Northwestern University (Bachelor of Arts); Loyola University Chicago School of Law (Juris Doctor)
- Occupation: Lawyer; Consultant; Diplomat

Fay Hartog-Levin (born 1948) is an American lawyer, consultant, and diplomat. She is a former United States ambassador to the Netherlands, from 2009 to 2011.

== Early life and career ==
Fay Hartog was born in the United States. Her parents Ada and Jo Hartog were Dutch Jews that fled from the Netherlands to Suriname in 1942 and emigrated to the United States in 1948, shortly before she was born. She studied Russian language and literature at Northwestern University and law at Loyola University Chicago School of Law. For over twenty years, she worked as a lawyer. She was an attorney and executive of the Field Museum in Chicago and she was a consultant for the Res Publica Group. She is the widow of Daniel Levin who died on January 11, 2025. She lives in Winnetka and has two children. and eleven grandchildren.

In 2009, she succeeded James Culbertson and became the 65th United States ambassador to the Netherlands in The Hague. She presented her credentials to Queen Beatrix on August 19, 2009. She resigned her post in September 2011. On April 26, 2018, Ambassador Levin was inducted as an officer into the Order of Orange Nassau for her longstanding commitment to strengthening the bilateral relationship between the Netherlands and the United States as part of the King’s Day celebration. "Ambassador Fay Hartog-Levin is an American who is deeply rooted in her Dutch heritage. Her commitment to a strong bilateral relationship between the birthplace of her parents and her home is exemplary," said Ambassador Henne Schuwer. "She graciously gives her expertise, support and friendship to make the Netherlands and the United States better places, be it assisting in the visit of King Willem-Alexander and Queen Máxima to Chicago in 2015 or facilitating student exchange programs to the Netherlands, the Dutch have a great friend in Ambassador Hartog-Levin."

Diplomatic posts
Preceded by James Culbertson	65th United States ambassador to the Netherlands; August 19, 2009 – September 2011	Succeeded by Tim Broas
