= David Siegel (computer scientist) =

American computer scientist and entrepreneur (b. 1961)

- Born: 1961 (age 64–65); The Bronx, New York, US
- Education: Princeton University, MIT
- Occupation: Computer scientist
- Known for: Co-founder and co-chairman of Two Sigma

David Mark Siegel (born 1961) is an American computer scientist, entrepreneur, and philanthropist. He co-founded Two Sigma, where he currently serves as co-chairman. Siegel has written for Business Insider, The New York Times, Financial Times and similar publications on topics including machine learning, the future of work, and the impact of algorithms used by search and social media companies.

== Early life and education ==
Siegel was born in 1961 and spent his early childhood in the Bronx, New York and focused on computer science at a young age. By 12 years old, he had built memory and logic boards and learned to program a supercomputer at New York University's Courant Institute of Mathematical Sciences. As a freshman in high school, he taught a programming course to high school students at an NYU summer program.

After attending Mamaroneck High School, Siegel graduated from Princeton University with a degree in electrical engineering and computer science and he went on to receive a PhD in computer science from MIT. There, he conducted research at the Artificial Intelligence Laboratory and developed thermal and tactile sensors for the Utah-MIT dexterous four-fingered hand, as well as a computational architecture for controlling the system.

== Career ==
After leaving MIT, Siegel worked alongside Jeff Bezos at D.E. Shaw & Co and became the company's first Chief Information Officer. During this time he founded FarSight Financial Services, the first integrated personal financial services website. FarSight performed the first retail stock trade on the Internet and was acquired by Merrill Lynch. He later served as Chief Technology Officer and Managing Director at Tudor Investment Corporation. In 1999, Siegel founded Blink.com, a web-based browser bookmark storage, organization, and sharing service that automatically searched for new sites related to users' existing bookmarks. Blink was later sold to the Vendare Group.

=== Two Sigma ===
In 2001, Siegel co-founded Two Sigma, a New York City-based company that applies data science and technology to financial services. Siegel has stated that he believes investment managers that take a scientific approach to investing have a distinct advantage. As of 2019, Two Sigma managed $60B assets globally, and had offices in New York, Houston, London, Hong Kong and Shanghai.

Siegel has spoken about encouraging employees to branch out from their daily work at Two Sigma, taking on outside engineering challenges and coding competitions. In May 2019, a Two Sigma team competed in the inaugural New York City FIRST robotics corporate challenge after setting up a temporary robotics lab in its New York office.

Siegel supports employees contributing to the company's Data Clinic, which uses the pro bono model to connect Two Sigma data scientists on a project basis with the social sector. In a partnership with the Environmental Defense Fund, the Two Sigma Data Clinic data scientists used public data on inspections of oil and gas wells to develop predictive models that could be used to send inspectors to higher risk sites.

== Published views ==
Siegel writes and speaks frequently about the relationship between technology and society. He has called machine learning the "story of our times," and despite its limitations, such as a lack of common sense, has described it as "the best way anyone has come up with to algorithmically find knowledge in unstructured data."

Siegel has focused on the importance of separating misconceptions from reality when it comes to A.I. and algorithms. In 2019, he cautioned that A.I. and automation could lead to significant losses of certain middle-skill jobs, but could create new types of jobs for appropriately skilled workers.

He has also argued that algorithms such as those used by search and social media companies could harm society by "contributing to increasingly slanted and divided views about the issues of the day." Siegel has advocated for these companies to form a self-regulatory organization modeled after the Financial Industry Regulatory Authority. Siegel has suggested that if society is going to trust machines with life or death situations, it must "insist on new, tougher standards for their software."

Siegel has also spoken about his concern that we “may not be building a world that is meant for humans” and has been focused on how the COVID-19 pandemic has accelerated society's dependence on technology and automation, negatively impacting the human experience.

He also argued in 2018 that America needs a consistent and thought-out plan for investing in and maintaining infrastructure rather than periodically and haphazardly investing in it.

== Philanthropy ==
=== Siegel Family Endowment ===
In 2011, he founded the Siegel Family Endowment, which supports organizations that help prepare society for the impact of technology. The endowment funds organizations including the Center on Rural Innovation - which brings digital job training, computer science education and entrepreneurship centers to rural areas — and Data and Society – a research institute that examines the social issues that can arise from pervasive technology.

In 2017, Siegel Family Endowment made a total of 50 grants to organizations including the New York Hall of Science, Mozilla Science Lab, and Jobs for the Future. In 2019, Siegel Family Endowment made commitments to CSforALL, and the Constellations Center for Equity in Computing and the Aspen Institute.

Siegel Family Endowment makes mission-driven grants in three interest area portfolios:

- Learning: Supports research and programs that investigate how learning and teaching need to change in order to equip the greatest number of people with adaptable, future-relevant competencies and skills.
- Workforce: Supports organizations that use technological innovations to help more people pursue meaningful work in a rapidly changing economy.
- Infrastructure: Supports organizations that explore the implications of rapid digital innovation for the institutions that underpin civil society.

=== Scratch Foundation ===
In 2014, Siegel co-founded the Scratch Foundation to ensure that Scratch, a free online coding community that helps children learn to think creatively, reason systematically, and work collaboratively, remains free and accessible to kids all over the world. As of October 2018, the organization's official website showed more than 40 million projects shared. He is Vice Chairman of the Scratch Foundation.

== Board membership ==
He is a member of the MIT Corporation, where he sits on the Executive Committee, and serves on MIT's Visiting Committee for the Media Lab, Electrical Engineering and Computer Science, and Center for Brains, Minds, and Machines, as well as with the advisory group for the Task Force on the Work of the Future. He is Founding Chair of the advisory board for MIT Quest, an initiative that seeks to discover the foundations of human intelligence.

He is Chairman of the Board of Overseers at Cornell Tech. He also serves on the Advisory Board for Stanford's Center on Philanthropy and Civil Society, a research center for students, scholars and practitioners to share ideas that create social change, and the Advisory Council for Princeton's Center on Information Technology Policy, which brings together expertise in technology, engineering, public policy and the social sciences.

He co-founded the New York City FIRST Robotics organization to elevate STEM education and robotics programs and is a member of the national FIRST Robotics board. Siegel serves on the global advisory board of Khan Academy, whose mission is to provide a free world-class education for anyone, anywhere.

He sits on the Board of Trustees of the Robin Hood Foundation's Learning + Tech Fund, founded to use technology to transform learning for low-income students in New York City. He serves on the Board of Trustees for Carnegie Hall.

As a board member of the for-profit Hamilton Insurance Group, he has served as Chairman of the Compensation and Personnel Committee.

== Awards and honors ==
In 2016, Siegel received the FIRST organization's John C. Whitehead Leadership Award in honor of his service and support for the science and technology education charity's New York chapter.

In 2017, Siegel received the Golden Plate Award by the Academy of Achievement for his pioneering work in technology and investment management. The same year, Siegel was named to "The Bloomberg 50: The People Who Defined Global Business in 2017."

Siegel received Institutional Investor's Lifetime Achievement Award in 2019.

== Personal life ==
Siegel is married and lives in Scarsdale, New York.
