= Arvid Lunnemark =

Swedish mathematician and entrepreneur

- Born: 1999 (age 26–27); Malmö, Sweden
- Education: Massachusetts Institute of Technology
- Occupations: Mathematician, programmer, entrepreneur
- Known for: Co-founding Cursor

Arvid Lunnemark is a Swedish mathematician, programmer, and entrepreneur. He is a co-founder of AI-assisted code editor Cursor. Before co-founding Anysphere, he represented Sweden in international mathematics and programming competitions, including the International Mathematical Olympiad and the International Olympiad in Informatics.

== Early life and education ==
Lunnemark is from Malmö, Sweden. He attended school in Sweden before moving to the United States for university studies. He later studied at the Massachusetts Institute of Technology (MIT), where he met the future co-founders of Anysphere.

== Mathematics and programming competitions ==
As a student, Lunnemark competed in mathematics and informatics olympiads for Sweden. In 2018, he won a gold medal at the International Mathematical Olympiad. He also represented Sweden at the International Olympiad in Informatics, where he won a silver medal in 2017.

== Career ==
In 2022, Lunnemark co-founded Anysphere with Michael Truell, Sualeh Asif, and Aman Sanger, all of whom had studied at MIT. The company developed Cursor, an AI-assisted code editor.

In October 2025, Lunnemark left Cursor. According to The Hindu, he stated that he intended to focus on artificial intelligence safety and research work outside the company.

In June 2026, several publications reported that SpaceX was in talks to acquire Anysphere in a stock deal valued at about US$60 billion.

== Personal life ==
Lunnemark has been described in press coverage as Swedish and based in the United States during his work at Anysphere.

== See also ==
- Anysphere
- Cursor (code editor)
- International Mathematical Olympiad
- International Olympiad in Informatics
