= Laura Overdeck =

American math education entrepreneur

- Born: Laura Anne Bilodeau
- Education: Princeton University (BS); University of Pennsylvania (MBA)
- Political party: Republican
- Spouse: John Overdeck (m. 2002; sep. 2022)
- Children: 3

Laura Overdeck (née Bilodeau) is an American education reformer, author and movie producer. Overdeck is the founder and president of the Bedtime Math Foundation, a nonprofit that helps parents teach their kids math in fun, recreational ways through a free app. She also authored a book series entitled Bedtime Math published by MacMillan. Overdeck is the producer of the movie Rule Breakers, the story of the first all-girls robotics team in Afghanistan. In her role on the New Jersey Pandemic Relief Fund, she launched the New Jersey Tutoring Corps to address learning loss during the COVID pandemic. The Tutoring Corps continues to function today as a standalone nonprofit operating statewide at 80 sites.

== Early life ==
Overdeck is the daughter of Emily and Gilbert R. Bilodeau of Westfield, New Jersey. She graduated from Westfield High School in 1987, where she was valedictorian of her class. She was also selected for and participated in the New Jersey Governor's School in the Sciences. Overdeck went on to earn a bachelor's degree in astrophysical sciences from Princeton University. She also holds a master's degree in business administration from the Wharton School, and an honorary doctorate in engineering from Stevens Institute of Technology.

== Career ==
After completing her education, Overdeck held positions at D.E. Shaw & Co. and at Stanford Research Institute.

Overdeck founded the nonprofit Bedtime Math in 2012, sending out playful nightly math posts for children to solve with their parents. The blog received early critical acclaim, and the following year she published Bedtime Math: A Fun Excuse to Stay Up Late, her first of four books with Feiwel & Friends, an imprint of Macmillan Children's Publishing Group. In 2021, she received Mathical Honors for Bedtime Math: This Time It’s Personal. Subsequently, the Bedtime Math team created an app version of the offering; University of Chicago researchers found that app usage increased children's math skills by an extra three months in one school year, publishing the results in Science. Overdeck has published opinion pieces on children's math education in TIME Magazine, Huffington Post, USA Today, the Houston Chronicle, and Quartz.

Overdeck is a trustee at Princeton University and vice chair of the board of trustees at the Liberty Science Center in New Jersey. She also is on the advisory boards of the Johns Hopkins Center for Talented Youth and Khan Academy.

=== Awards ===
Overdeck was named Educator of the Year by the New Jersey R & D Council in 2017. In 2019 she was the commencement speaker at Stevens Institute of Technology, where she also received an honorary doctorate.

== Philanthropy ==
In 2011, Overdeck and her husband established the Overdeck Family Foundation, an organization that funds educational research and STEM education. The foundation's overall goal is to enable all American children to unlock their potential by strengthening learning in and out of school.

The Overdecks’ education philanthropy focuses on four key issue areas: “early impact,” “exceptional educators,” “innovative schools,” and “inspired minds.” They have made gifts to Robin Hood Foundation for work by MDRC to study the long-term effects of various early childhood programs. The Overdecks have also supported the Harlem Children's Zone with its early impact strategy and the Khan Academy. Other grantees have included the NJ STEM Teaching Fellowship, and Governor's School for the Sciences at Drew University in New Jersey. Overdeck is an alumna of Governor's School and was instrumental in saving the program through private donations in 2006.

In October 2018, The Overdeck Education Innovation Fund gifted $1 million to be distributed over the next three years by the Woodrow Wilson School of Public and International Affairs for research on education issues. This is the second gift from the Overdeck Family Foundation, the first of which was $1 million donated in 2016. That same month, the Overdeck Family Foundation pledged $3 million to Opportunity Insights, a policy and research institute based at Harvard University that will publish data on the probability that children will escape poverty based on where they were raised.

In early 2024, Overdeck co-founded Wake Up Call NJ with former deputy commissioner of the New Jersey Department of Education, Peter Shulman.

== Personal life ==
On October 12, 2002, Overdeck married John Overdeck, co-founder of Two Sigma Investments. They live in Millburn, New Jersey, and have three children. They started divorce proceedings in early 2022.
