= Two Sigma =

American hedge fund management firm

Two Sigma Investments, LP

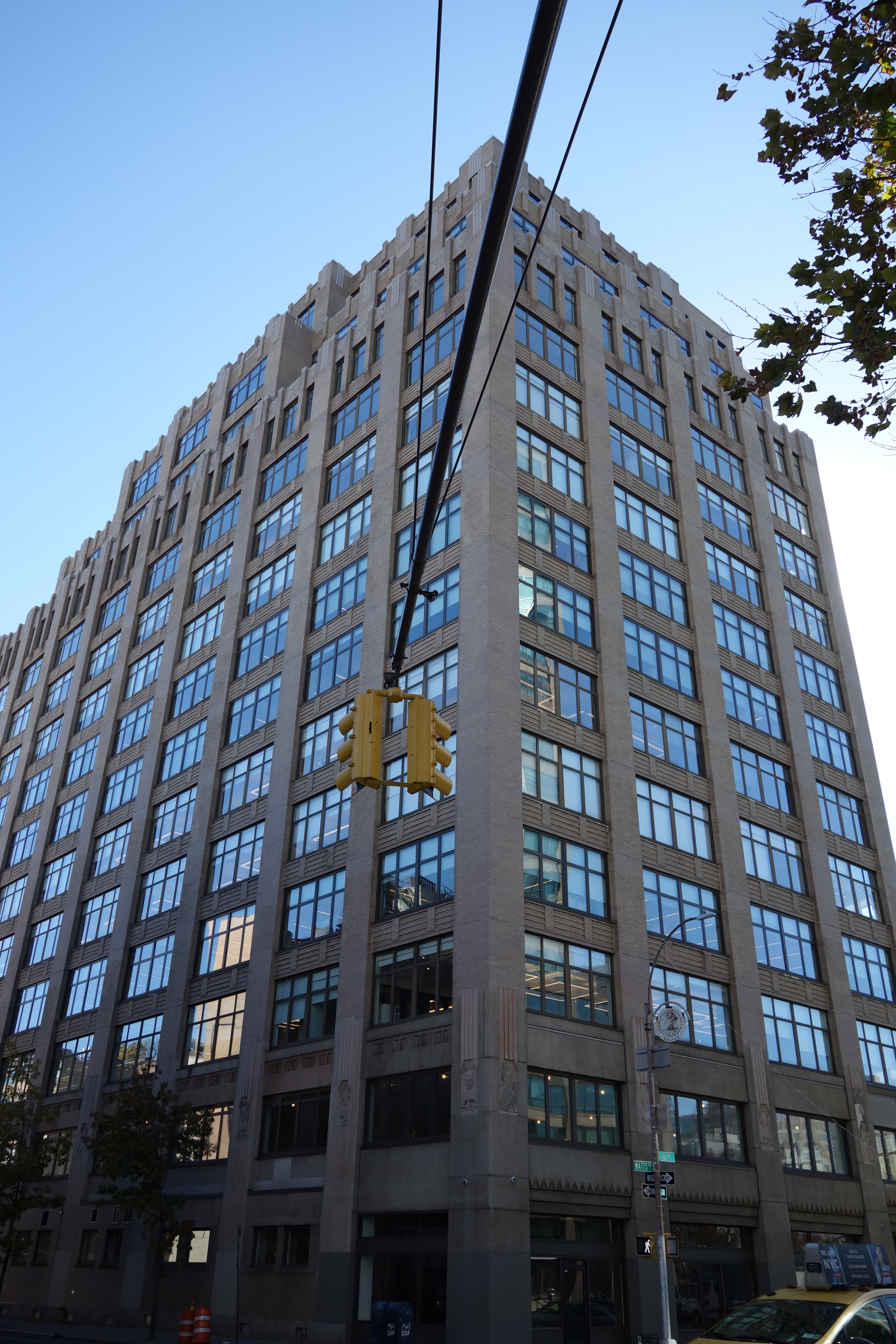
- Headquarters at 100 Avenue of the Americas
- Type: Private
- Industry: Hedge fund
- Founded: 2001; 25 years ago
- Founders: John Overdeck; David Siegel; Mark Pickard
- Headquarters: 100 Avenue of the Americas, New York City, U.S.
- Products: Hedge fund, Quantitative investment management, Securities trading
- AUM: US$80 billion (2026)
- Number of employees: c. 2,000 (2026)
- Website: twosigma.com

Two Sigma Investments, LP is an American hedge fund headquartered in New York City. It uses a variety of technological methods, including artificial intelligence, machine learning, and distributed computing, for its trading strategies. The firm was run by John Overdeck and David Siegel until August 2024.

== History ==
Two Sigma Investments was founded in 2001 by John Overdeck, David Siegel and Mark Pickard. Siegel is a computer science Ph.D. from the Massachusetts Institute of Technology who worked for Tudor Investments, and Overdeck is an International Mathematical Olympiad Silver Medalist who subsequently studied mathematics at Stanford University and worked for Jeff Bezos in Amazon.com's early days. The two met at D. E. Shaw & Co., where Siegel held the position of Chief Information Officer and Overdeck the position of managing director. They left to co-found Two Sigma in 2001 with seed funding from Paul Tudor Jones. Pickard served as the President of the firm from its inception until his retirement in 2006.

According to Two Sigma, the firm's name was chosen to reflect the duality of the word sigma. A lower case sigma, σ, designates the volatility of an investment's return over a given benchmark, and an upper case sigma, Σ, denotes sum. By adding together the volatilities of individual positions measured against the benchmark, Two Sigma can amplify forecast signals, the company's website says.

In February 2014, Forbes reported that former Two Sigma employee Kang Gao, aged 29, was prosecuted by the District Attorney of New York County and is accused of using a remote-access device to view Two Sigma's proprietary trading models and emailing this information to his personal email account, lifting quantitative trading strategies, trading models, a marketing presentation, and a scientific white paper. The case, New York. v. Kang Gao, led to Gao receiving 8 months in jail as of October 2014. In February 2015, Gao pleaded guilty to "illegally accessing and duplicating proprietary and confidential information related to the firm's trading methods."

In 2016, Two Sigma Investments ranked 11th on Penta's Top 100 Hedge Funds.

As of early 2017, Two Sigma had used crowdsourcing options to find trading signals. By March 2017, the fund was running a competition on Kaggle to code a trading algorithm.

The fund managed around $8 billion in November 2011, $23 billion in October 2014, and $32 billion by the end of 2015. As of October 2017, the fund had assets reaching more than $50 billion. In May 2019, the fund had assets reaching $60 billion. This number slightly dropped to $58 billion in October 2020, after Two Sigma saw losses in its risk premia, absolute return, and macro funds.

In January 2026, Two Sigma sold Venn, its quantitative investment analytics tool, to Insight Partners for an undisclosed amount.

Two Sigma has become the second largest global asset manager in China. In May 2026, Two Sigma’s China macro strategies were affected by increased market volatility, with the firm’s main macro fund posting consecutive monthly losses following a sharp drawdown in March amid global geopolitical and commodity market disruptions. Separately, in May 2026, Two Sigma Ventures was spun out into an independent venture capital firm, Deviation Capital, which assumed management of approximately $2 billion in assets under management previously overseen by the venture arm. The Juliang strategy, which has been the bulk of Two Sigma’s China assets, returned 14.2% annually since inception through April 30.

In June 2026, Blackstone announced it would provide backing for a new Asia-focused quantitative hedge fund founded by former Two Sigma managing director Jinger Zhao.

=== Overdeck and Siegel ===
In March 2023, the firm took the rare step of discussing personnel discord in the corporate suite in a filing to investors. It seems that relations between co-founders John Overdeck and David Siegel collapsed over the course of the previous years, and they were no longer on speaking terms; yet both continued to own a large segment of the company with no sign of being willing to sell their stake. The relationship was so contentious that the firm stopped holding all-hands meetings, due to the pair's unwillingness to coordinate and address employees or investors together. Additionally, Overdeck was in the process of a messy and public divorce, with his wife accusing him of hiding the family's assets in a court filing. In August 2024, Overdeck and Siegel stepped down as co-chief executives and were replaced by Carter Lyons and Scott Hoffman.

=== SEC investigation ===
In October 2023, The Wall Street Journal reported that a senior vice president had made unauthorized changes to Two Sigma's trading models, leading to different-than-expected investment results, prompting the U.S. Securities and Exchange Commission to open an investigation. Two Sigma remediated its clients who were subscribed to specific funds that suffered losses. In September 2025, the Department of Justice indicted a former Two Sigma quantitative researcher, Jian Wu, on fraud charges for allegedly manipulating the firm's algorithmic trading models, resulting in $165 million in damage to clients. Two Sigma terminated Wu in 2024 and repaid the client losses. The SEC also filed a civil suit against Wu for related allegations.

== Technology ==
At the end of 2016, Two Sigma Investments introduced an artificial intelligence challenge called Halite. Halite is a programming game inviting coding enthusiasts to build smart bots whose goal is to gain control of a virtual grid. Due to the success of Halite I, Two Sigma decided to develop a second season of Halite called Halite II. This ran from October 2017 to January 2018, and in this version players competed for control of planets using ships. In October 2022, Two Sigma became a Chainlink node operator to help expand the use cases of blockchain-based hybrid smart contracts.

== Corporate Affairs ==
Founders John Overdeck and David Siegel remain co-chairmen.

Two Sigma has been noted in the business press for its unusually high rate of return, comparable to its older and more mature competitors D. E. Shaw & Co. and Renaissance Technologies. In October 2014, Two Sigma had raised $3.3 billion for a macro hedge fund in one of the largest new pools of such capital raised since the 2008 financial crisis.

There are a few specialized divisions which focus on private investments, venture capital investments (with a focus on companies operating in the realm of data science), advising institutional clients, and running a high frequency broker-dealer.
