= Aman Sanger =

American entrepreneur

- Born: New York, U.S.
- Education: Massachusetts Institute of Technology (BS)
- Occupation: Entrepreneur
- Years active: 2022–present
- Known for: Co-founding Anysphere, developer of Cursor
- Title: Chief Operating Officer, Anysphere
- Website: www.amansanger.com

Aman Sanger is an American entrepreneur and software executive. He is a co-founder of Anysphere, the company behind Cursor, an artificial intelligence-assisted code editor. He co-founded the company in 2022 with Michael Truell, Sualeh Asif and Arvid Lunnemark, whom he met while studying at the Massachusetts Institute of Technology.

== Early life and education ==
Sanger was born in New York and is the son of Indian immigrants. He began coding at age 14. He attended the Massachusetts Institute of Technology (MIT), where he studied computer science and mathematics from 2018 to 2022. While at MIT, he met Michael Truell, Sualeh Asif and Arvid Lunnemark, with whom he later co-founded Anysphere.

Before starting Anysphere, Sanger interned at Google and Bridgewater Associates, and also ran an artificial intelligence consultancy.

== Career ==
=== Research work ===
Before co-founding Anysphere, Sanger was involved in research work in computational biology and machine learning. He was a co-author of a 2021 paper published in Nature Methods on Tangram, a deep-learning framework for spatially resolved single-cell transcriptomics.

=== Anysphere and Cursor ===
In 2022, Sanger co-founded Anysphere with Michael Truell, Sualeh Asif and Arvid Lunnemark. The founders initially worked on other software ideas before developing Cursor, an AI-assisted code editor aimed at software developers. Cursor launched in 2023 and became one of the fastest-growing companies in the market for AI coding tools.

Sanger serves as chief operating officer of Anysphere. Coverage of Cursor has described him as part of the leadership team that helped scale the business as the product gained adoption among software engineers and enterprise customers. In November 2025, Anysphere announced a funding round valuing the company at $29.3 billion. In 2026, the company drew wider media attention amid reports that SpaceX had agreed to acquire Anysphere in a deal valuing it at $60 billion.

Sanger was also listed as a co-author on the Composer 2 Technical Report, a 2026 paper released by Cursor Research on a model for software engineering tasks.

== Wealth ==
Following Anysphere's November 2025 funding round, Forbes estimated that Sanger had become a billionaire based on his ownership stake in the company. In 2026, following the reported SpaceX acquisition, several outlets described his net worth as having increased substantially, with NDTV Profit reporting an estimate of $5.5 billion.
