= Cursor (company) =

American software company

Anysphere, Inc.
- Trade name: Cursor
- Type: Private (subsidiary)
- Industry: Artificial intelligence · developer tools
- Founded: 2022
- Founders: Michael Truell · Sualeh Asif · Aman Sanger · Arvid Lunnemark
- Headquarters: 33 New Montgomery Street, San Francisco, California, U.S.
- Key people: Michael Truell (CEO); Sualeh Asif (CPO); Jordan Topoleski (COO)
- Products: Cursor; Graphite; Cursor Composer
- Revenue: ▲US$3 billion ARR (May 2026)
- Number of employees: ~300 (2025)
- Parent: SpaceXAI
- Website: anysphere.inc

Anysphere, Inc., doing business as Cursor, is a subsidiary of SpaceXAI which offers generative AI for producing computer code. Its primary product is Cursor, an AI coding agent and software development environment.

Founded in 2022, the company builds AI tools for writing code via natural-language instructions. Cursor achieved a US$29.3 billion valuation and surpassed $3 billion in annual recurring revenue by early 2026. It was acquired and integrated into SpaceXAI from June 2026. In August, it became a wholly owned subsidiary of SpaceXAI.

== History ==
The company was incorporated in 2022 by Michael Truell, Sualeh Asif, Arvid Lunnemark and Aman Sanger while they were students at Massachusetts Institute of Technology (MIT). In October 2023 the startup announced an $8 million seed round led by the OpenAI Startup Fund, with angels including former GitHub CEO Nat Friedman and Dropbox co-founder Arash Ferdowsi. The company is headquartered at 33 New Montgomery Street, San Francisco.

In November 2024 TechCrunch reported that Benchmark, Index Ventures and others were bidding up Cursor's valuation to about $2.5 billion, four months after a $60 million Series A that had valued the company at $400 million.

In March 2025 the company was reported to be negotiating a round that would value it near $10 billion. On June 5, 2025, Cursor confirmed a $900 million Series C led by Thrive Capital, lifting its post-money valuation to $9.9 billion.

Cursor crossed $100 million in annual recurring revenue (ARR) in January 2025 and topped $500 million ARR by June 2025.

Cursor

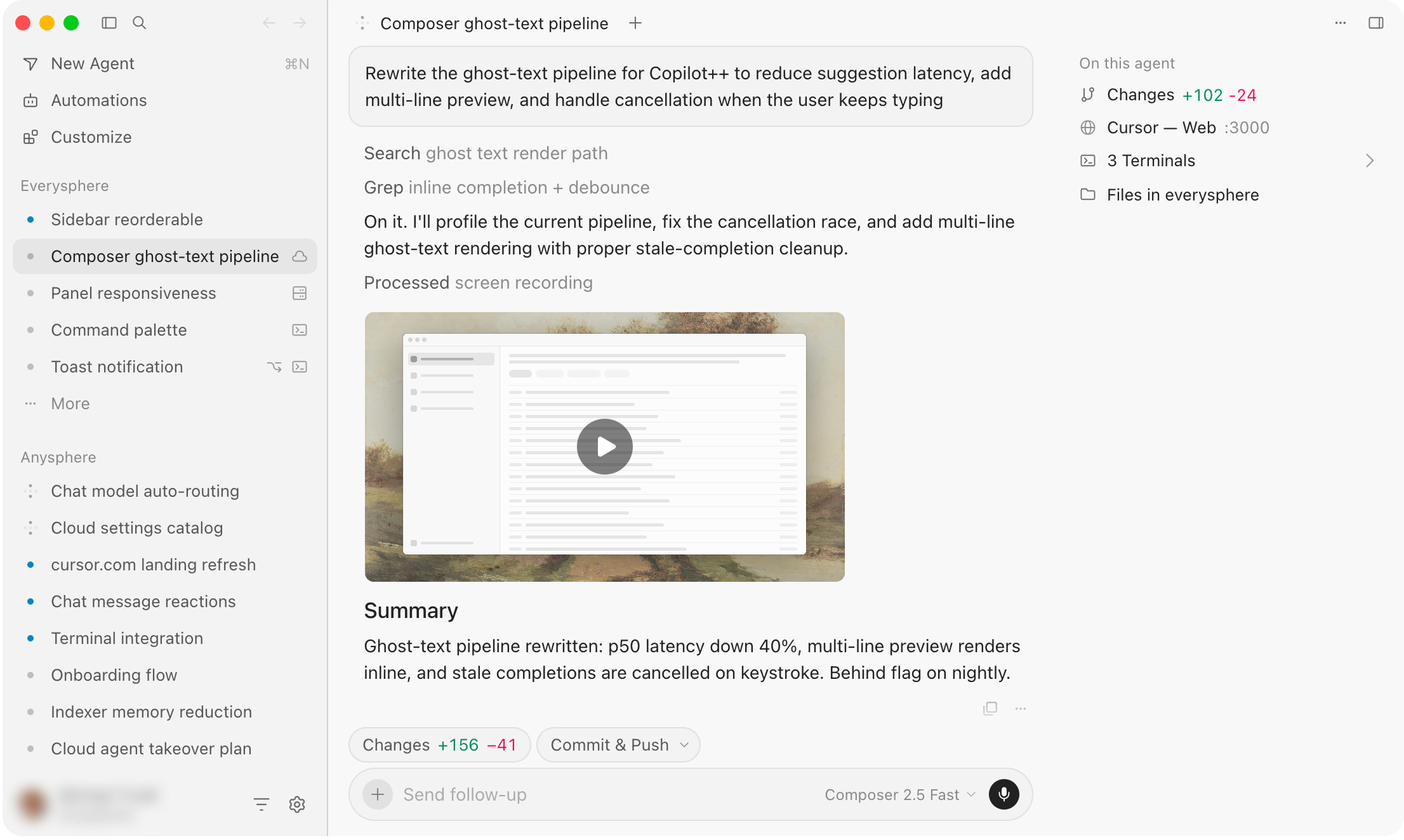
- Screenshot Screenshot of the Cursor app
- Developer: Cursor
- Operating system: Linux; Microsoft Windows; macOS; iOS; iPadOS
- Type: AI-assisted software development
- Website: cursor.com

In April 2025, an AI help-desk program named "Sam" invented a non-existent login policy, triggering user cancellations before staff intervened and issued refunds.

In October 2025, co-founder Arvid Lunnemark left the company to found a safety-focused AI research lab, Integrous Research.

On November 13, 2025, Cursor closed a $2.3 billion Series D funding round co-led by Accel and Coatue Management, valuing the company at $29.3 billion. The round included participation from strategic partners Google and Nvidia. Following this round, the company reported its annualized revenue had exceeded $1 billion.

In April 2025, Cursor was featured in the Forbes AI 50 list.

In early 2026, Bloomberg and The Information reported that Cursor was in discussions to raise approximately $5 billion at a valuation of between $50 billion and $60 billion.

On April 21, 2026, SpaceX announced that it had struck a deal with Cursor giving it the right to acquire the company for $60 billion later that year, or to pay $10 billion for joint work. On June 16, SpaceX announced that it was exercising the purchase right in an all-stock deal to buy Cursor's parent company, Anysphere, expected to close in the third quarter of 2026.

The acquisition closed on August 14, 2026. Under the merger agreement, outstanding Anysphere common and preferred shares were converted into an aggregate of 389,289,254 shares of SpaceX Class A common stock (implied equity value $60 billion, based on the volume-weighted average closing price of SpaceX Class A shares over the seven trading days preceding closing). Vested restricted stock units converted into additional SpaceX shares; unvested RSUs and options were assumed and converted into SpaceX equity awards. Cursor survived as a wholly owned subsidiary of SpaceX and is being integrated into the SpaceXAI team.

== Products ==
=== Cursor ===
Cursor's main product is Cursor, an AI coding agent and software development environment. Its agent features can search across a codebase, edit files, run terminal commands, and carry out multi-step programming tasks from natural-language instructions.

In October 2025, Cursor released Cursor 2.0, which added support for running multiple agents in parallel using git worktrees or remote machines.

Cursor has also released agents for web, mobile, command-line, and cloud environments.

A July 2025 change to Cursor's $20 Pro plan, switching from 500 requests to a usage-metered cap, provoked complaints about unexpected charges; the firm rolled back limits and promised refunds.

=== Bugbot ===
In July 2025, Cursor launched Bugbot, a code-review tool integrated with GitHub pull requests. Cursor also offers team and enterprise plans with administrative controls, usage analytics, single sign-on, model controls, and compliance features.

== Models ==
Cursor offers access to large language models including Grok, Claude, and Google DeepMind.

Cursor's Composer 2 model, released in March 2026, was built on top of Kimi 2.5, a January 2026 open weights LLM by Chinese startup Moonshot AI. This detail was not disclosed until a revelation by users on X in the first week of its release. Cursor vice-president Lee Robinson then acknowledged this, and claimed "Only ~1/4 of the compute spent on the final model came from the base, the rest is from our training". Co-founder Aman Sanger acknowledged "a miss to not mention the Kimi base in our blog from the start". Moonshot congratulated Cursor, noting Cursor's "authorized commercial partnership" with Fireworks AI. TechCrunch speculated Cursor did not publicize its model's origin due to tensions with the AI industry in China, sometimes called an AI arms race.

== Acquisitions ==
In November 2024, Cursor acquired Supermaven, an AI code-completion startup founded by Jacob Jackson, for an undisclosed sum. The Supermaven team was folded into Cursor, and Supermaven's standalone product was wound down in late 2025.

In July 2025, Cursor acquired top engineering talent from Koala, an AI-powered customer relationship management startup, to staff a new enterprise-readiness team; Cursor did not adopt Koala's CRM product, and Koala subsequently shut down. Around the same time, Cursor hired Travis McPeak, co-founder and CEO of cybersecurity startup Resourcely, to lead its security team.

In December 2025, Cursor agreed to acquire Graphite, a New York-based code-review startup, in a cash-and-equity deal reported to be well above Graphite's most recent $290 million valuation.

== Business ==
Cursor prohibits the use of AI tools during the first round of coding interviews and invites finalists for a two-day on-site project with the core team. As of August 2025, the company employed roughly 300 people.

== Controversies ==
In April 2025, an AI help-desk agent named "Sam" invented a non-existent login policy, prompting user cancellations before staff apologized and issued refunds. A July 2025 change to Cursor's Pro plan pricing drew complaints about unexpected charges; the company apologized, rolled back limits, and said it would refund affected users.

== See also ==
- Generative artificial intelligence
- List of AI-assisted software development tools
- List of artificial intelligence companies
- SpaceXAI
- Visual Studio Code
