= David E. Shaw =

American investor

David Shaw
- Born: March 29, 1951 (age 75)
- Education: University of California, San Diego (B.A.); Stanford University (MSc, PhD)
- Occupations: Investor, computational biochemist, and former hedge fund manager
- Known for: Founding and managing D. E. Shaw & Co.
- Spouse: Beth Kobliner (m. 1993)
- Children: 3
- Website: deshaw.com

David Elliot Shaw (born March 29, 1951) is an American billionaire, scientist, and founder of hedge fund D. E. Shaw & Co.. A former assistant professor in the computer science department at Columbia University, Shaw earned his fortune exploiting inefficiencies in financial markets with the help of early Internet networks and quantitative trading strategies. In 2001, Shaw turned to full-time scientific research in biochemistry, focusing on the molecular dynamics of proteins, using computer simulations.

== Early life ==
Shaw was raised in Los Angeles, California. His father was a theoretical physicist who specialised in plasma and fluid flows, and his mother was an artist and educator. They divorced when he was 12 years of age. His stepfather, Irving Pfeffer, was a professor of finance at the University of California, Los Angeles, and the author of papers supporting the efficient market hypothesis.

Shaw earned a bachelor's degree summa cum laude from the University of California, San Diego, double majoring in mathematics & applied physics and information science. He went on to earn a MSc, then a PhD from Stanford University in 1980, and founded Stanford Systems Corporation. He was appointed an assistant professor in the department of computer science at Columbia University. While at Columbia, Shaw conducted research in massively parallel computing with the NON-VON supercomputer (Non von Neumann). This supercomputer was composed of processing elements in a tree structure meant to be used for fast relational database searches.

== Career ==
=== Investment career ===
In 1986, Shaw joined Morgan Stanley, as Vice President for Technology in Nunzio Tartaglia's automated proprietary trading group. In 1988, he started his own hedge fund, D. E. Shaw & Co, which used proprietary algorithms for securities trading. According to Institutional Investor's Alpha magazine's annual ranking for 2014, Shaw made $530 million that year and was among the top 25 earners in the hedge fund industry. In 2018, Forbes estimated his net worth at $6.2 billion.

=== Academic career ===
Shaw is a senior research fellow at the Center for Computational Biology and Bioinformatics at Columbia University, and an adjunct professor of biomedical informatics at Columbia's medical school.

Shaw is founder and chief scientist of D. E. Shaw Research, which conducts interdisciplinary research in the field of computational biochemistry.

== Political activity ==
Shaw has donated US$2.25 million to Priorities USA Action, a super PAC supporting Democratic presidential candidate Hillary Clinton in 2016 and $1 million to Organizing for Action.

== Contributions to Educational Institutions ==
Through the Shaw Family Endowment, Shaw and his wife have donated over $37.3 million to various educational institutions including the Horace Mann School, Yale University, Stanford University, Harvard University, Princeton University, Columbia University, and Brown University. Publications such as ProPublica and The Daily Mail UK speculated that Shaw's donations may have been intended as a means of ensuring that each of his three children were granted admission to one or more of the recipient elite universities for their college educations. Shaw's donations were referred to by New York Magazine as "The Shaw Family Admissions Plan." Two of his children were accepted for admission to Yale.

== Personal life ==
Shaw married personal finance columnist Beth Kobliner in 1993. They have homes in New York City and have also resided in a $75 million "manse" in Westchester County since 2012. Shaw purchased multiple homes and combined them for his "sprawling compound" in Westchester County, New York; the environmental impact and disruption to local villagers due to the enormity and opulence of the mansion was such that it received press attention from the Columbia Journalism Review and The New York Times.

Their daughter is Rebecca Shaw, a Yale psychology major and alumna; she was briefly a writer for The Tonight Show Starring Jimmy Fallon and co-created the FX one-season series Adults with her husband Ben Kronengold. Their older son is Adam Shaw, a U.S. Treasury Department intern and Time writer.

== Honors ==
In 1994, Shaw was appointed by then-President Bill Clinton to the President's Council of Advisors on Science and Technology, where he was chairman of the Panel on Educational Technology. In 2000, he was elected to the board of directors of the American Association for the Advancement of Science and served as its treasurer from 2000–2010. In 2007, Shaw was elected as a fellow of the American Academy of Arts and Sciences. In 2009, he was appointed by President Obama to the President's Council of Advisors on Science and Technology. In 2012, he was elected to the National Academy of Engineering and in 2014 was elected to the National Academy of Sciences.

== See also ==
- List of computer scientists
- Computational chemistry
