= Roland E. Arnall =

American businessman and diplomat (1939–2008)

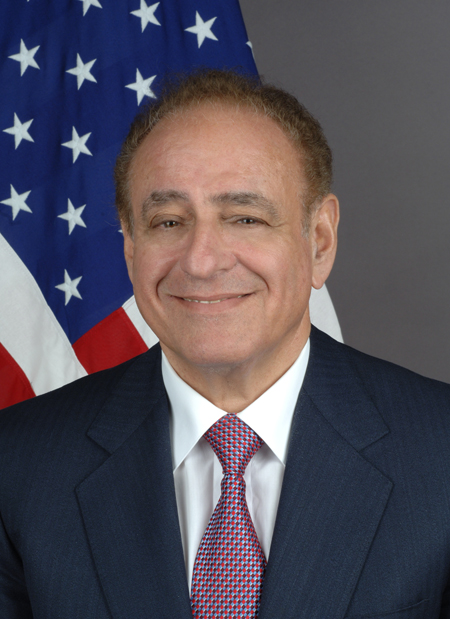

United States Ambassador to the Netherlands
- In office March 8, 2006 – March 7, 2008
- President: George W. Bush
- Preceded by: Clifford Sobel
- Succeeded by: James Culbertson

Personal details
- Born: March 29, 1939 Paris, France
- Died: March 17, 2008 (aged 68) Los Angeles, California, U.S.
- Spouse(s): Dawn L. Arnall (m. 2000-2008; his death); Sally Arnall (m. 1961-1998; divorced)
- Children: 2

Roland E. Arnall (March 29, 1939 – March 17, 2008) was an American businessman and diplomat. As the owner of ACC Capital Holdings, he became a billionaire with Ameriquest Mortgage. Additionally he funded, financed and was the visionary and co-founder of the Simon Wiesenthal Center, and from 2006 until shortly before his death he was the United States Ambassador to the Netherlands. He was the originator of stated income loans, better known as sub-prime loans.

== Early life ==
Roland Arnall was born on March 29, 1939, in Paris, France. His parents were Eastern European Jews who had fled to Paris. During World War II, Arnall was raised as a Roman Catholic in a French village. He was kept unaware of being a Jew until after the war had ended, when he was six years old.

After the war, Arnall and his family moved to Montreal, Canada. In the late 1950s they relocated to the United States, and for a while Arnall sold flowers on the streets of Los Angeles, California.

== Ameriquest ==
Arnall was the billionaire owner of ACC Capital Holdings, the parent company of Ameriquest, which became one of the United States's largest sub-prime mortgage lenders. By the end of 2005 two of Arnall's companies, Ameriquest and Argent, had funded almost $75 billion in subprime loans. A major factor of this development was Arnall's origination of the stated income loan, meaning loans were given without verification of income. In early 2006, the company announced a $325 million settlement with state attorneys general and law enforcement agencies and financial regulators in 49 states and the District of Columbia who had accused Ameriquest of misrepresenting and failing to disclose loan terms, charging excessive loan origination fees and inflating appraisals to qualify borrowers for loans.

In 2007 Arnall got out of the mortgage business by selling out to Citigroup, and others, for an undisclosed amount.

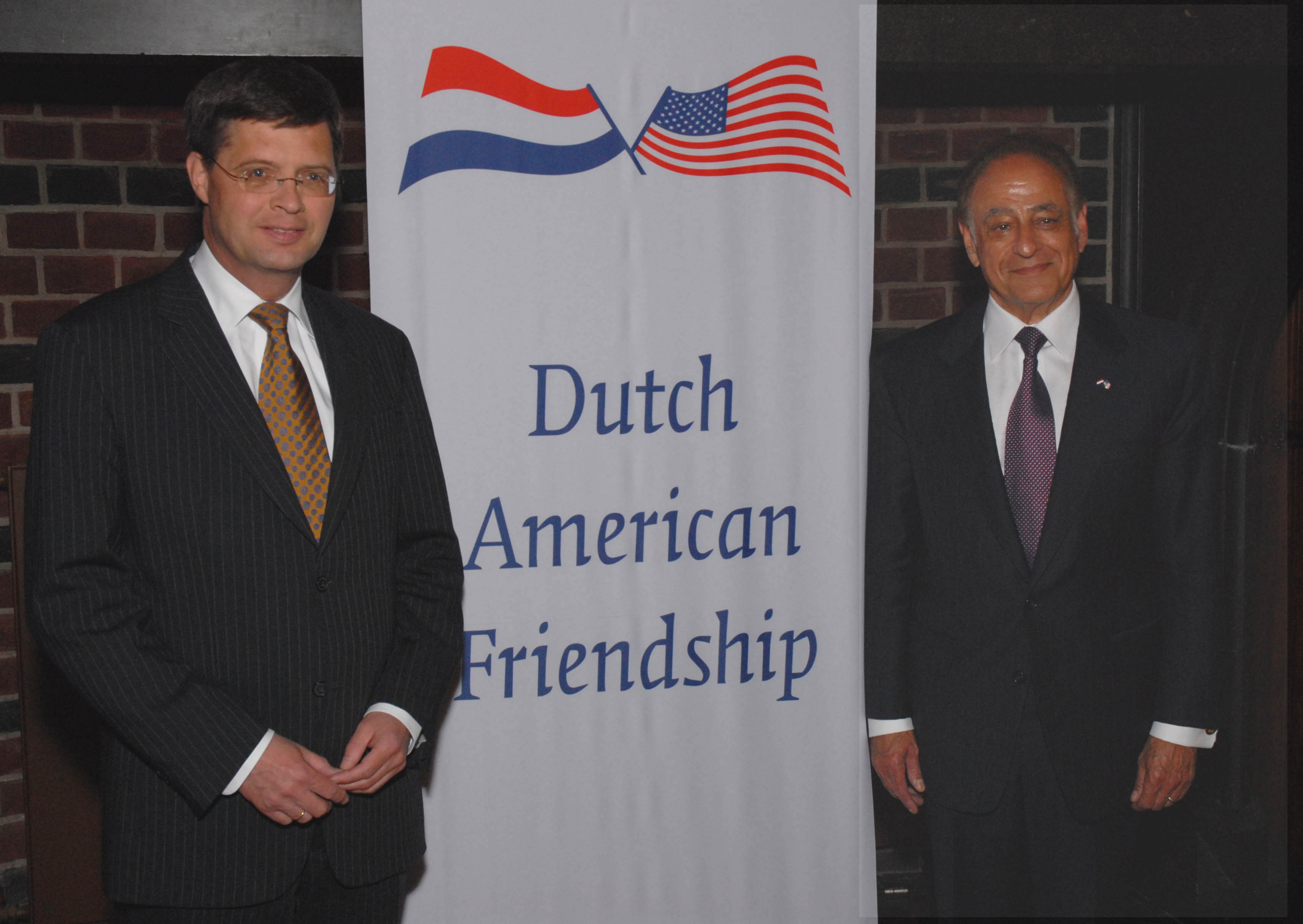
Arnall (right) with former Dutch Prime Minister Jan Peter Balkenende

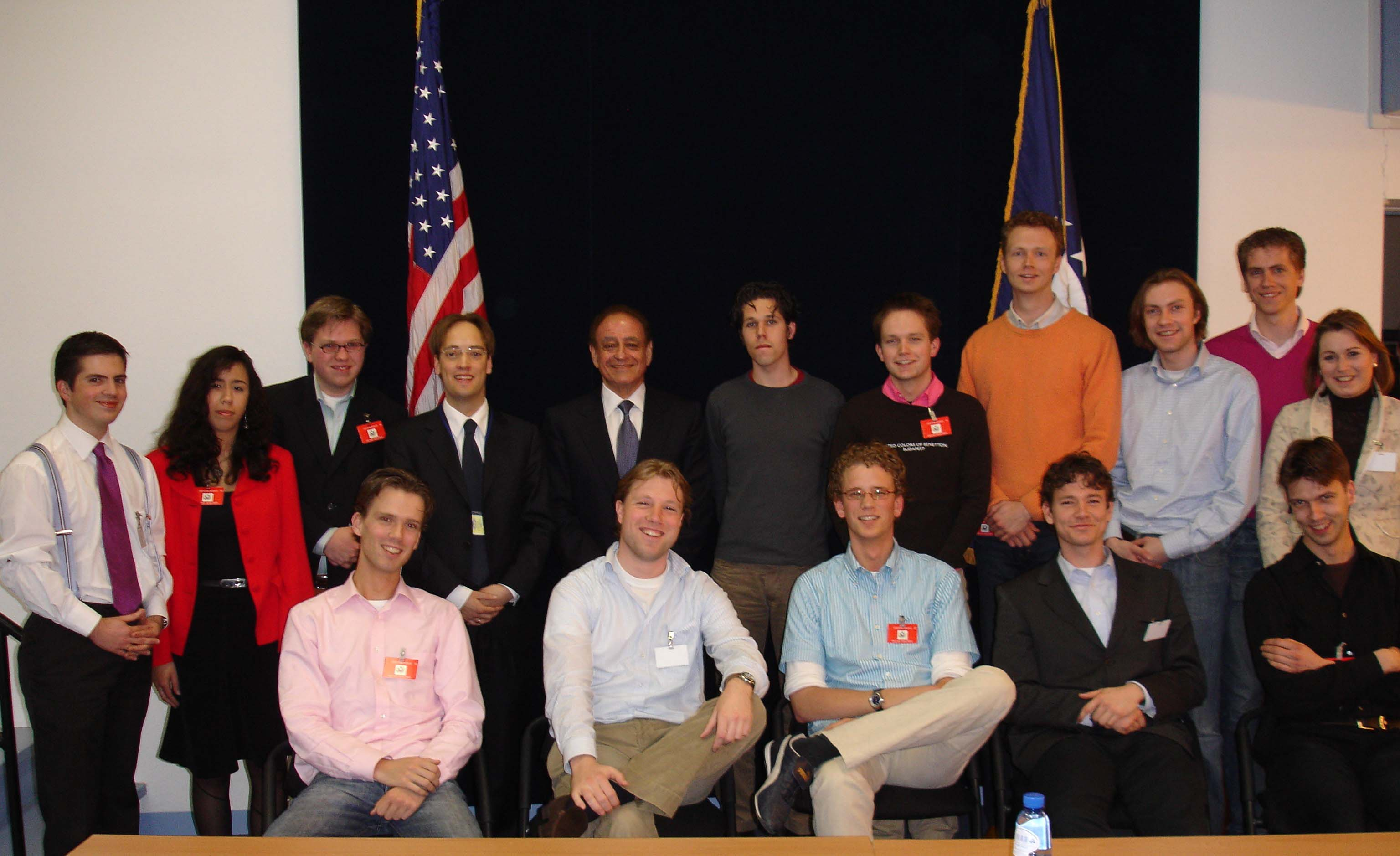
Ambassador Arnall meets with the Youth Organisation Freedom and Democracy

== Political activities ==
In the 2003–05 period, Arnall and his wife raised more than $12 million for George W. Bush's political efforts, including $5 million for the Progress for America Voter Fund, a self-proclaimed "conservative issue advocacy organization dedicated to keeping the issue record straight." Arnall was quoted as saying his support for Bush stemmed for his stance on Israel. In 2004 he was one of the top 10 donors to the Republican Party.

Mrs. Arnall also served as a co-chair for the 2004 Republican Convention and hosted a $1 million Bush-Cheney fundraiser at the couple's 10-acre (40,000 m^{2}) home in Holmby Hills. In 2005, Ameriquest Capital and three of its subsidiaries comprised four of the 53 entities that each contributed the maximum of $250,000 to the second inauguration of President George W. Bush. Writes USA Today, "Inaugural fundraisers Dawn and Roland Arnall found a creative way to pump more than the $250,000 limit into the event. Their mortgage firm, Ameriquest Capital, contributed the maximum, as did three subsidiaries, for a total of $1 million. The company declined to comment on its political giving."

== Diplomatic career ==
On August 1, 2005, President George W Bush nominated Arnall to become the U.S. ambassador to the Netherlands. The Senate approved his nomination on February 9, 2006. Arnall was installed as ambassador on March 8, 2006, when Queen Beatrix of the Netherlands received Arnall's letters of credence.

Arnall announced his resignation as ambassador on February 21, 2008, effective on March 7, citing the ill health of his son. He died ten days later.

== Personal life ==
Arnall had two children with his first wife Sally, from whom he divorced in 1998 after a 37-year marriage. According to FOX Business, Arnall died of cancer on March 17, 2008 at the UCLA Medical Center in Los Angeles, twelve days shy of his 69th birthday.

SHMAIS.com (Lubavitch News Website) reported that Chabad of California, a Jewish nonprofit group, was to be the beneficiary of an $18 million donation from the estate of Roland Arnall. According to their source, before his death, he made arrangements for Rabbi Shlomo Cunin to receive the donation, and a short while later sent in a down payment of $180,000. Arnall made three payments of $180,000 each to Chabad before dying; after his death, Chabad sought payment for what it said was the balance of his pledge. Arnall's widow, Dawn Arnall, denied that the payments made by her late husband had been part of a pledge. On January 25, 2013, a California appeals court affirmed a lower court's ruling, denying the claim from Chabad of California Inc. the amount it said was promised to it by Arnall.

== Links ==
- Ameriquest Mortgage Illegal Purchase of Consumer Credit Reports for Target Marketing and Privacy Law Violations
- Meet the biggest predatory lender in Cleveland -- America's new ambassador to the Netherlands., Cleveland Scene magazine.
- Forbes Magazine top 400 entry for Roland Arnall
- Los Angeles Times: Roland Arnall, 68; founder of subprime specialist Ameriquest
- Workers Say Lender Ran 'Boiler Rooms' , Los Angeles Times, February 4, 2005
- Embassy Biography

Diplomatic posts
Preceded by Clifford Sobel	63rd United States Ambassador to the Netherlands; March 8, 2006 – March 7, 2008	Succeeded by James Culbertson
