= ACC Capital Holdings =

Former mortgage lending business

- Type: Private
- Industry: Financial services
- Founded: 1995
- Founder: Roland Arnall
- Defunct: 2007
- Fate: Assets sold to Citigroup
- Headquarters: Orange, California, U.S.
- Area served: United States
- Key people: Roland Arnall (Founder and owner)
- Products: Mortgage lending
- Parent: Argent Mortgage; AMC Mortgage Services

ACC Capital Holdings (ACCCH) was a national mortgage lender based in Orange, California. The company is the largest privately held retail mortgage lender in the United States and the largest subprime lender by volume. ACCCH was founded by Roland Arnall.

As well as Ameriquest Mortgage, the company also owned Argent Mortgage which made wholesale loans through mortgage brokers, and AMC Mortgage Services which carried out customer services activities for all ACCCH mortgages. Ameriquest closed in 2007, and the rest of the company was acquired by Citigroup.

== Company reorganization ==
In early 2006, Ameriquest Mortgage settled a class action lawsuit for US$325 million with the attorneys general of 49 of the 50 states over allegations of predatory lending practices. Allegations included usury and bait-and-switch tactics.

On May 2, 2006, ACC Capital Holdings announced the closure of all of its Ameriquest Mortgage branch offices as part of a plan to consolidate its retail mortgage lending operations into four regional call centers. Thousands of employees were fired via conference call. The employees were given five minutes to get their personal belongings and leave the office. Ameriquest would soon be joined by other American mortgage companies in announcing massive layoffs.

On February 28, 2007, ACC Capital Holdings announced that Citi was providing working capital and access to credit. Citi also gained the option to purchase Argent and AMC, but this option did not extend to Ameriquest.

On September 9, 2007, Argent Mortgage was sold to Citi for an undisclosed amount. Argent was renamed Citi Residential Lending. Citi Residential Lending operated for several months before it was shut down.

On September 10, 2007, Ameriquest stopped accepting loan applications.

Former employees from Ameriquest, which was the United States' leading wholesale lender, described a system in which they were pushed to falsify documents on bad Ameriquest Mortgages and then sell them to Wall Street banks eager to make fast profits. Such mortgage fraud may have been the cause of the 2008 financial crisis.

== Sponsorships ==
From 2004 to 2007, Ameriquest owned the naming rights to the home stadium of the Texas Rangers baseball team. During this time the park was called Ameriquest Field. In March 2007, in an undisclosed agreement between the two entities, Ameriquest relinquished those rights, and the stadium was renamed Rangers Ballpark in Arlington, just one word off from the ballpark's original name.

Also in 2004, Argent commenced a sponsorship deal with IndyCar driver Danica Patrick, but it did not follow her when she switched to Andretti-Green Racing for the 2007 season.

In 2006, Ameriquest sponsored the "Ameriquest Dream Team" in the NASCAR Busch Series. Drivers Mark Martin (#6), Greg Biffle (#16), Matt Kenseth (#17), and Carl Edwards (#60) all drove Ameriquest racecars throughout the season. The next year, Ameriquest transferred this sponsorship to NEXTEL Cup, sponsoring Biffle in the #16 car for most of the schedule. However, due to the continuing problems with the subprime loan industry, Ameriquest has announced that it will not sponsor the #16 past the 2007 season, and, judging by the end of the naming rights deal for the baseball park (see below), this deal could be terminated earlier.

== Political donations ==
In 2005, Ameriquest Capital and three of its subsidiaries comprised four of the 53 entities that each contributed the maximum of $250,000 to the second inauguration of President George W. Bush. Writes USA Today, "Inaugural fundraisers Dawn and Roland Arnall found a creative way to pump more than the $250,000 limit into the event. Their mortgage firm, Ameriquest Capital, contributed the maximum, as did three subsidiaries, for a total of $1 million. The company declined to comment on its political giving."

Arnall's contributions to Republican Bush were a change of heart, and the result of Arnall's support for Bush's middle east policies post 9/11. Previously, Arnall was a long-time Democratic Party supporter and fundraiser. His wedding to Dawn Arnall was officiated by Democratic California Governor Gray Davis. Arnall was also an ardent supporter and fundraiser for Los Angeles Mayor Democrat Antonio Villaraigosa.

== See also ==
- Subprime mortgage crisis
- United States housing bubble
