= Bedtime Math =

American education organization

- Type: Non-governmental, non-profit organization
- Purpose: Educational
- Location: Summit, New Jersey, U.S.
- Official language: English
- Founder and president: Laura Overdeck
- Chief operating officer and director of research: Sara Thom
- Chief communications officer: Sandy LoPiccolo
- Chief strategy officer: Diana Pecina
- Website: bedtimemath.org

Bedtime Math is a non-profit organization focused on mathematics education for young children, launched by Laura Overdeck in February 2012.

== History ==
Bedtime Math was founded in February 2012, initially as a website. In March 2014, Bedtime Math launched Crazy 8s, a free nationwide after-school recreational math club.

== Products ==
Bedtime Math's main offering is daily math problems for elementary school-age kids, posted daily on the website's homepage.

- Apps: The organization delivers the same daily riddles via a free mobile application for Android and iPhone OS.
- Books: Laura Overdeck has also published four children's books; her book royalties are donated toward Bedtime Math's programming.
  - Bedtime Math: A Fun Excuse to Stay Up Late (Macmillan Children's Publishing Group, June 2013)
  - Bedtime Math: This Time It's Personal (Macmillan Children's Publishing Group, March 2014)
  - Bedtime Math: The Truth Comes Out (Macmillan Children's Publishing Group, March 2015)
  - How Many Guinea Pigs Can Fit on a Plane? (Macmillan Children's Publishing Group, June 2016)
- Crazy 8s: The free program provides a kit of materials to help host eight sessions of a weekly math club. As of 2019, there were 10,000 schools and libraries across the country that had participated.
- For Math Awareness Month in April 2013, Bedtime Math produced four short math comedies.

== Reception ==
Bedtime Math has been featured in The New York Times parenting blog, USA Today, and National Public Radio (NPR); its books have been featured on NPR's Science Friday and reviewed in The Wall Street Journal. Time described it as "heartening news for educators who bemoan the state of science, technology, engineering and math (STEM) education in the U.S."

In 2015, an article in the journal Science reported on a randomized trial on the use of the Bedtime Math iPad that the "app provide limited support for the effectiveness of the intervention" with "no significant improvement in math performance for the experimental group compared with the control group". In 2018, the Journal of Experimental Psychology: General and University of Chicago psychologists claimed that the app "has long-lasting effects even after children stop using the app".

In 2018, researchers at Johns Hopkins University released the results of a study that claimed that the students who took part in Crazy 8s reduced their math anxiety, with the art club students not experiencing a significant reduction in math anxiety. The effect was more pronounced among students in the kindergarten through second grade club.

It was named one of the best online learning math apps for kids by The New York Times, and one of the Outstanding Apps in Early STEM Learning for Children by the Brookings Institution.
