= Hidden asset =

In finance, a hidden asset is an asset that is not shown on a balance sheet. An example of such an asset is the US$15 billion that United Airlines' frequent flyer program, MileagePlus, was estimated to be worth when it filed for Chapter 11 bankruptcy.

In divorce cases, a hidden asset is a property that is hidden by one spouse from the other and, as a result, is more difficult to discover during divorce proceedings.

== Accounting treatment of internally generated intangibles ==
Some hidden assets arise because accounting standards do not recognise certain internally generated intangible assets on the balance sheet. Internally generated goodwill is not recognised as an asset because it is not an identifiable resource that is separable or arises from contractual or other legal rights. Internally generated brands, mastheads, publishing titles, customer lists, and similar items are also not recognised as intangible assets under IAS 38.
