= D. E. Shaw & Co. =

U.S.-based investment management firm

D. E. Shaw & Co., L.P.

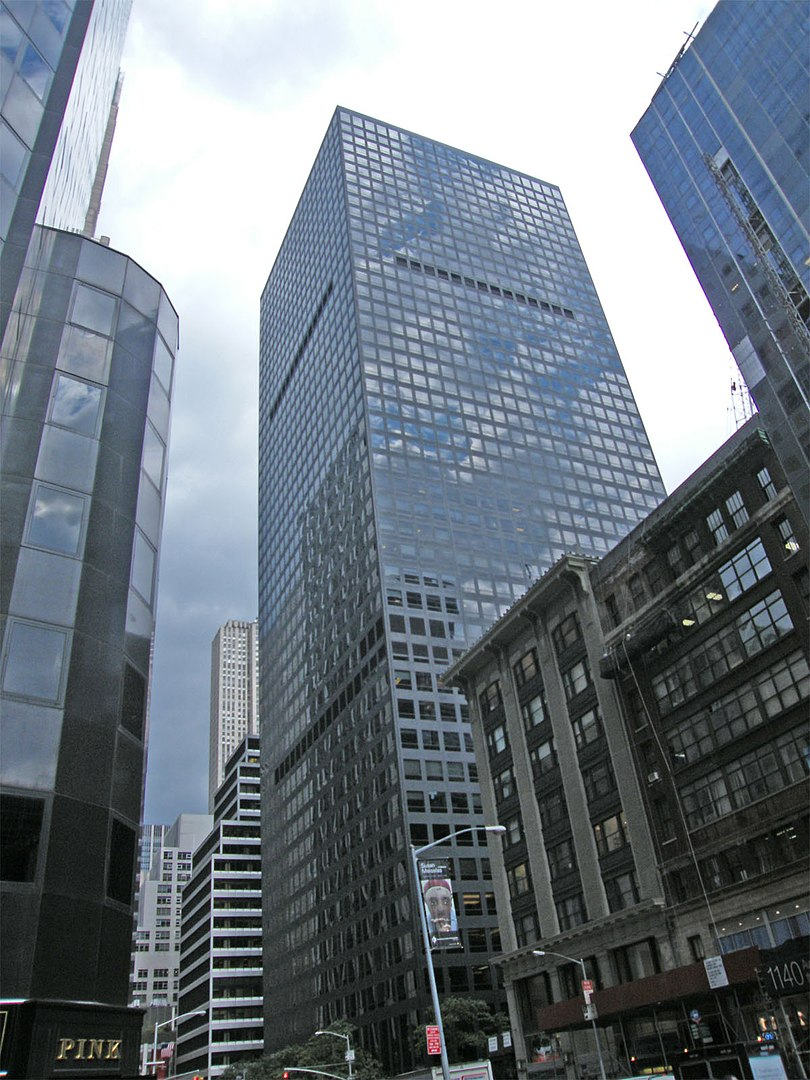
- Former Headquarters at 1166 Avenue of the Americas, in New York City
- Type: Limited partnership
- Industry: Hedge fund
- Founded: 1988; 38 years ago
- Founder: David E. Shaw
- Headquarters: Two Manhattan West, New York City, New York, U.S.
- Key people: Anne Dinning; Max Stone; Eric Wepsic; Eddie Fishman; Alexis Halaby; Edwin Jager; Elijah Schwab
- Products: Hedge fund, Private equity
- AUM: US$65 billion (2025)
- Number of employees: 2,500 (2022)
- Website: deshaw.com

D. E. Shaw & Co., L.P. is a multinational investment management firm founded in 1988 by David E. Shaw and based in New York City. The company is known for developing mathematical models and computer programs to exploit anomalies in financial markets. As of 2025, D. E. Shaw has $65 billion in assets under management, including alternative investments and long strategies.

Since 2020, the firm has had consecutive years of legal issues, including being held liable for defaming a former employee and being charged by the Securities and Exchange Commission for violating whistleblower protection laws.

== History ==
=== 1988–1996: Founding and early years ===
The company was founded by David E. Shaw, a former Columbia University computer science professor with a PhD from Stanford University. D. E. Shaw began investing in June 1989, having secured $28 million in capital from Donald Sussman's Paloma Partners and several private investors. The company carefully protected its proprietary trading algorithms. Many of its early employees were scientists, mathematicians, and computer programmers.

In 1994, the company's net return was 26 percent. It managed several hundred million dollars in "market-neutral strategies, including statistical arbitrage, Japanese warrant arbitrage, convertible-bond arbitrage and fixed-income trading." Its non-hedge fund activities in the mid-90s included setting up a broker-dealer subsidiary, founding the email provider Juno Online Services, launching an online banking and brokerage firm, and opening an office in India focused on developing software and systems to support the company's trading operations and online businesses.

=== 1997: Strategic alliance with Bank of America ===
In 1997, the firm returned capital to most of its early investors in favor of a structured credit facility of nearly $2 billion from Bank of America, with terms that allowed D. E. Shaw & Co. to keep a higher fraction of profits than hedge fund investors normally allow. In effect, Bank of America provided an infusion of $1.4 billion to D. E. Shaw, hoping to benefit from the latter's investment expertise. The 1998 Russian financial crisis resulted in large losses for D. E. Shaw's fixed-income portfolio. As a result, Bank of America lost $570 million due to its investment in D. E. Shaw, and paid out an additional $490 million to settle associated shareholder lawsuits.

Following the collapse of this alliance, D. E. Shaw laid off employees, reducing its workforce from 540 employees in 1999 to 180. The company's capital shrank from $1.7 billion to $460 million.

=== 2002: Management transfer ===
David E. Shaw directed the company from 1988 to 2001. In 2002, he removed himself from day-to-day involvement in order to focus on D. E. Shaw Research and transitioned leadership of day-to-day activities to a team of six of the firm's senior managing directors. The same six-member Executive Committee of Anne Dinning, Julius Gaudio, Louis Salkind, Stuart Steckler, Max Stone, and Eric Wepsic remained intact until 2012 when Steckler retired.

=== 2008 financial crisis ===
In August 2007, D. E. Shaw's multi-strategy fund had assets of $20 billion. A third of the fund's exposure was to the equity markets and equity-linked quantitative strategies. As a result, the fund lost five percent of its assets and had its worst-performing month to that point in time. By September 2008, the company's capital was four times leveraged. In the final months of 2008, gains on its then $15 billion multi-strategy funds were lost.

Twenty percent of the company's assets under management were in its credit strategies and were the hardest hit during the 2008 financial crisis.

To avoid further loss of portfolio value and asset fire sales, D. E. Shaw temporarily halted withdrawal of funds. By 2009, D. E. Shaw had returned about $2 billion at clients' requests. One year later, the Financial Times reported that investors estimated the company had honored an additional $7 billion in client redemption requests.

D. E. Shaw's total assets under management fell from a high of $34 billion in 2007 to $21 billion in 2010. The company had 1,300 employees, a reduction of 10% of its workforce.

=== 2019 - 2025: Legal controversies ===
==== 2019 non-compete agreements ====
In June 2019, following the departure of a former employee, D. E. Shaw required all of its employees to sign new contracts that included non-compete agreements or leave the firm. The new agreements, which were signed by the majority of employees, went into effect in September 2019.

==== 2022 defamation of a former employee ====
In 2022, D.E. Shaw and four of its executive committee members were held liable for defamation by a Financial Industry Regulatory Authority (FINRA) arbitration panel and ordered to pay a record sum of $52 million to a former employee, Daniel Michalow. The firm claimed after Michalow left in 2018 that it had fired him for sexual harassment. But the FINRA panel found the firm's claims to be false, which led to the record award to Michalow.

==== 2023 SEC charges for impeding employee whistleblowers ====
In 2023, the SEC charged D. E. Shaw with violating whistleblower protection rules by requiring firm employees to sign overly broad confidentiality agreements from 2011-2023. In some cases, the firm required departing employees to sign releases affirming that they had not filed any complaints with any government agency in order for the employees to receive deferred compensation. D.E. Shaw agreed to pay $10 million to settle the charges.

==== 2025 employee rights ====
Court documents revealed in 2025 showed that D.E. Shaw's employment agreements going as far back as 2004 required employees to waive their right to sue the firm for sexual harassment, discrimination, or regulatory concerns in order to receive deferred compensation payments. In 2023 D.E. Shaw updated employee terms to clarify that employees could cooperate with regulators but did not change other provisions.

== Investment strategy ==
The company manages a variety of investment funds that make extensive use of quantitative methods and proprietary computational technology to support fundamental research. The company also uses qualitative analysis to make private equity investments in technology, wind power, real estate, financial services firms, and distressed company financing. D. E. Shaw & Co. has also provided private equity capital to technology-related business ventures. Examples include Juno Online Services, an Internet access provider, and Farsight, an online financial services platform that was acquired by Merrill Lynch.

=== Assets under management ===
The company had $40 billion in aggregate capital and $15.6 billion in hedge fund AUM as of 2011. As of June 1, 2021, the company more than tripled in size with $55 billion in AUM, $35 billion of which are alternative investments and the remaining $20 billion long investments. It was ranked as the 21st-largest hedge fund by Institutional Investor in 2011. By 2020, D. E. Shaw & Co. was ranked as the 10th-largest hedge fund globally by discretionary AUM.

=== Private equity ===
==== U.S. ====
In 2004, a subsidiary of one of the company's funds acquired the toy store FAO Schwarz after it had filed for bankruptcy. FAO Schwarz reopened for business in New York and Las Vegas in the fall of 2004. In the same year, D. E. Shaw affiliate Laminar Portfolios acquired the online assets of KB Toys, which continued operating as eToys.com.

In 2006, the Financial Times reported the firm's involvement as a potential financing and investment partner for Penn National Gaming (the casino and racetrack company) as an example of the breadth of Wall Street firms' involvement in the "private equity boom," describing D. E. Shaw as "a hedge fund group." The financing was required as Penn National Gaming had a market value of $3.3 billion (2006) and $1.4 billion in annual revenues and wanted to acquire Harrah's Entertainment, a company with a market value of $14.7 billion (2006) and at that time the largest US casino operator.

In late 2009, the Financial Times reported that D. E. Shaw & Co. had set up a portfolio acquisitions unit, the aim of which was to acquire illiquid assets from rival hedge funds.

==== India ====
D. E. Shaw entered the Indian market in 2006, with Anil Chawla then the CEO of GE-Commercial finance, India & South East Asia, as the Country Manager. The India operations were initially headquartered in Hyderabad, Telangana. D. E. Shaw entered into several large private equity deals in the country. This included a joint-venture with India's largest private sector company, Reliance Industries, to provide financial services. Other investments included real estate company DLF Assets Limited and publishing group Amar Ujala Publications, which were subject to Indian regulatory scrutiny and legal disputes. Chawla left his position with D. E. Shaw in 2012.

D. E. Shaw scaled back its private equity activities in India after 2013.

== Corporate structure ==
=== Management ===
Currently, the Executive Committee comprises Anne Dinning, Max Stone, Eric Wepsic, Eddie Fishman, Alexis Halaby, and Edwin Jager. The firm has 2,500 employees.

=== Ownership ===
In 2007, David Shaw sold a 20 percent stake to Lehman Brothers as part of a broader strategy to diversify his personal holdings; D. E. Shaw had $30 billion of assets under management in 2007. At the time of its bankruptcy in September 2008, Lehman Brothers' holdings in D. E. Shaw & Co. remained intact.

In 2015, Hillspire, the family office of Google chairman Eric Schmidt, acquired the 20 percent passive ownership stake in D. E. Shaw & Co. from the bankruptcy estate of Lehman Brothers Holdings Inc.

== Corporate affairs ==
=== Corporate responsibility ===
D. E. Shaw supports educational programs such as the American Regions Mathematics League, United States of America Mathematical Olympiad, the International Mathematical Olympiad, Mathematical Olympiad Program, and The Center for Excellence in Education.

=== Office locations ===
The firm has offices in the United States, China, England, India, Singapore, Luxembourg, and Bermuda.

== See also ==
- Two Sigma Investments
- Renaissance Technologies
- D. E. Shaw Research
- Schrödinger, Inc.
