= Reflection AI =

American artificial intelligence company

- London offices of Reflection AI in 2 Pancras Sq (left)
- Type: Privately held company
- Industry: Artificial intelligence
- Founded: 2024; 2 years ago
- Founders: Misha Laskin; Ioannis Antonoglou
- Headquarters: New York City
- Products: Beam, Asimov
- Number of employees: 320 (2026)
- Website: reflection.ai

Reflection AI is an American artificial intelligence company that develops open foundation models and software agents for AI-assisted software development. Founded in 2024 by former Google DeepMind researchers Misha Laskin and Ioannis Antonoglou, the company initially focused on tools that automate software development. As of June 2026, Reflection's valuation is $25 billion.

Reflection positions itself as a US open weights AI lab, as an alternative to both Chinese labs and the proprietary models of leading US labs. Reflection reportedly plans to use revenue sharing licenses with its large language models (LLMs). In October, Reflection announced its first LLM, Beam, with 501 billion parameters.

Reflection has compute contracts with SpaceX, Nebius Group, and Shinsegae, and under the US government's Genesis Mission is set to provide models for the US national laboratories. Reflection is headquartered in New York City, with offices in San Francisco and London.

== Technology ==
Reflection's work combines large language model training, reinforcement learning, agentic AI, and software engineering automation. The company says it is developing open foundation models and advancing both pre-training and post-training systems, with an emphasis on reinforcement learning at scale.

In October 2025, Reflection said it had built a large-scale large language model and reinforcement learning platform capable of training mixture of experts models at frontier scale, first applying the approach to autonomous coding and later expanding it toward general agentic reasoning.

Reflection's first product was Asimov, a code-comprehension agent for engineering teams. Wired reported in July 2025 that Asimov reads source code, emails, Slack messages, project updates and documentation to answer questions about how software systems are built.

On 5 October 2026 Reflection announced its first model, Beam, with 501 billion parameters, 23 billion active. It was positioned as a “workhorse” that performs better than other Western open models at a much lower cost of inference compute. Beam performed similarly in benchmarks to GLM 5.2, a previous-generation open model by Chinese firm Z.ai. As of 10 October, the model remains in early access.

== Funding and partnerships ==
In March 2025, Reflection emerged from stealth with $130 million in financing, including a $25 million seed round and a $105 million Series A round. The financing valued the company at about $545 million.

In October 2025, Reflection raised $2 billion in a funding round that valued the company at $8 billion. Investors in the round included Nvidia, Eric Schmidt, Citigroup, 1789 Capital, Lightspeed Venture Partners and Sequoia Capital.

In March 2026, Reflection and Shinsegae signed a memorandum of understanding to build one of the country's largest facilities powering AI models, a 250-megawatt data center in South Korea, with Nvidia supplying tens of thousands of chips.

In May 2026, Axios reported that Reflection was partnering with the United States Department of Energy to support the Genesis Mission, a federal scientific research initiative, and would serve as the AI model provider for the U.S. National Laboratories.

In June 2026, Axios reported that Reflection had signed a compute agreement with SpaceXAI for access to chips and hardware from the SpaceX Colossus data center. Under the agreement, Reflection would pay $150 million per month starting July 1, 2026, through 2029, after an initial ramp period.

Following talks with investor JPMorgan Chase, Reflection was valued at $25 billion as of June 2026.

In July 2026, Reflection and Nebius signed an agreement for over $1 billion in computing power, allowing Reflection access to Nvidia's GB300 chips through 2029.

As of October 2026, Reflection lists its headquarters in New York City, with other offices in San Francisco and at 2 Pancras Square in London's King's Cross Central development.

== See also ==
- AI-assisted software development
- List of AI-assisted software development tools
- List of AI software developed at universities
- List of artificial intelligence companies
- List of chatbots
- List of large language models
- List of open-source artificial intelligence software
- List of university artificial intelligence research centers
