= Initial public offering of SpaceX =

2026 American company IPO

SpaceX IPO
- Stock exchange: Nasdaq (SPCX)
- Target valuation: US$1.77 trillion
- Number of shares: 555,555,555 Class A shares
- Target fundraising: US$75 billion
- Free float: approx. 5%
- Roadshow date: June 3–11, 2026
- Subscription price: US$135 per share
- Subscription date: June 3–11, 2026
- Institution:retail ratio: 70:30
- Greenshoe: 83,333,333 shares (15% of issue)
- Allotment date: June 11, 2026
- Listing date: June 12, 2026
- Lead underwriters: Goldman Sachs, Morgan Stanley
- Other underwriters: JPMorgan Chase, Bank of America, Citigroup
- First-day close: US$161 per share (+19%); market capitalization approx. US$2.1 trillion
- Index inclusion: Nasdaq-100 (15 trading days post-IPO); CRSP US Total Market Index (5 trading days post-IPO)
- Voting control (post-IPO): Elon Musk, 82–85% of voting power
- Lock-up period: 366 days (Musk and insiders); 180 days, staggered (other pre-IPO investors)
- Website: spacexipo.com

The initial public offering (IPO) of SpaceX, an American aerospace and artificial intelligence company founded by Elon Musk in 2002, occurred on June 12, 2026. It was the largest ever IPO, at a valuation of US$1.77 trillion. On the first trading day, the company reached a market capitalization of about $2.1 trillion, positioning SpaceX as the sixth most valuable U.S.-listed firm.

This valuation and the quantity of stock retained by Musk made him the first and only US dollar trillionaire, but it was highly controversial. By late July 2026, SpaceX shares had fallen approximately 50% from their peak reached during the week after the IPO, causing Musk to lose his trillionaire status.

The IPO raised $86 billion for the company's long-term ambitions, including building orbital artificial intelligence (AI) infrastructure to meet computing needs for xAI, a SpaceX subsidiary. The company chose to be listed on Nasdaq with the ticker symbol SPCX after securing a rule change allowing its early inclusion in the Nasdaq-100 index, but not the S&P 500 index.

== History ==
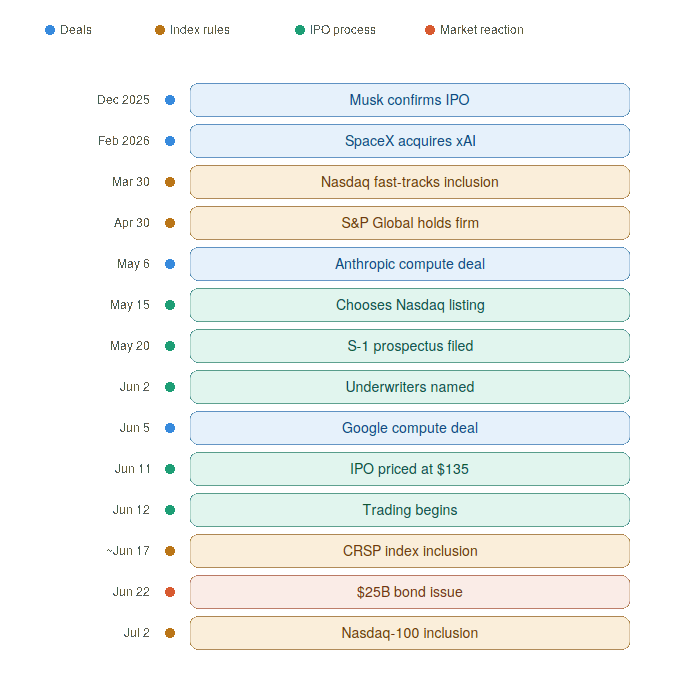
Timeline of SpaceX IPO calendar

After having rejected for many years taking SpaceX public, in December 2025 Elon Musk confirmed that SpaceX would be taken public at an unspecified date.

In February 2026, SpaceX acquired Musk's artificial intelligence company xAI at a valuation of $125 billion for xAI and $1 trillion for SpaceX, making the merged company the most valuable private company ever.

As of March 2026, the New York Stock Exchange and Nasdaq were competing for the IPO listing, and SpaceX requested early inclusion on the Nasdaq-100 index as a condition for listing on Nasdaq. On March 30, Nasdaq changed its rules to allow SpaceX and other large companies to be listed in the index 15 trading days after their IPO, instead of a minimum of three months and up to one year after. But because only 5% of SpaceX's shares would initially be available to the public, Nasdaq's float-adjustment rules gave SpaceX a weight of 1% in the index, versus 5% weight without the rule, initially mitigating any swings in the SpaceX stock price.

On April 30, S&P Global launched a public consultation relating to the treatment of megacap companies in its indices. It reaffirmed just prior to the listing that there would be no change to its rules which might have fast-tracked inclusion of SpaceX in the S&P 500 index. A press statement from the company announced: "Based on S&P DJI's Index Committee review of the markets and after consideration of responses received from a wide range of market participants, no changes will be made to the eligibility criteria including financial viability screens, seasoning period, or minimum IWF [Investable Weight Factor], for the S&P 500, S&P MidCap 400, or S&P SmallCap 600 … Accordingly, there will be no changes to existing methodology for this index family." Existing rules required a company to be profitable under Generally Accepted Accounting Principles (US GAAP) in its most recent quarter as well as for the sum of its most recent four quarters. SpaceX's net loss of $4.94 billion in 2025 rendered it ineligible for inclusion. However, S&P Global said it planned to modify its rules to allow SpaceX earlier entry into its less widely followed but broader S&P Total Market Index and Dow Jones U.S. Total Stock Market Index. Index provider FTSE Russell also changed its rules to allow SpaceX to be included earlier in both the Russell U.S. Equity Indexes and the FTSE Global Equity Index Series.

On May 6, Anthropic signed a contract of $1.25 billion per month with xAI, a subsidiary of SpaceX, to buy all the compute capacity at the Colossus 1 data center in Memphis, Tennessee, which has about 220,000 Nvidia graphics processing units (GPUs). Wired noted the deal was key for SpaceX's IPO. SpaceX said in 2026 that their AI progress is driven by compute and used it as a key metric in the AI training of its supercomputer Colossus, which across multiple data centers has 1 million GPUs.

On May 15, SpaceX chose to list on Nasdaq.

On May 20, SpaceX filed its S-1 prospectus, declaring plans to list on a US stock market the following month. The document disclosed which parts of the business were generating profits as well as the future plans, including building data centers in space.

On June 5, Google signed a cloud computing agreement, similar to Anthropic's, to pay $920 million monthly for cloud compute capacity from Colossus, without specifying which data center. The deal covers a computing infrastructure of approximately 110,000 Nvidia GPUs, hardware needed to power Google Gemini models. Google will pay a reduced rate through September 2026 and the full rate until 2029.

The final IPO price was $135 on June 11. Trading began on June 12. After the IPO, Musk controls 42% of the shares, but 82% of the voting power due to his super-voting stock.

== Share structure ==
SpaceX is one of a number of large corporations with a two-class structure of its stock shares, consisting of Class A and Class B shares. Investors in the IPO purchased Class A shares, which have one vote each in company voting. Class B shares, held by company insiders, have 10 votes per share. Elon Musk owned more than 5.5 billion Class B shares, and controlled 82% of votes. Musk had also been promised 1.3 billion shares as an incentive to successfully lead a Mars colonization effort that lands one million people on Mars. However, Musk is currently permitted to vote with those shares in advance of achieving that goal. When sold to outsiders, Class B shares automatically convert to Class A and lose 90% of their voting power. Professors Lucian Bebchuk and Kobi Kastiel, the authors of a research article on "The Perils of Small-Minority Controllers", have commented that the share structure of SpaceX "provide[s] Musk with substantial value at the expense of public investors" and lead to inefficiencies and distorted incentives.

Previously held shares and shares purchased during the IPO were subject to restrictions on their sale, known as a lock-up period. Musk and other insiders agreed to not sell their shares for 366 days. Other pre-IPO investors had a 180-day lock-up, but also permission to share parts of their holdings sooner, after a series of benchmarks, including SpaceX's announcements of its quarterly results.

Bloomberg reported in June 2026 that, due to concerns related to critical technology export controls and regulatory risks, underwriters denied subscription orders from investors in Hong Kong and China. As a result, capital from both Hong Kong and China, including private banking clients, was barred from participating in the offering.

== Valuation ==
=== Prospectus valuation and underwriter metrics ===
Goldman Sachs, Morgan Stanley, Bank of America, Citigroup and JPMorgan were named on June 2, 2026, as the joint underwriters for the offering, leading a syndicate of global investment banks underwriting the deal. Fees were to be less than 0.75% on the IPO, or about $500 million. Typically, fees are 4–7%.

In a move which Reuters qualified as "take-it-or-leave-it stock pricing", SpaceX's IPO price was set at $135 per share even before investor roadshows typically used by Wall Street to test demand ‌and set a price range.

SpaceX's $135 per share implied an enterprise valuation of $1.77 trillion. The prospectus relied heavily on a total addressable market (TAM) of $28.5 trillion—described as the largest in "human history"—of which roughly 90 percent ($25.6 trillion) was attributed to artificial intelligence through SpaceX's recently acquired xAI subsidiary.

The underwriters advanced revenue projections far exceeding independent estimates: Goldman Sachs privately projected $474 billion in total revenue by 2030 (versus $18.7 billion in 2025), while Morgan Stanley forecast $330 billion by 2030, and $3.4 trillion by 2040. SpaceX pointed to its compute contracts with Anthropic ($1.25 billion per month) and Google ($920 million per month) as evidence of AI revenue traction, with one analyst noting these added "$26 billion in annual run rate between the SEC [Security and Exchange Commission] filing date and the first trade". Both contracts, however, carried 90-day termination clauses. At the offering price, SpaceX traded at approximately 67 times trailing sales, roughly three times Nvidia's multiple at the time.

=== Analyst valuations and the overvaluation debate ===
Independent analysts converged on substantially lower valuations, with the AI-attributed TAM as the main point of contention.

SpaceX segment financials (2025–2026)
Dimension	Space	Connectivity (Starlink)	Artificial intelligence (xAI)
Revenue $18.7 billion (Full year 2025)	$4.1 billion (FY 2025).	$11.4 bn (FY 2025); $3.26 bn (Q1 2026).	$3.2 bn (FY 2025); $818m (Q1 2026)
Profitability -$4.94 billion (FY 2025); -$4.28 billion (Q1 2026)	-$657 million (FY 2025); -$619 million (Q1 2026)	+$4.4 bn (FY 2025)	-$3.2 bn (FY 2025); -$2.5 billion (Q1 2026)
Total addressable market (TAM) (overall $28.5 trillion)	$370 billion (1.35%)	$1,610 billion (5.65%)	$26,510 billion (93.0%)

"Dean of valuation" Aswath Damodaran separately modelled each of the launch, Starlink, and xAI business segments to arrive at an enterprise value of approximately $1.3 trillion. Noting xAI's huge losses, he questioned its ability to achieve a significant share of the $26 trillion TAM as "beyond plausible". However, Damodaran acknowledged the stock would trade very heavily, based on mood and momentum".

Morningstar placed fair value at $780 billion. Analysts Nicolas Owens and Suryansh Sharma described SpaceX as "significantly overvalued", and that in particular xAI's lack of clear competitive advantage was a "material threat of value destruction". Their most optimistic valuation of $1.97 trillion was predicated on full Starship reusability and commercially viable orbital data centers, to which they assigned a 7% probability of achieving. Owens and Sharma predicted the share price would rise in the near-term given the small public float and unprecedented fast-track Nasdaq-100 inclusion, but advised long-term investors to await better opportunities further down the line.

A structural critique from Cape Fear Advisors argued that SpaceX's actual AI position, mapped against identifiable sub-markets, supported at most $200–500 billion valuation – "approximately one to two percent of the $25.6 trillion AI TAM allocation the S-1 attests to". Cape Fear analysts noted that advertising-subsidized AI was structurally dominated by Google, that xAI's annualized revenue of roughly $500 million was a fraction of Anthropic's $30 billion and OpenAI's $25 billion in the enterprise market, and that SpaceX's strongest AI claim lay in defense and deployment, where its structural position was analogous to Palantir's in 2020.

Short-seller Jim Chanos described the offering as "very much a 'don't look at the man behind the curtain' situation", focusing on xAI's apparent pivot from developing frontier AI models to acting as a neocloud – a provider of GPU compute for third parties – which he characterized as "a commodity business valued far lower on the public markets". Hedge fund manager Michael Burry wrote on Substack that "nothing in that S-1 suggests it is worth $1 trillion let alone $2 trillion" and that any post-IPO gains would "be on hype and technicals".

Ross Gerber of Gerber Kawasaki, an existing SpaceX shareholder, described the IPO valuation as alarming given the company had been valued at $400 billion just thirteen months earlier. He attributed the extremely high price for this stock to confidence in Musk personally rather than conventional financial metrics.

Supporters countered that the Anthropic and Google contracts validated xAI's positioning, and that Starlink – the only profitable segment, with quarterly revenue of $3.26 billion and subscribers projected to grow from 10 million to nearly 17 million during 2026 – provided a solid commercial foundation.

== Market structure and retail investor exposure ==
=== Index inclusion, manufactured scarcity, and price dynamics ===
Being included in a major stock market index can significantly increase demand for a company's shares because institutional asset managers must buy shares to mirror the index. Rule changes about when SpaceX was to be included in an index were controversial because SpaceX was to be extremely expensive based on metrics like the price-revenue ratio, and skeptics were concerned that millions of Americans' retirement plans which invest using indexes would be exposed too soon to a volatile stock.

Critics argued that the combination of rule changes engineered around the IPO to allow early inclusion in indexes (the Nasdaq-100, the S&P Total Market, the Dow Jones U.S. Total Stock Market, the Russell U.S. Equity and the FTSE Global Equity) artificially inflated SpaceX's opening price at the expense of retail investors and retirement savers.

The central mechanism was the deliberate restriction of the public float. Only around 5 percent of SpaceX shares were made available to the public at flotation—far below the 10 percent minimum typically required by the SEC for a public listing, for which SpaceX obtained a waiver—while comparable large-caps such as Nvidia and Apple have over 90 percent of shares in public circulation. The one mitigation is Nasdaq's float-adjustment rules, which would give SpaceX an initial weight of 1% in the index, versus 5% weight previously, theoretically attenuating wild swings in the price of index funds.

Scott Galloway, professor of marketing at NYU's Stern School of Business, argued that this amounted to "the greatest degree of manufactured scarcity we've ever seen in an IPO": with some $30–50 billion in additional demand expected from index funds that would be forced buyers under new inclusion rules, constraining supply to a tenth of a typical float would produce extreme upward price velocity on debut. Similarly, David Brown, associate professor of finance at the University of Arizona, echoed the sentiment, but suggested that the forthcoming massive IPOs of Anthropic and OpenAI should cause index funds to deeply reflect on the timing for index inclusion them because: "For most investors, that’s where it’s going to hit".

The Nasdaq rule change compounded this effect. Having made early Nasdaq-100 inclusion a condition of listing on the exchange, SpaceX secured entry to the index just 15 trading days after its IPO, triggering mandatory purchases by every fund tracking the index. Nasdaq further applied a threefold multiplier to SpaceX's index weight to compensate for its low float, so holders of the QQQ ETF received a disproportionately large exposure to the stock. The CRSP US Total Market Index, used by Vanguard as a benchmark for its broad index funds, added SpaceX just five trading days after the IPO. The Russell 1000 followed within approximately a week. Only the S&P 500 held to its existing rules, which require 12 months of public trading and four consecutive profitable quarters before inclusion.

=== Wealth transfer and retail investor risk ===
Several commentators were concerned about the cumulative effect of these mechanisms as a transfer of wealth from ordinary investors to SpaceX insiders. Professor Galloway estimated that SpaceX could account for 4–6 percent of Nasdaq-100 and MSCI index products, forcing trillions of dollars in assets under management to rush to buy. Robin Wigglesworth, editor at the Financial Times, was more pointed still: "When you see an IPO give a far larger allocation to ordinary investors, it's usually a sign that they can't get professional investors to buy it at that price. The price is nuts."

Eric Gardner, contributor at the nonprofit newsroom More Perfect Union, argued that Musk had "financially engineered the IPO as a massive wealth transfer from everyday investors to insiders": early investors – namely backers of Musk's buyout of Twitter and other shareholders of X and xAI – would be able to cash out at the inflated IPO price, while retail investors holding index-fund investments would be compelled to buy through index purchasing. George Pearkes, an investment strategist quoted in Gardner's report, commented: "Every piece of evidence we have is that the IPO is being engineered to rise very rapidly after it prices, and then fall very dramatically after that. That is a recipe for retail investors, especially, to take large losses."

In practice, the immediate impact on individual retirement accounts was modest. The CRSP float-adjusted weighting gave SpaceX roughly 0.1 percent of a total US market index fund at opening prices, meaning a $50,000 index fund position would hold approximately $57 of SpaceX stock – less than a tenth of the same portfolio's Tesla exposure. Rodney Comegys, chief investment officer at Vanguard Capital Management, was comforted by the fact that "even mega IPOs will enter broad indexes at very small weights, so the near-term impact on 401(k)s is limited." However, index weight is expected to grow substantially as insider lock-up periods expire and more shares enter circulation.

Robert Greifeld, former NASDAQ CEO, said in a CNBC interview that the largest IPO in history could give rise to the expiry of the largest lockup in the history. He stated that some highly price-insensitive sellers would be looking for the exit over the next 5 to 6 months, saying that: "If you’re a long-term investor in private shares and you’re sitting on a 20-times return, you might not care if you get a 19.5 times return or 21 times return."

=== Underwriter conduct: Grok subscriptions and client penalties ===
Two aspects of the IPO process drew attention for the pressure exerted on market participants. In April 2026 the New York Times reported that Musk required the banks managing the IPO to purchase subscriptions to Grok as a condition of involvement in the deal. Some banks had agreed to spend tens of millions of dollars annually on the product and had begun integrating it into their IT systems. In addition to mandatory Grok subscriptions, advertising on X was also part of the deal, but internal bank sources described these as merely "requests".

Separately, several underwriting banks and brokers reportedly warned clients that participation in the SpaceX IPO would be conditional on past behavior: those who had previously flipped IPO shares – selling shortly after debut to capture the opening pop – risked being excluded from the allocation. The practice of penalizing short-term sellers to protect IPO price stability is not uncommon, but its application to an offering of this scale and public profile attracted additional scrutiny given the broader concerns about retail investor access and pricing fairness.

== Reception ==
According to Reuters, "Investors have scrambled to secure a position in the deal, drawn by Elon Musk's track record and the potential for the offering to generate millions of dollars in fees for Wall Street firms." However, IPOs are considered risky investments in general with Forbes stating "some analysts have warned that early exposure to Elon Musk's aerospace firm will likely be risky." Morningstar said that SpaceX "has been significantly overvalued", and that the stock could be acquired at "more attractive levels" following its IPO, because the market value is predicated on "novel revenue streams, such as orbital computing". Truist, Michael Burry, and other analysts also warned against early trading of the stock.

To represent a sample of retail investors' reactions, The Guardian asked people in the US their views on the SpaceX initial public offering (IPO) and how it might affect them. The article highlighted remarks of concern and misgivings about the potential effect on their retirement savings. Interviewees described the IPO and the company itself as "a scam" and the encompassing AI bubble as "pernicious".

== Post-IPO ==
=== Bond issue ===
Ten days after the listing, SpaceX launched a $20 billion bond issue to "repay the outstanding borrowings under its bridge loan facility in full, to pay related fees and expenses, and any remaining amount for general corporate purposes". The bonds were priced in five different tranches, with maturity dates between 2031 and 2056 and varying rates – from 5.35% for the 2031 bonds to 6.65% at the long end. The issue was oversubscribed more than threefold but unnerved equity investors. While enthusiasm for the offer allowed the company to increase the issue size to $25 billion, the stock price dropped.

=== Analysts' projections ===
Roughly a month after the record-breaking $75 billion Nasdaq debut, and only days after analysts at more than a dozen underwriting banks published almost uniformly bullish 12-month price targets, SpaceX shares fell below their $135 IPO price and continued sliding toward $123–125 – nearly 40% below the peak of $211. Of the 23 underwriting banks, 17 issued specific price targets 12–18 months out. The extremes were represented by Raymond James at the top end with $800 while Stifel's forecast of $190 was at the bottom end. Another outlier was Morgan Stanley, whose analyst predicted $300. The remaining 14 forecasts clustered tightly between $200 and $250, with a $225 median – implying that they expect the enterprise value to rise by $1 trillion to $3 trillion. Professor Jay Ritter at the University of Florida – a leading authority on IPOs – argues this uniformity reflects "copycat" behavior, where banks anchor to each other's numbers rather than independently modeling a company with no profitable track record, arguing it's inherently difficult to value a firm that lost $4.9 billion on under $19 billion of revenue in 2025 (105x sales) and spends $5 for every $4 it collects. With no established profitability or comparable metrics/benchmarks to draw on, analysts default to appending a large, generically bullish percentage gain rather than genuinely differentiated valuation work – a pattern Ritter calls "mechanical." The article notes the underwriters collectively earned about $500 million (a 0.66% fee) from the offering, creating a structural incentive to publish optimistic research supporting the deal they had just sold to clients.

== See also ==
- Initial public offering of Facebook
- Initial public offering of Anthropic
