= Initial public offering of Saudi Aramco =

Saudi Aramco IPO
- Stock exchange: Saudi Exchange

Saudi Aramco, the national oil company of Saudi Arabia had its initial public offering (IPO) on December 11, 2019. It was the largest IPO until the initial public offering of SpaceX on June 11, 2026.
