= Kyle Kosic =

American artificial intelligence engineer

Kyle Kosic is an American artificial intelligence engineer.

Kosic worked at OnScale as a software engineer and as a quantitative analyst at Lucena Research. In 2021, he joined OpenAI. In May 2023, he joined xAI. In June 2024, he left xAI and returned to OpenAI where he worked on the technical staff. In 2026, he joined Project Prometheus, a start-up founded by Jeff Bezos in 2025 which is focused on the use of AI in the physical world including industrial applications.
