= Use of artificial intelligence by the United States Department of Defense =

The United States Department of Defense has been analyzing and employing military applications of artificial intelligence since at least 2014. The program initially focused on drones and other robots, but has also been using large language models for military research and analysis. The current US policy on lethal autonomous weapons is Department of Defense Directive 3000.09, updated in January 2023.

== Background ==
The United States Department of Defense began developing lethal autonomous weapons as early as the Reagan administration. An early version of the Tomahawk missile could have been used to destroy Soviet ships without direct human control; the initiative was abandoned after the United States and the Soviet Union signed START I. By 2014, the United Kingdom, Israel, and Norway had already begun using missiles equipped with artificial intelligence systems. The Department of Defense established a policy on the use of artificial intelligence in 2012.

== History ==
=== 2016–2017: Carter secretaryship ===
Footage from a drone equipped with an artificial intelligence system at Camp Edwards in August 2016

In May 2016, secretary of defense Ash Carter stated that his Third Offset strategy would include utilizing artificial intelligence as a military advantage. The New York Times reported that year that the Department of Defense had tested an autonomous drone at an approximation of a Middle Eastern village at Camp Edwards. Deputy secretary of defense Robert O. Work, who advocated for developing artificial intelligence, told the Times that the United States needed to compete with China and Russia by having a tactical advantage they could not easily replicate. The initiative was developed by DARPA beginning in 2015. The use of artificial intelligence in the U.S. military was controversial within the department; in February, Paul Scharre, who worked for the Office of the Secretary of Defense in the secretaryships of Robert Gates and Leon Panetta, published a report about the risks of artificial intelligence for broad military applications.

=== 2017–2019: Mattis secretaryship ===
By 2017, the United States Air Force had already begun using artificial intelligence in military robots. The Air Force's use of Neurala, an artificial intelligence company, concerned officials in the Department of Defense after an investigation found that Neurala had accepted money from an investment firm with funding from a state-run Chinese company. The Department of Defense began heavily investing in artificial intelligence after Work established Project Maven, an initiative to encourage the development and integration of artificial intelligence in the military, in April 2017. In May 2018, secretary of defense Jim Mattis privately expressed to president Donald Trump that he needed to establish a national strategy on artificial intelligence, quoting an article from former secretary of state Henry Kissinger that called for a presidential commission on the technology. The Department of Defense established the Joint Artificial Intelligence Center the following month. Google began working with the Department of Defense on analyzing drone footage as early as March. Google's involvement in the initiative led to protests from employees and mass resignations. Seeking to quell internal unrest, Google stated it would not renew its contract with the Department of Defense in June. The Department of Defense announced an artificial intelligence contract with Microsoft in October.

=== 2025–present: Hegseth secretaryship ===
In December 2025, Defense Secretary Pete Hegseth announced GenAI.mil, an artificial intelligence platform for the Department of Defense. In a video announcing the platform, Hegseth stated that Department of Defense workers would be able to "conduct deep research, format documents and even analyze video or imagery." The Department of Defense contracted first Gemini by Google, then ChatGPT by OpenAI, and finally Grok by xAI for the platform. Claude by Anthropic was also contracted by the Department of Defense and was in use on secure servers until it was revealed that Claude had been used in the 2026 operation to capture Nicolás Maduro, who was at the time the leader of Venezuela. This revelation sparked a high-profile dispute over Anthropic's ability to constrain Claude's usage, resulting in the termination of Anthropic's $200 million defense contract. The Department of Defense also moved to label Anthropic a supply chain risk, which was later blocked by a federal judge.

In June 2026, court filings revealed that a government version of Grok was used within the Pentagon's Maven Smart System during military operations against Iran as part of the 2026 Iran war. According to Chief Digital and Artificial Intelligence Officer Cameron Stanley, the system supported the deployment of more than 2,000 munitions against 2,000 distinct targets within a 96-hour period.

== See also ==
- Artificial intelligence industry in the United States
