= Moe Iori =

Japanese gravure idols and female cosplayer

- 伊織もえ
- Moe Iori at WirForce, 2026
- Born: January 24, 1993 (age 33); Chiba Prefecture, Japan
- Occupations: Streamer; YouTuber; Cosplayer

Twitch information
- Channel: 伊織もえ (moe_iori)
- Followers: 340K

YouTube information
- Channels: Moe Iori
- Years active: 2016–present
- Genres: Music; entertainment; gaming; vlogs
- Subscribers: 425K
- Views: 32.1 million

Moe Iori (伊織もえ; born January 24, 1993) is a Japanese cosplayer, gravure idol, online streamer, radio personality, and YouTuber.

== Biography ==
Moe Iori at Comic Market 99 (Photo taken on December 30, 2021)

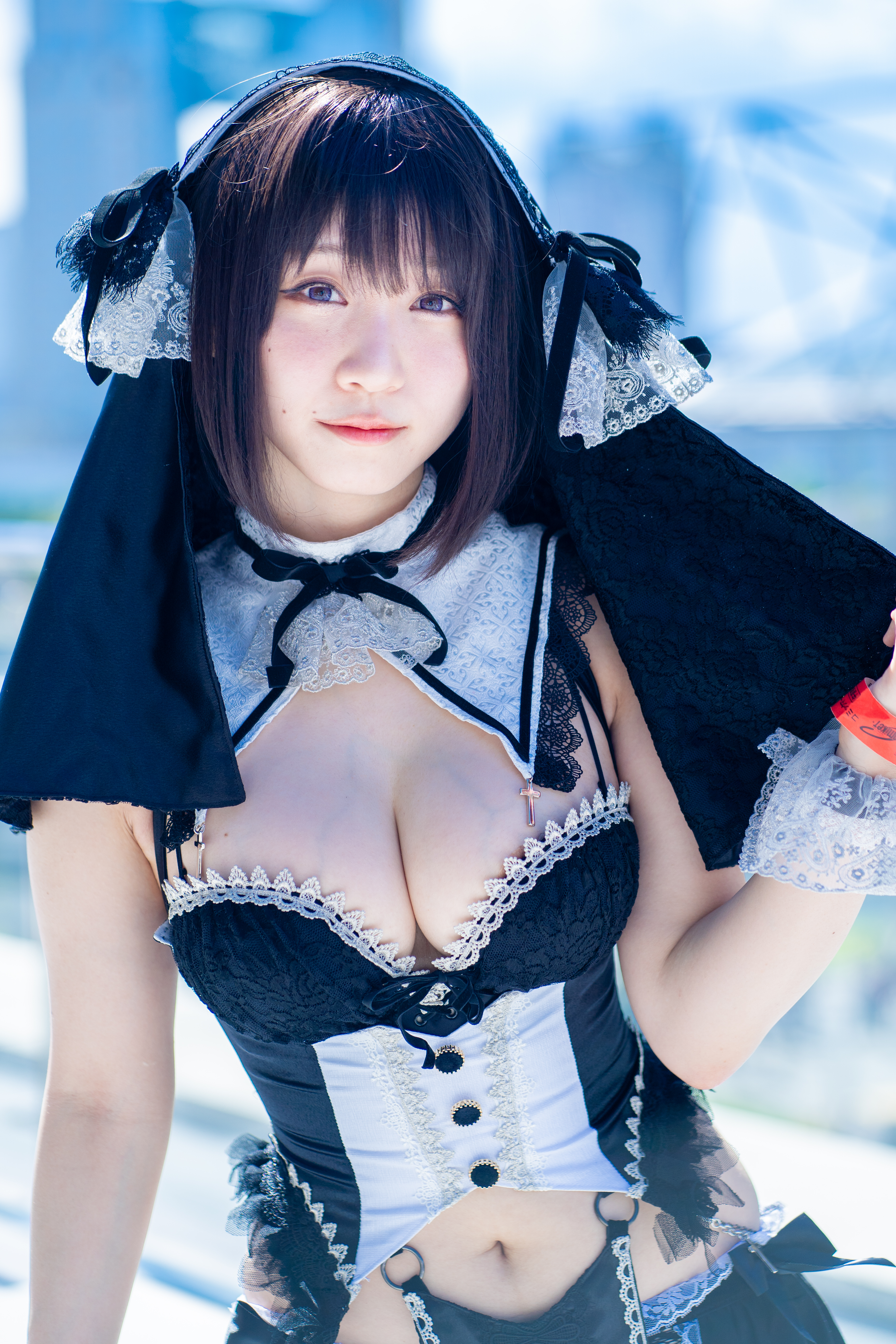
Moe Iori at Comic Market 102 (Photo taken on August 12, 2023)

She is active in a wide range of fields—primarily as a cosplayer, but also as a gravure model, radio personality, and game streamer—and has a total of over 5 million social media followers (as of January 2025).

She is very popular in Taiwan that she was invited by the Taipei City Government, and she is active both domestically and internationally serving as a PR ambassador for Tokyo Comic Con, an ambassador for Anime Festival Asia, one of Singapore's largest events, collaborating with LaLaport in Malaysia, and being invited to many other overseas events.

She also appears as a female streamer at large-scale offline events such as the CR Cup, Epe Matsuri, and the Streamer Hyper Game Tournament. Her skills are such that she plays alongside professional players at esports events featuring games like Apex Legends and VALORANT.

She was affiliated with PP Enterprises starting in April 2021, but announced her departure in August 2023 and returned to her own agency, “Very Cute Co., Ltd.”.

== Personal life ==
She is known for her devotion to her fans. As a child, she was shy and reserved. She was so embarrassed that she couldn’t even read aloud from her textbook when called on, but after she started cosplaying, she had more opportunities to talk to people, and her personality became more outgoing. Every year, as a token of gratitude to her fans, she organizes a Valentine's Day event where she personally hands out chocolates to fans who attend.

She is known for her deep knowledge of manga; she owns 4,000 volumes on Kindle alone and over 3,000 volumes in digital comic formats, and has served as a judge for numerous manga awards.

Although she is hardworking, she makes a conscious effort not to think of her efforts as “hard work” in her own mind. She explained the reason for this, stating, “If I think, ‘I really worked hard,’ I feel like that's where it ends. Even if I feel I’ve put in the effort or studied, I try not to think of it as ‘hard work’”.

Her hobbies include disc dog and camping. Her special skills include sewing, flower arrangement, and the tea ceremony.

Moe Iori has an older brother and a younger brother, Since her parents and siblings all love anime and manga, she was exposed to and grew to love these works from a young age. When she was in elementary school, she was taken to Comic Market, where she was introduced to the culture of cosplay. She is currently active in various fields, including gravure modeling and radio hosting, and has over 2 million followers on major social media platforms. Her activities have attracted thousands of fans not only in Japan but also overseas, and she is known as “the world’s most powerful cosplayer.”

Her hobbies include Disc Dog competitions and camping. She is currently learning Chinese and often seeks advice from Yami, a cosplayer from Shanghai, China. Her special skills include sewing, ikebana, and the tea ceremony. Her favorite works include Sailor Moon, Bocchi The Rock!, and From Bureaucrat to Villainess, among others.

After Shūkan Bunshun reported that she had a boyfriend, she posted on Twitter openly acknowledging the relationship and stating that the two had been dating for 10 years.

== As a cosplayer ==
She first encountered cosplay culture at Comic Market, where she was taken by her parents. Her homemade cosplay at the event led to the launch of an official figure project. She has been invited to official stages and appointed as an official cosplayer, and much of her activity revolves around her homemade cosplay. While she often sacrifices sleep to create her costumes, she says she enjoys the process—gritty and all. She is particularly particular about the silhouette of her costumes.

When asked what it takes to make cosplay a viable career, she replied, “The most important thing is to always respect the character you’re cosplaying and the series they belong to, to nurture your motivation and passion for the character, and to use that to collaborate with the creators. Without the cooperation of the rights holders, it cannot be a viable career”.

She appeared on the cover and in the opening photo spread of Young Gangan (issue released October 18, 2019) in a collaboration with the manga My Dress-Up Darling. She has continued to collaborate with the series through cosplay, and costumes she created herself were displayed at the series’ large-scale exhibition, the “Kisekoi Exhibition”.

She has been involved in promotions for famous works such as re:Zero, Tokyo Revengers, My Dress-Up Darling, and The Dangers in My Heart from the early stages of their serialization to the present, and frequently appears on magazine covers through cosplay collaborations and other features.

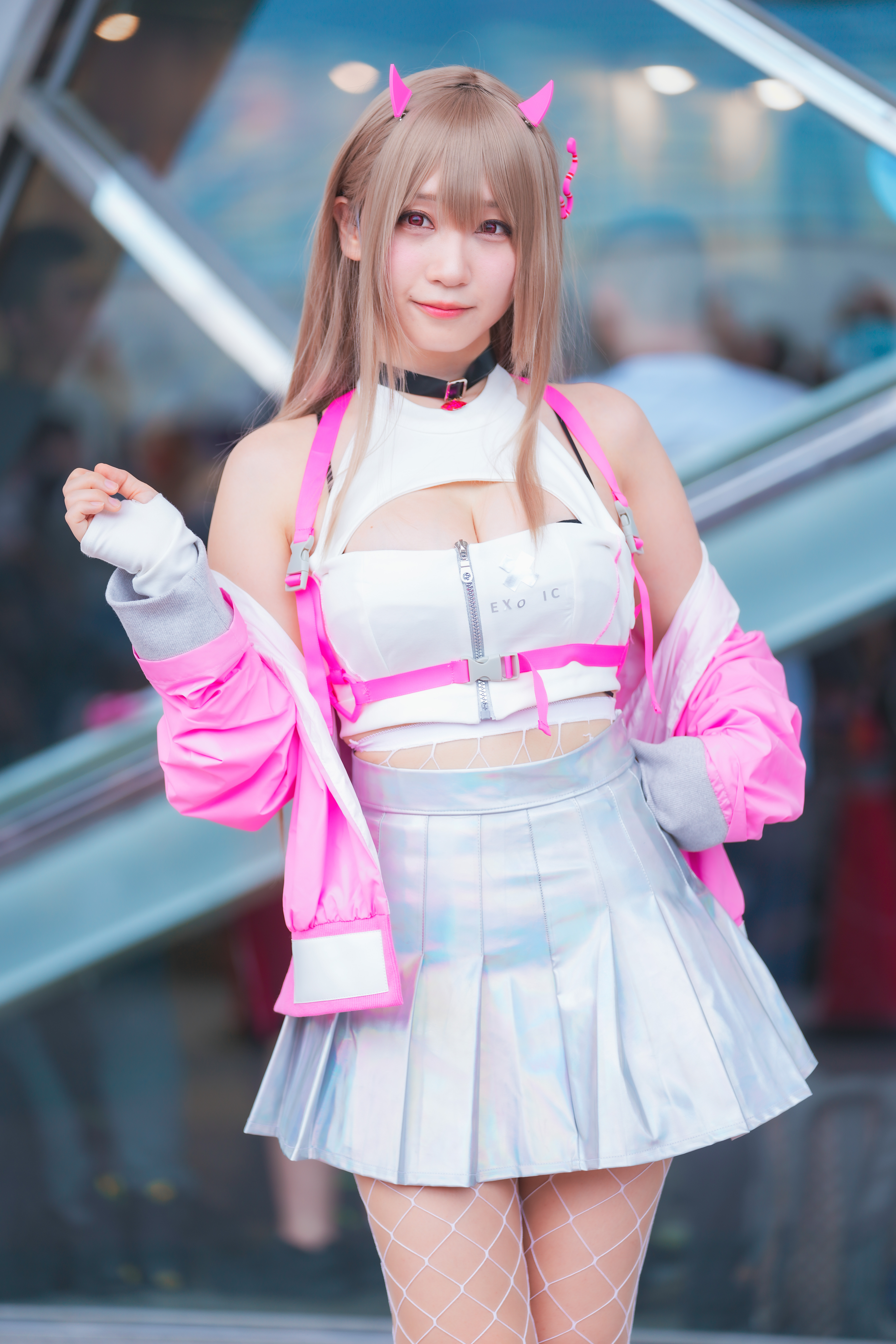
Goddess of Victory: NIKKE Viper cosplay (photographed August 19, 2023)

== As a gravure idol ==
She made her debut as a gravure idol in Weekly Young Jump in 2018. As of December 2024, she has already graced the covers of more than 150 magazines, averaging one magazine cover per week.

She has always loved gravure and went through a phase where she bought 10 photobooks a month. Even now, she personally handles all the arrangements—from the studio and costumes to the photo shoot—and manages everything from retouching to printing. She sometimes even does her own styling and makeup for commercial magazines.

Her appearance on the cover of Weekly Young Jump in fiscal year 2019 led to the magazine ranking first in sales.

Over the four years leading up to September 2022, she reached a cumulative total of 100 magazine covers. That same month, she held the #Kyurun Moe Iori Exhibition (#きゅるん 伊織もえ展) at Tower Records Shibuya, featuring her 100 covers and costumes. The exhibition attracted nearly 10,000 fans.

== As a streamer ==
=== As a YouTuber ===
Prompted by the COVID-19 pandemic, she began hosting Sunday-only live streams on YouTube to encourage her fans to stay home on weekends (she herself took up embroidery during this time). Although she had occasionally started streaming video games as well, her channel was suddenly deleted by Google, the operator of YouTube, without warning. Although she was unaware of any violations of YouTube’s terms of service and the reason for the deletion remained unclear, on February 12, 2021, her channel suddenly returned to its pre-deletion state.

=== As a streamer ===
She currently focuses her activities on Twitch. Her favorite games include FPS titles, Monster Hunter, Overwatch, Dead by Daylight, Apex Legends, VALORANT, and mobile games, and she streams a wide variety of content.

She frequently streams playthroughs of various horror games, showing a calm and composed demeanor that contrasts with her usual style.

Using Twitch's Watch Party feature, she hosts the “Moeyo Roadshow,” a simultaneous movie-watching event. She hosted these simultaneous viewings of movies such as The Greatest Showman, And Interstellar (film), and Harry Potter, accompanied by commentary from his unique perspective; however, the series ended in March 2024 when the feature was discontinued. Following requests from many fans, she rented a real movie theater and held a live “Moeyo Roadshow” event while screening Chef (2014 film).

== As a radio personality ==
She hosted her first-ever self-titled show, “Strawberries, Lemons, and Muscats: A Advice Show with Moe Iori and AI,” which aired on Tokyo Broadcasting System Television starting April 6, 2019, and starting in October 2020, InterFM began airing “Moe Iori’s CHUCHU Tuesday ~Late-Night Radio~,” commonly known as “Moechu,” a one-hour live program centered on anime, manga, and video games.

== Appearances ==
=== Movies ===
- Beautiful Dreamer (2020) – as Iori Moé
- Kakegurui: Russian Roulette (2021) – as Moemi
- Tokyo Revengers (2021) – as a hostess

=== TV Commercials ===
- Earth Defense Force: Iron Rain (April 11, 2019, D3 Publisher)
- Omurice You Can Make Right in the Bag (February 28, 2020, Nippon Ham)
- Game of Familia (March 5, 2020, KADOKAWA)
- OSMO POCKET (March 14, 2019, DJI) – Appeared in promotional video
- Echocalypse -The Scarlet Covenant- (October 28, 2022)
- Tokyo Comic Con 2023
- Tokyo Comic Con 2024

=== Music Videos ===
- ASCA “CHAIN” (January 18, 2020)
- XIIX “Halloween Knight” (2020)

=== Stage ===
- Stage Play “AGASA” The Perfect Serial Killer (December 11, 2024)

=== Fashion ===
- KANSAI COLLECTION 2021 A/W (September 5, 2021, Kyocera Dome Osaka) – Appearance

=== Official Cosplay ===
- Final Fantasy Brave Exvius (December 2, 2018, Square Enix) – Fina
- Ane Naru Mono (December 15, 2018, Revolve Co., Ltd.) – Chiya
- Majo Heiki (Witch Weapon) (September 14, 2019, DMM GAMES) – Baiju
- Atelier Ryza (September 15, 2019, Koei Tecmo Games) – Reisalin Stout
- Re:Zero (November 9, 2019, KADOKAWA) – Emilia
- Arknights (January 8, 2020, Yostar) – Amiya, Texas, W, Eyjafjalla, Kal’tsit
- A Certain Magical Index: Imaginary Fest (January 20, 2020, Kadokawa Games) – Misaka Mikoto
- Tokyo Revengers (Kodansha) – Mikey
- Goddess of Victory: Nikke (Level Infinite) – Marian, Rapi, Dorothy, Viper
- Tower of Fantasy (Level Infinite) – Claudia
- I’m a Behemoth, an S-Ranked Monster, but Mistaken for a Cat, I Live as an Elf Girl’s Pet (Hakusensha) – Aria
- Parallel Paradise (Kodansha) – Rumi, Lilia, Lea Mary
- Hololive – Shirogane Noel
- Mobile Suit Gundam collaboration gravure – Gundam-motif costume, Dom-motif costume (Young Jump)
- Fate/stay night (TYPE-MOON) – Archer, Matou Sakura
- My Dress-Up Darling (Square Enix) – Kitagawa Marin
- 2.5 Dimensional Seduction (Shueisha) – Lilysa, Liliel
- Artery Gear: Fusion (2021, bilibili) – Cream
- Wuthering Waves (KURO GAMES) – Ollie (or Oriē)
- Sword of Convallaria (XD Entertainment) – Maitha
- Go! Go! Muffin (XD Entertainment) – Mage
- Ash Echoes (UJOYGAMES) – Shiratori Azusa
- Azur Lane (YoStar) – Atago, Azuma
- Looking Up to Magical Girls (KADOKAWA) – Magia Baiser
- ja:GIGANT (Big Comic Superior, Shogakukan) – Papico
- Infection (Kodansha) – Kirara (Isonami Kirara), Ragi-nee (Kisara Chika), Enami-senpai
- The Dangers in My Heart (Akita Shoten) – Yamada Anna
- Amano Megumi is Full of Gaps! (Shogakukan) – Amano Megumi
- Yurukill: The Siren of the Dead (Izanagi Games) – Azami Rina
- Echocalypse − Scarlet Covenant − (YOOZOO) – White-feathered Girl
- Tougen Anki collaboration gravure (Shonen Champion, Akita Shoten)
- Saekano: How to Raise a Boring Girlfriend (KADOKAWA) – Kato Megumi
- VALORANT (RIOT GAMES) – Killjoy, Neon
- Blue Protocol: Star Resonance (2025, ja:XD (企業)) – Tina

=== TV Programs, Radio & Events ===
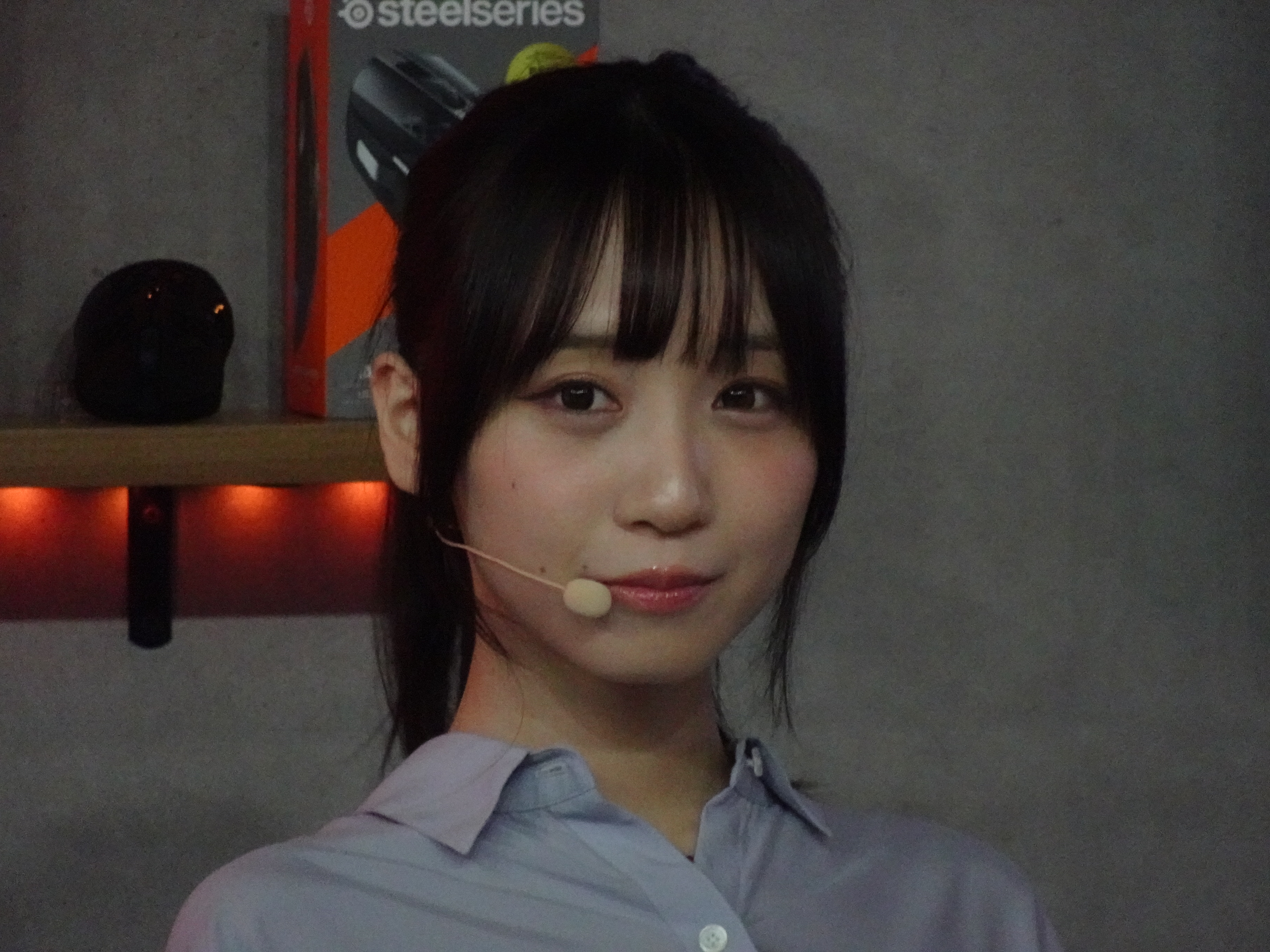
Moe Iori at the "OooDa & Moe Iori ~Game School~" stage at the Tokyo Game Show 2024 (photo taken on September 29, 2024)

- Tokyo Game Show 2024 “OooDa & Iori Moe ~Game School~ Stage” featuring Iori Moe (photographed September 29, 2024)
- The Reason He Fell in Love with Me – Drama Special
- Keishicho Sosa Ikka Cho Season 5 Episode 3 (April 29, 2021, TV Asahi) – as Iori Moe
- Bushido Stuntman Osaka-kun! Episode 5 (August 23, 2021, Nippon TV) – as Inma-chan
- Domestic na Kanojo (2019) – Next episode preview filming cooperation
- Sono Bisque Doll wa Koi wo Suru (2022) – Cooperation
- Shin Shock Kan (TV Tokyo) – Multiple appearances
- Ichigo to Lemon to Muscat ~Iori Moe & AI’s Advice Consultation Program~ (April 6 – September 28, 2019, TBS Radio) – Main personality, first solo program
- After 6 Junction (September 30, 2019, TBS Radio) – Guest
- Akai Tamao Tama Musubi (September 30, 2019, TBS Radio) – “Comic Cmoa presents Everyone’s Choice! * Digital Comic Awards 2020·2021” Special Navigator
- Kirin Ichiban Shibori One More Pint! Brother Tom (November 1, 2019, FM NACK5) – Guest
- Limelight Utamaru to My Game My Life (December 26, 2019, TBS Radio) – Guest
- ja:TOKYO SPEAKEASY (TOKYO FM)
- May 7, 2020 – Talk with Yuko Sugamoto
- July 18, 2023 – Talk with regular Tuesday guest Yoichi Ochiai
- Iori Moe’s CHUCHU Tuesday ~Late-Night Radio~ (October 6, 2020 – March 28, 2023, interfm) – Main personality, second solo program
- Iori Moe’s ACG Live Chu! (April 4, 2023 – June 25, 2024, interfm) – Program name renewal
- Iori Moe’s Denno Radio (July 2, 2024 –, interfm) – Program name renewal
- Asagaya Sisters’ Obasan Datte Dekiru wa yo (November 26, 2019, Nippon TV)
- Streamer Hyper Game Tournament (March 25–26, 2023, OPENREC.tv)
- 2nd Streamer Hyper Game Tournament (March 16–17, 2024, OPENREC.tv)
- Tokyo Game Show 2024 · Makuhari Messe Hall 5 Ujoy Games booth “Ash Echoes” stage event (September 28, 2024)
- Tokyo Game Show 2024 · Makuhari Messe Hall 6 Happinet booth “Touhou Fantasy Mahjong TGS Special Match ~Noda Crystal & Iori Moe Challenge Strong Opponents!~” (September 28, 2024)
- Tokyo Game Show 2024 · Makuhari Messe Hall 2 Intel booth “EVOTOP Special Stage” (September 29, 2024)
- Tokyo Game Show 2024 · Makuhari Messe Hall 2 SteelSeries booth “OooDa & Iori Moe ~Game School~ Stage” (September 29, 2024)
- Tokyo Comic Con 2023 PR Ambassador
- Tokyo Comic Con 2024 PR Ambassador

== Bibliography ==
=== Photobooks ===
- Wrap the BOOBs 2 (May 2, 2018, Ichijinsha, photography: Yuji Suzaki) ISBN 978-4758015981
- Boku to Moe. (January 22, 2019, Kodansha, photography: Kojiro Hosoi) ISBN 978-4065147832
- Naisho-banashi (October 1, 2021, Akita Shoten, photography: Takeo Dec.) ISBN 978-4253011112
- Iori no Kokoro ga Yabai Yatsu (August 8, 2022, Akita Shoten, photography: Takeo Dec.) ISBN 978-4253011167 ※ Collaboration photobook with Boku no Kokoro no Yabai Yatsu

=== Digital Photobooks ===
2018
- Bazuru G-Cup (June 21, 2018, Kodansha 〈FRIDAY Digital Photobook〉, photography: Takao Karaki)
2019
- Chikyu no Sumi no Chiisana Kiseki (August 1, 2019, Akita Shoten 〈Young Champion Digigra〉)
2020
- Moe to Yukemuri (March 1, 2020, Akita Shoten 〈Young Champion Digigra〉)
2021
- Fantasy wa Koko kara (April 1, 2021, Shueisha 〈YJ PHOTO BOOK〉, photography: Takanori Fujishiro) Co-starring: Enako, Kokoro Shinozaki
- Sansai Kanojo (May 24, 2021, Shonen Gahosha 〈YK PHOTO ALBUM〉, photography: Yoshinobu Nemoto) Co-starring: Enako, Kokoro Shinozaki
- Tawawa Moe (July 26, 2021, Shonen Gahosha 〈YK PHOTO ALBUM〉, photography: Masafumi Nakayama)
- E ni mo Egakenai Otakara (August 5, 2021, Shueisha 〈YJ PHOTO BOOK〉, photography: Takanori Fujishiro) Co-starring: Enako, Kokoro Shinozaki, Saki Miyamoto, Manatsu
- Natsu Kano Collection (August 23, 2021, Shonen Gahosha 〈YK PHOTO ALBUM〉, photography: Takanori Fujishiro) Other models: Enako, Kokoro Shinozaki, Saki Yoshida, Tsunko, Saki Miyamoto, Manatsu
- Netsu wa Mada Samezu (September 30, 2021, Shueisha 〈YJ PHOTO BOOK〉, photography: Takeo Dec.)
- Naisho-banashi Other Cut SPECIAL EDITION (October 5, 2021, Akita Shoten, photography: Takeo Dec.)
- Ouchi Halloween Shiyo. (October 15, 2021, Square Enix 〈Young Gangan Digital Photobook〉, photography: Tatsuya Ida)
- Biggest Surprise (December 17, 2021, Square Enix 〈Young Gangan Digital Photobook〉, photography: Takanori Fujishiro) Co-starring: Enako, Kokoro Shinozaki, Tsunko, Saki Miyamoto, Manatsu, Saki Yoshida
2022
- Fantasy o Ageru yo!! (February 10, 2022, Shueisha 〈YJ PHOTO BOOK〉, photography: Takanori Fujishiro) Co-starring: Enako, Kokoro Shinozaki, Tsunko, Manatsu
- Gundam LOVE (February 14, 2022, Shogakukan 〈Spi/Sun Gravure Photobook〉, photography: Takeo Dec.)
- PPE Girls Tora GIRLS Party (February 14, 2022, Shonen Gahosha 〈YK PHOTO ALBUM〉, photography: Takanori Fujishiro) Other models: Enako, Tsunko, Kokoro Shinozaki, Saki Miyamoto, Saki Yoshida, Minami Shinohara, Yokyun, Manatsu
- Momoiro no Hito (June 27, 2022, Shonen Gahosha 〈YK PHOTO ALBUM〉, photography: Masafumi Nakayama)
- JUNE PRIDE (June 27, 2022, Shogakukan 〈Spi/Sun Gravure Photobook〉, photography: Leslie Kee) Co-starring: Enako, Kokoro Shinozaki
- Iori Moe BEST I (November 1, 2022, Akita Shoten 〈Shu-Chan Digigra〉)
- 100-kai-me, Shiyo (November 10, 2022, Shueisha 〈YJ PHOTO BOOK〉, photography: Takeo Dec.)
- Moe na Kokoro no Yuwaku (November 30, 2022, Kobunsha 〈Platinum FLASH Digital Photobook〉, photography: LUCKMAN) Co-starring: Enako, Kokoro Shinozaki
- Moe-rashisa (November 30, 2022, Kobunsha 〈Platinum FLASH Digital Photobook〉, photography: Tatsuya Ida)
- Senshi Banko (December 6, 2022, Futabasha 〈Manga Action Digital Photobook〉, photography: Takanori Fujishiro) Co-starring: Kokoro Shinozaki, Saki Miyamoto
- Hiwa (December 12, 2022, Shonen Gahosha 〈YK PHOTO ALBUM〉, photography: Tatsuya Ida)
2023
- Holo Ranman (March 2, 2023, Shueisha 〈YJ PHOTO BOOK〉, photography: Takanori Fujishiro) Co-starring: Kokoro Shinozaki, Saki Miyamoto, Manatsu, Eiri
- Fetish (April 14, 2023, Kobunsha 〈FLASH Digital Photobook〉, photography: Takeshi Kozuka)
- Boku no Kanojo ga Saikou desu. (May 29, 2023, Hakusensha 〈Harem〉, photography: Tatsuya Ida)
- Moe First (June 1, 2023, Akita Shoten 〈Gekkan-Chan Digigra〉)
- Boku dake no. (June 5, 2023, Shueisha 〈Weekly Playboy PHOTO BOOK〉, photography: Kosuke Mae)
- Moe, Atsuru. (July 1, 2023, Akita Shoten 〈Young Champion Digigra〉)
- Yakusoku, Zutto. (July 24, 2023, Shonen Gahosha 〈YK PHOTO ALBUM〉, photography: Tatsuya Ida)
- Iori Moe BEST II (August 1, 2023, Akita Shoten 〈Shu-Chan Digigra〉)
- Miru Yume sae Amama (September 7, 2023, Shueisha 〈YJ PHOTO BOOK〉, photography: Takeo Dec.)
- Atsumare! PPE Party (September 22, 2023, Hakusensha 〈Animal Digital Photobook〉, photography: Takanori Fujishiro) Co-starring: Kokoro Shinozaki, Minami Shinohara, Saki Miyamoto, Eiri, Manatsu, Myako, Saki Yoshida, Yokyun
- Perfect Pretty Engaging Mermaid (September 22, 2023, Hakusensha 〈Animal Digital Photobook〉, photography: Takanori Fujishiro) Co-starring: Kokoro Shinozaki, Minami Shinohara, Saki Miyamoto, Eiri, Manatsu, Myako, Saki Yoshida, Yokyun
- #Osananajimi ni Kataomoi (October 27, 2023, Hakusensha 〈Animal Digital Photobook〉, photography: Tatsuya Ida)
- PPE Dai Undokai! (November 1, 2023, Akita Shoten 〈Gekkan-Chan Digigra〉)
- Yuwaku Shichau zo (November 8, 2023, Kodansha 〈FRIDAY Digital Photobook〉, photography: Yasuhisa Kikuchi)
- Senya Ichiya (December 24, 2023, Kobunsha 〈Platinum FLASH Digital Photobook〉, photography: Takeshi Okamoto)
- Ashita mo Kimi-iro. (December 29, 2023, Hakusensha 〈Harem〉, photography: Tatsuya Ida)
2024
- Lunchtime Travel (February 29, 2024, KADOKAWA)
- Evergreen (March 4, 2024, Shonen Gahosha 〈YK PHOTO ALBUM〉, photography: LUCKMAN)
- Nichi Nichi Moe Kojitsu (March 4, 2024, Shonen Gahosha 〈YK PHOTO ALBUM〉, photography: LUCKMAN) ※ DMM Books limited edition
- Love ga Afureru (July 25, 2024, Kodansha 〈FRIDAY Digital Photobook〉, photography: Yasutomo Sanpei)
- Boku shika Shiranai (August 27, 2024, Kobunsha 〈FLASH Digital Photobook〉, photography: Tomoki Kuwajima)
2025
- Ano Koro, Iori Moe to (March 11, 2025, Kobunsha 〈FLASH Digital Photobook〉, photography: Tomoki Kuwajima)
- Yan Maga Other-ssu! ＜YM 2025 No.4/5 Unpublished Cuts＞ (March 21, 2025, Kodansha 〈Yan Maga Digital Photobook〉, photography: Yasushi Nishimura)
- Ippaku Futsuka, Issho ni Iyou (April 1, 2025, Futabasha 〈Manga Action Digital Photobook〉, photography: Yasushi Nishimura)
- Taiwan Ryojou Nikki ~prologue~ (April 14, 2025, Shueisha 〈Weekly Playboy PHOTO BOOK〉, photography: Kazunori Fujimoto)
- Fetish Love (April 1, 2025, Akita Shoten 〈Young Champion Digigra〉)
- Shoka Hokaku Keikaku (May 2, 2025, Shogakukan 〈Spi/Sun Gravure Photobook〉, photography: Daisuke Sasaki)
- Iori Trip (December 2, 2025, Kobunsha 〈FLASH Digital Photobook〉, photography: Tomoki Kuwajima)
- Kasuka na Kyujitsu. (December 8, 2025, Shogakukan 〈Spi/Sun Gravure Photobook〉, photography: Akihito Saijo)
2026
- Psychedelic Glamorous (March 13, 2026, Fusosha 〈SPA! Digital Photobook〉, photography: Eiji Hikosaka)
- Kazemachi Jikan (July 17, 2026, Shogakukan 〈Spi/Sun Gravure Photobook〉, photography: Tomoo Kinoshita)
