= SpaceXAI =

American artificial intelligence subsidiary of SpaceX

SpaceX Super Intelligence LLC

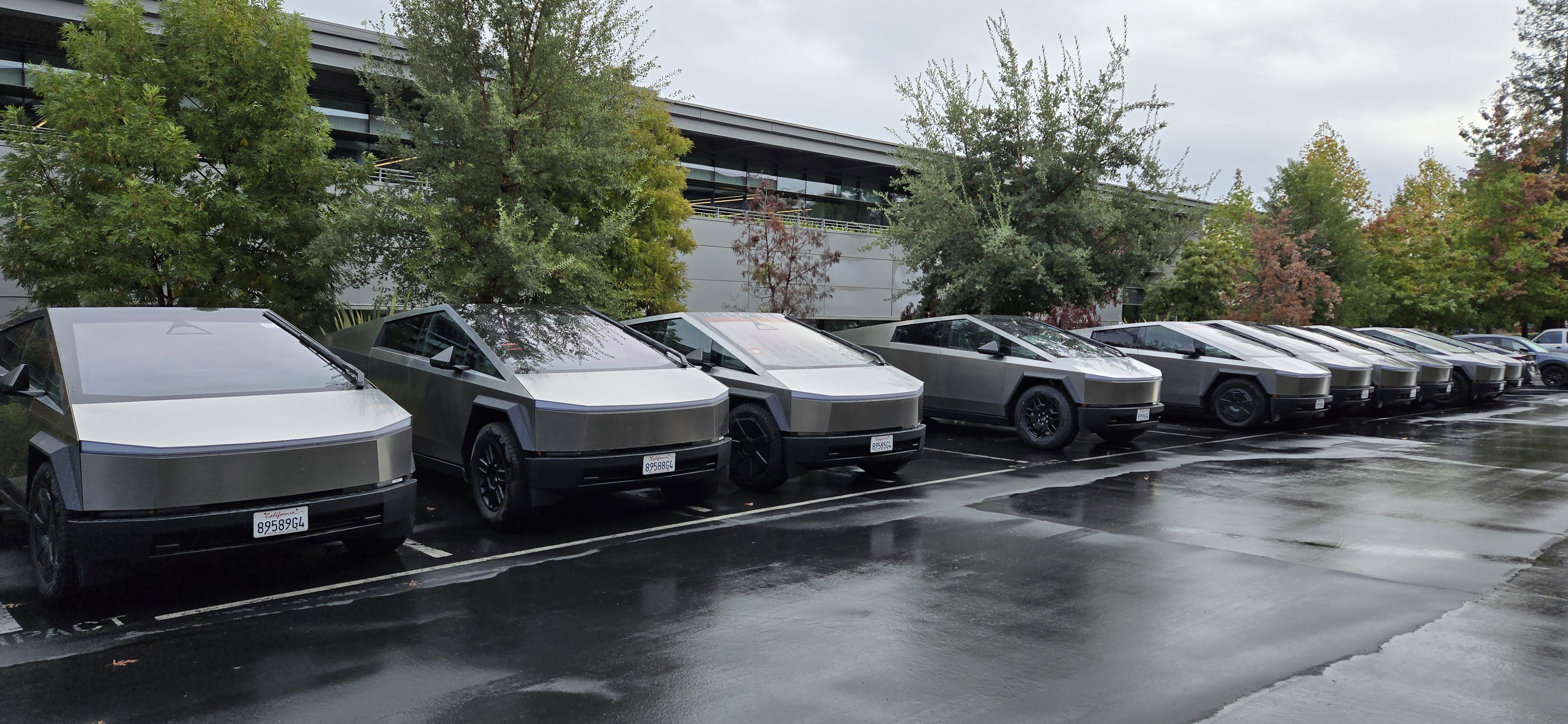
- Headquarters at 1450 Page Mill Road, Palo Alto, California
- Trade name: SpaceX Super Intelligence
- Formerly: X.AI Corp. (2023–2026); SpaceXAI LLC (2026)
- Type: Subsidiary
- Industry: Artificial intelligence Social media
- Founded: March 9, 2023; 3 years ago (Note: The company was incorporated on this date. It was not officially announced until July 12, 2023.)
- Founder: Elon Musk
- Headquarters: 1450 Page Mill Road, Stanford Research Park, Palo Alto, California, US; Bastrop, Texas, US
- Key people: Michael Nicolls (president); Michael Truell (CPO)
- Products: Cursor; Grok; Grokipedia; Grok Build; Grok Bot; X
- Revenue: ▲US$3.2 billion (2025)
- Operating income: ▼US$-6.4 billion (2025)
- Number of employees: 1,200+ (Note: Includes over 900 hourly paid AI tutors) (2025)
- Parent: SpaceX
- Subsidiaries: X Corp. Cursor
- Website: x.ai
- Footnotes; Financials as of December 31, 2025. References

SpaceX Super Intelligence LLC is an American artificial intelligence company founded by Elon Musk. In February 2026, it became a subsidiary of spaceflight company SpaceX, also founded by Musk. SpaceX Super Intelligence's primary products are the Grok family of language, image, and video models; via subsidiaries it operates the X social networking service and Cursor software development environment. The company is headquartered in Palo Alto, with offices in London.

The company was founded in March 2023 as xAI by Musk and 11 researchers, including Kyle Kosic, at the outset of the AI boom; Grok 1 was released that November. In March 2025, it was combined with X Corp., which owns the social network X, under X.AI Holdings Corp. In February 2026, xAI was acquired by SpaceX at a valuation of US$250 billion. It was rebranded as SpaceXAI in July, and in October, it became SpaceX Super Intelligence, in accordance with an executive order by President Donald Trump regarding the naming of AI. In April, SpaceX announced a partnership with AI coding company Cursor, acquiring it by August. In June, SpaceX made the largest initial public offering to date; 93% of its total addressable market forecast of $28.5 trillion was from AI business.

In Musk v. Altman, Musk stated Grok was partly developed via distillation from OpenAI models; in August 2026 OpenAI announced it would stop providing its models to Cursor, citing this and other contract violations by Musk's companies. Integrated with X, Grok has drawn controversies including for espousing Nazism and generating sexual deepfakes.

SpaceX Super Intelligence operates AI data centers, primarily its Colossus cluster; Customers include Anthropic, Google, and Reflection AI. Colossus has drawn controversy for pollution; in July 2026 Reuters reported that 59 natural gas turbines had been installed for Colossus 2 without federal air permits.

== History ==
=== Beginnings (2023–2025) ===
London office of SpaceXAI, 20 Air Street, Soho, opened in January 2025.

xAI logo (2023–2026)

Elon Musk founded xAI on March 9, 2023. The company's founding team of AI researchers were Jimmy Ba, Zihang Dai, Kyle Kosic, Manuel Kroiss, Ross Nordeen, Toby Pohlen, Christian Szegedy, Yuhuai Wu, Greg Yang, and Guodong Zhang, led by chief engineer Igor Babuschkin, formerly associated with Google DeepMind. Musk announced xAI on July 12, 2023.

xAI was initially incorporated in Nevada as a public-benefit corporation. By May 2024, it had dropped the public-benefit status. As of May 2026, xAI was headquartered in the San Francisco Bay Area.

In December 2023, Musk had Nvidia redirect 12,000 H100 chips that had been shipped for Tesla, Inc. to X, with X's later orders going to Tesla in exchange. On December 23, 2024, xAI raised US$6 billion in a private funding round supported by BlackRock, Fidelity, Sequoia Capital, and others, making its total funding to date over $12 billion. In January 2025, xAI opened a London office at 20 Air Street in the city's central Soho district. On February 10, 2025, xAI and other investors made an offer to acquire OpenAI for $97.4 billion. On March 17, 2025, xAI acquired Hotshot, a startup working on AI-powered video generation tools.

On March 28, 2025, Musk announced that xAI acquired sister company X Corp., the developer of social media platform X (formerly Twitter), which was previously acquired by Musk in October 2022. The deal, an all-stock transaction, valued X at $33 billion ($45 billion minus $12 billion debt). Meanwhile, xAI itself was valued at $80 billion. Both companies were combined into a single entity called X.AI Holdings Corp.

On July 14, 2025, the United States Department of Defense announced that xAI had received a $200 million contract for AI in the military. On September 12, xAI laid off 500 data annotation workers. The division, previously the company's largest, had worked to train Grok, xAI's chatbot. In October 2025, xAI moved into offices at 1450 Page Mill Road, Stanford Research Park, Palo Alto, across the road from Tesla Global Engineering Headquarters.

On December 30, 2025 xAI purchased a third building in Memphis, Tennessee, to increase its training capacity to nearly 2 gigawatts of compute power, and announced plans to expand its Colossus supercomputer to have at least 1 million graphics processing units.

=== Subsidiary of SpaceX, restructuring and rebranding (2026–present) ===
On February 2, 2026, SpaceX acquired xAI in an all-stock transaction that structured xAI as a wholly owned subsidiary of SpaceX. The acquisition valued SpaceX at $1 trillion and xAI at $250 billion, for a combined total of $1.25 trillion.

Later in February 2026, xAI laid off some employees as the company was restructured into four primary development teams. Around this time, half of the company's co-founders left. In early March 2026, two more co-founders, Guodong Zhang, head of xAI's Imagine team, and Zihang Dai, left, coinciding with an audit performed by SpaceX and Tesla, leaving only Musk and one other co-founder, Ross Nordeen, who left later in the month.

On April 10, 2026, xAI restructured its staff. Chief Financial Officer Anthony Armstrong departed the company and Michael Nicolls, vice president of SpaceX's Starlink, became xAI's president.

On April 21, 2026, xAI announced that it struck a deal with software company Cursor giving SpaceX the right to acquire the company for $60 billion later in 2026, or to pay $10 billion for work they are doing together. On June 16, 2026, SpaceX exercised the option and announced an all-stock acquisition of Cursor for $60 billion. The transaction closed on August 14, 2026. Cursor became a wholly owned subsidiary of SpaceX and joined the SpaceXAI team; outstanding Cursor shares were converted into SpaceX Class A common stock based on a $60 billion implied equity value.

The SpaceXAI logo that was briefly used in 2026.

In May 2026, Musk announced that xAI would cease to exist as a separate company, with Grok and X now being the AI division of SpaceX. In the same month, it laid off another 10 employees and restructured its Grok team.

On June 12, 2026, SpaceX made the largest initial public offering to date, at US$1.77 trillion. In its total addressable market forecast of $28.5 trillion, 93% was from xAI business.

In July 2026, xAI was rebranded as SpaceXAI.

On October 4, 2026, after United States President Donald Trump mandated federal agencies to use the term "super intelligence" to refer to AI, Musk posted "No more AI", followed by "SI" and "It's better". After an X user asked whether SpaceXAI could be renamed SpaceXSI, Musk replied, "Yes, we will make that change". The same day, SpaceXAI LLC filed a United States trademark application for SPACEXSI. On October 10, the company's official X account was renamed to SpaceX Super Intelligence and its handle was changed to @SpaceXSI. By October 13, the company's official website and legal terms used the SpaceXSI branding, while the legal name of the company remained as SpaceXAI LLC and the logo is simply SpaceX's standard logo.

== Data center operations ==
SpaceXSI operates a data center business centered on its Colossus cluster, the world's largest data center. Customers include Anthropic, Google, and Reflection AI.

In June 2024, the Greater Memphis Chamber announced xAI was planning on building Colossus in Memphis, Tennessee. After a 122-day construction period, the center went fully operational in December 2024. Local officials voiced concerns regarding the increased usage of electricity, 150 megawatts of power at peak, and while the agreement with the city was being worked out, the company deployed 14 VoltaGrid portable methane-gas powered generators.

=== Environmental impact ===
Environmental advocates said that the gas-burning turbines emit large amounts of air pollution, and that xAI was operating the turbines illegally, because it did not have the necessary permits. The New Yorker reported in May 2025, that thermal-imaging equipment used by volunteers flying over the site showed at least 33 generators producing heat, indicating that they were all running. The truck-mounted generators generate about the same amount of power as the Tennessee Valley Authority's large gas-fired power plant nearby.

In July 2025, the Shelby County Health Department granted xAI an air permit for the project. In November 2025, xAI announced plans to build a solar farm near Colossus with an estimated output of 30 megawatts of electricity, which is 10% of the data center's estimated power use.

The NAACP and other civil rights groups sued xAI in April 2026, alleging that the Colossus 2 data center was operating illegally because it did not have the necessary federal Clean Air Act permits. Reuters reporting in July found that xAI's Colossus 2 data center had 59 gas turbines with potential emissions that were "far beyond the threshold" that requires federal permits, in "predominantly Black communities already estimated to be suffering disproportionately high rates of lung disease".

== Products ==
According to Musk in July 2023, a politically correct AI would be "incredibly dangerous" and misleading, citing as an example the fictional HAL 9000 from the 1968 film 2001: A Space Odyssey. Musk instead said that xAI would be "maximally truth-seeking". Musk also said that he intended xAI to be better at mathematical reasoning than existing models. On November 4, 2023, xAI unveiled Grok, an AI chatbot that is integrated with X. xAI stated that when the bot is out of beta, it would only be available to X's Premium+ subscribers.

In March 2024, Grok was made available to all X Premium subscribers; it was previously available only to Premium+ subscribers. On March 17, 2024, xAI released Grok-1 as open source. On March 29, 2024, Grok-1.5 was announced, with "improved reasoning capabilities" and a context length of 128,000 tokens. On April 12, 2024, Grok-1.5 Vision (Grok-1.5V) was announced. On August 14, 2024, Grok-2 was made available to X Premium subscribers. It was the first Grok model with image generation capabilities.

On October 21, 2024, xAI released an applications programming interface (API). On December 9, 2024, xAI released a text-to-image model named Aurora. On February 17, 2025, xAI released Grok-3, which included a reflection feature. xAI also introduced a websearch function called DeepSearch. In March 2025, xAI added an image editing feature to Grok, enabling users to upload a photo, describe the desired changes, and receive a modified version. Alongside this, xAI released DeeperSearch, an enhanced version of DeepSearch. On July 9, 2025, xAI unveiled Grok-4. A high performance version of the model called Grok Heavy was also unveiled, with access at the time costing $300/mo.

On March 28, 2025, xAI acquired X Corp., the developer of the social media platform X. The platform was then integrated within xAI and became its second main product.

On July 8, 2025, xAI updated Grok's behavior on X coinciding with the release of Grok 4. During that day, Grok referred to itself as "MechaHitler", extensively praised Adolf Hitler, and made other antisemitic replies. Media outlets criticized the incident, and made comparisons to the Elon Musk salute controversy. Four days earlier Musk had announced, "We have improved @Grok significantly", in order to "fix" responses that he thought were too liberal, or "woke".

In August 2025, Musk announced Macrohard, an AI agent project intended to simulate software companies such as Microsoft; Business Insider reported in March 2026 that it had stalled.

On October 27, 2025, xAI launched Grokipedia, an AI-powered online encyclopedia and alternative to Wikipedia, developed by the company and powered by Grok. Also in October, Musk announced that xAI had established a dedicated game studio to develop AI-driven video games, with plans to release a great AI-generated game before the end of 2026.

From December 2025, Grok began generating sexual deepfakes of women and children, from users' prompting images. This led to a wave of lawsuits against the company, scrutiny from regulators around the world, and criticism from activist groups. In January 2026, X limited image generation through Grok replies on X to paying subscribers, though the feature remained free on Grok's standalone app and website.

Following the August 2026 close of the Cursor acquisition, SpaceXSI's products also include the Cursor AI coding agent and related tools (including Grok Build integration).

=== Distillation ===
In April 2026, during the Musk v. Altman trial, Musk said that xAI had "partly" used knowledge distillation from OpenAI models to develop Grok, and argued "generally AI companies distill other AI companies". In August 2026, OpenAI announced its intent to stop providing its models to the SpaceX-owned Cursor coding agent, citing "our experience with Elon Musk's companies violating contracts."

== Finance ==
In November 2023, Musk stated that "X Corp investors will own 25% of xAI". In December 2023, in a filing with the United States Securities and Exchange Commission, xAI revealed that it had raised $135 million in outside funding out of a total of up to $1 billion. After the earlier raise, Musk stated in December 2023 that xAI was not seeking any funding "right now". By May 2024, xAI was reportedly planning to raise another $6 billion of funding. Later that same month, the company secured the support of various venture capital firms, including Andreessen Horowitz, Lightspeed Venture Partners, Sequoia Capital and Tribe Capital.

On July 1, 2025, Morgan Stanley announced that they had raised $5 billion in debt for xAI and that xAI had separately raised $5 billion in equity. The debt consists of secured notes and term loans. Morgan Stanley took no stake in the debt. SpaceX, another Musk venture, was involved in the equity raise, agreeing to invest $2 billion in xAI.

=== Valuation ===
Transaction		Date	Amount raised (USD)			Valuation (USD)	
Transaction		Date	Equity	Debt	Total	Pre-money	Post-money
A	A		67M				
A	A-1		67M				
A	A (overall)	November 29, 2023	135M		135M		673M
B		May 26, 2024	6B		6B	18B	24B
C		December 23, 2024	6B		6B	44B	50B
Acquisition of X Corp.		March 28, 2025				80B	113B
Unknown		June 2025 (Note: Rumored; exact valuations not known.)	5B	5B	9.3B–10B		>120B
Acquired by SpaceX		February 2, 2026					250B
