= Colossus (data center) =

Supercomputer / data center cluster developed by xAI / SpaceXAI

Coordinates: 35°03′36″N 90°09′23″W

Colossus is the name used for a cluster of data centers developed by xAI (later SpaceX Super Intelligence) in the Memphis, Tennessee–Southaven, Mississippi area. The original facility, Colossus 1, began construction in 2024 at a former Electrolux plant in South Memphis and became operational in July–September 2024. Its primary purpose was to train the company's chatbot Grok.

A second major facility, Colossus 2 (also referred to as Macrohard), was developed beginning in 2025 in the Whitehaven area of Memphis, with associated power generation across the state line in Southaven, Mississippi. Additional nearby buildings (sometimes called Minihard and Macrohardrr / Colossus 3) expanded the cluster. As of mid-2026 the combined sites provided on the order of 1 gigawatt of AI compute capacity.

In May 2026 Anthropic agreed to rent essentially all compute capacity at Colossus 1. On June 5, 2026, Google agreed to rent access to approximately 110,000 GPUs from SpaceX beginning October 2026 through June 2029 for $920 million per month; the specific facility was not publicly identified by SpaceX.

== Colossus 1 ==
Colossus 1 was built in a former Electrolux factory in South Memphis. Construction of the initial cluster of approximately 100,000 Nvidia H100 GPUs was completed in 122 days; the system went live in mid-to-late 2024. Capacity was later expanded; Epoch AI estimates the site's chips now include about 150,000 H100s, 50,000 H200s and 30,000 B200s.

Local residents protested the turbines at public hearings over air quality, and the Shelby County Health Department issued a permit for 15 of them on July 2, 2025. The Southern Environmental Law Center, on behalf of the NAACP, notified xAI in June 2025 of its intent to sue under the Clean Air Act, alleging the company had installed dozens of turbines without permits.

== Colossus 2 and cluster expansion ==
In February 2025 an xAI affiliate purchased a large warehouse and adjacent parcels in Whitehaven, Memphis, for roughly $80 million. This became the core of Colossus 2 (branded Macrohard on the rooftop). The first major GPU cluster (~110,000 Nvidia GB200-class processors, ~210 MW) came online around January 2026 after a reported build of about 91 days; a subsequent cluster of GB300-class processors followed. By mid-2026 the site held on the order of 300,000–350,000+ GPUs and several hundred megawatts of IT load, with further expansion under way. By late September 2026, 440,000 GB300 GPUs were in use, with a further 660,000 GPUs expected to come online by the end of 2026.

Power for Colossus 2 and nearby buildings has relied heavily on a gas-turbine plant just across the state line in Southaven, Mississippi, on the former Duke Energy site on Stanton Road, owned by xAI subsidiary MZX Tech. Temporary/mobile turbines were installed and expanded (dozens of units, eventually reported in the 50–70 range), generating substantial NOx and other emissions. A permanent ~1.2 GW simple-cycle plant (41 turbines) received a Mississippi Prevention of Significant Deterioration permit in March 2026; temporary units were scheduled for phased removal as the permanent plant came online (target completion of removal by mid-2027 under a 2026 agreement with state regulators).

== Environmental impact and community response ==
In April 2026 the NAACP, represented by the Southern Environmental Law Center and Earthjustice, sued xAI / MZX Tech in federal court in Mississippi, alleging operation of the Southaven "Colossus Gas Plant" without required Clean Air Act permits and disproportionate impact on nearby Black communities. The suit sought injunctions and penalties. In June 2026 the U.S. Department of Justice under the second Trump administration moved to intervene and dismiss the case, arguing it threatened national, economic, and energy security (including support for military use of AI). Temporary turbines continued to operate while a permanent plant was built; a 2026 agreed order with Mississippi regulators set a timeline for their removal by July 2027.

== See also ==
- List of the top supercomputers in the United States
- SpaceXAI
- Grok (chatbot)
- Environmental impact of artificial intelligence
