= List of proprietary artificial intelligence software =

This is a list of proprietary artificial intelligence software, which is proprietary software used for artificial intelligence (AI), including chatbots, generative artificial intelligence, machine learning, natural language processing, computer vision, speech synthesis, and AI-assisted software development, and is in contrast to open-source artificial intelligence software.

== AI assistants and chatbots ==
=== Text-based ===
- Character.ai
- ChatGPT
- Claude
- Google Gemini
- Grok
- Meta AI
- Microsoft Copilot
- Perplexity AI
- Poe
- Replika

=== Voice-based ===
- Amazon Alexa
- Google Assistant
- Siri

== Large language models ==
- Chinchilla
- Claude
- GLM 5.3
- Gemini
- GPT-3
- GPT-4
- GPT-4o
- GPT-5
- GPT-5.3-Codex
- LaMDA
- Muse Spark
- OpenAI o1
- PaLM
- Wu Dao

== LLM inference software ==
- LM Studio

== AI model routing and API platforms ==
- OpenRouter

== AI-assisted software development ==
- Amazon Q
- Amp
- Claude Code
- Cody
- Codex
- Cursor
- Devin AI
- GitHub Copilot
- Replit
- Tabnine

== AI agents ==
- Manus
- OpenAI Operator

== Image generation and editing ==
- Adobe Firefly
- DALL-E
- Ideogram
- Imagen
- Leonardo.ai
- Midjourney
- Recraft

== Video generation ==
- Dream Machine
- HeyGen
- Runway
- Sora
- Synthesia
- Veo

== Speech and audio ==
- ElevenLabs

=== Music generation ===
- AIVA
- Suno AI
- Udio

== Writing and language ==
- DeepL Translator
- Grammarly
- QuillBot

== Search and research ==
- Glean
- Google AI Overviews
- NotebookLM

== Machine learning platforms ==
- Amazon SageMaker
- Azure Machine Learning
- Google Cloud Vertex AI
- IBM Watsonx
- MATLAB

== Computer vision ==
- Amazon Rekognition
- Google Cloud Vision API

== Autonomous vehicles ==
- Cruise (autonomous vehicle)
- Tesla Autopilot
- Waymo

== Legal ==
- Harvey

== Game-playing systems ==
- AlphaGo
- AlphaStar
- Pluribus
- Watson

== See also ==
- Applications of artificial intelligence
- Comparison of deep learning software
- List of artificial intelligence algorithms
- List of artificial intelligence projects
- Lists of open-source artificial intelligence software
- Open weights
