= List of AI-assisted software development tools =

List of software tools for AI-assisted software development

This is a list of AI-assisted software development tools which are tools used for AI-assisted software development, especially large language models and AI agents, to assist with software development tasks such as writing, editing, reviewing, testing, debugging, documenting, and understanding source code.

== AI software development tools ==
Tool	Developer	License	IDE	IDE extension	Web application	Desktop application	Mobile application	CLI
Amp	Amp Frontier Corporation (originally Sourcegraph)	Proprietary	No	No	?	No	?	Yes
Amazon Q Developer	Amazon Web Services	Proprietary	No	Yes	?	No	?	Yes
Bob	IBM	Proprietary	Yes	Yes	No	No	?	Yes
ChatGPT	OpenAI	Proprietary	No	No	Yes	Yes	Yes	No
Claude Code	Anthropic	Proprietary	No	Yes	Yes	Yes	Yes	Yes
Cline	Cline	Apache 2.0	No	Yes	No	No	?	Yes
Codex	OpenAI	Proprietary	No	Yes	No	Yes	Yes	No
Codex CLI	OpenAI	Apache 2.0	No	No	No	No	Yes	Yes
Cody	Sourcegraph	Proprietary	No	Yes	?	No	?	Yes
Command Code	Command Code AI	Apache 2.0	No	No	No	Yes	No	Yes
Crush	Charm	Functional Source License / MIT	No	No	No	No	?	Yes
Cursor	Anysphere	Proprietary	Native	No	Yes	Yes	Yes	Yes
DeepSeek Harness	DeepSeek	MIT	No	No	Yes	No	Yes	Yes
Devin AI	Cognition AI	Proprietary	No	Yes	Yes	No	?	Yes
Gemini	Google	Proprietary	No	Yes	Yes	Yes	Yes	Yes
GitHub Copilot	GitHub and OpenAI	Proprietary	No	Yes	Yes	No	Yes	Yes
Google AI Studio	Google	Proprietary	Online	No	Yes	No	No	No
Google Antigravity	Google	Proprietary	Native	No	No	Yes	No	Yes
goose	Agentic AI Foundation (originally Block)	Apache 2.0	No	Yes	No	Yes	Yes	Yes
Grok	SpaceXAI	Proprietary	No	Yes	Yes	No	Yes	No
Hermes Agent	Nous Research	MIT	No	Yes	?	No	Yes	Yes
Kilo Code	Anaconda	MIT	No	Yes	No	No	Yes	Yes
Kimi Code	Moonshot AI	MIT	No	?	No	Yes	Yes	Yes
Maki	Tony Solomonik	MIT	No	No	No	No	?	Yes
Muse Code	Meta	Proprietary	No	No	No	No	?	Yes
OpenCode	Anomaly Innovations	MIT	No	Yes	Yes	Yes	Yes	Yes
OpenHands	All Hands AI	MIT	No	Yes	Yes	No	?	Yes
Pi	Earendil	MIT	No	No	No	No	Yes	Yes
Oh My Pi	Stencil Labs	MIT	No	No	No	No	Yes	Yes
Qodo	Qodo	Proprietary	No	Yes	?	No	?	Yes
Rovik IDE	Anton Piliugin	MIT	Yes	No	No	Yes	No	No
Tabnine	Tabnine	Proprietary	No	Yes	No	No	?	Yes
toPrompt	The NineHertz	Proprietary	No	No	Yes	No	No	No
Warp	Warp	AGPL-3.0 (client), MIT (UI framework)	No	No	Yes	Yes	No	Yes
ZCode	Z.AI	Apache 2.0	No	No	No	Yes	Yes	No
Zed Agent	Zed Industries	GPLv3	Native	No	No	Yes	No	No
Tool	Developer	License	IDE	IDE extension	Web application	Desktop application	Mobile application	CLI

== See also ==
- Agent harness
- AlphaDev – DeepMind AI system for discovering improved computer algorithms such as faster sorting algorithms and hashing
- AlphaEvolve – AI software agent for designing advanced algorithms
- List of chatbots
- List of LLMs
- List of open-source agentic AI agents
- List of integrated development environments
- Lists of programming software development tools
- LiteLLM — open-source LLM gateway
- OpenRouter — LLM gateway for accessing and routing requests to 400+ LLMs and other generative AI models
- Reverse Engineer Anything
- Software development tool
- Strix — open-source application security and penetration testing software using AI agents
- Theia AI — open-source framework for integrating LLMs into development tools and IDEs.
- Vibe coding
