= Eclipse Theia =

Open-source framework for building IDEs

- Developers: EclipseSource, Ericsson, Red Hat, STMicroelectronics, TypeFox
- Release: March 2017; 9 years ago
- Stable release: 1.70 / 16 April 2026; 5 months ago
- Written in: TypeScript
- Type: Programming tool, integrated development environment
- License: Eclipse Public License 2.0 (EPL2) or GNU General Public License, version 2 (GPLv2) with the classpath exception
- Website: theia-ide.org
- Repository: github.com/eclipse-theia

Eclipse Theia is an Eclipse open source project providing the Theia Platform and the Theia IDE.

The Eclipse Theia Platform is a free and open-source framework for building IDEs and tools based on web technologies. Theia-based applications can be deployed as desktop and web applications. It is implemented in TypeScript and emphasizes extensibility.

With Theia AI, the platform provides explicit support for building tools and IDEs with artificial intelligence (AI) capabilities.

The Eclipse Theia IDE is an IDE for desktop devices and the cloud based on the Theia platform, an open alternative to Visual Studio Code. It features a highly customizable developer experience and uses Theia AI to support AI features (also referred to as the AI-powered Theia IDE, an open alternative to GitHub Copilot or Cursor). The AI-powered Theia IDE includes Theia Coder, an open, adaptable and transparent AI coding assistant and integrates the Model Context Protocol (MCP) and Claude Code.

While Eclipse Theia incorporates certain components from Visual Studio Code, such as the Monaco editor, it is independently developed with a modular architecture and is not a fork of VS Code.

== History ==
Theia was originally developed by TypeFox and Ericsson, and continually receives contributions from EclipseSource, Red Hat, IBM, Google, Arm Holdings as well as from individual contributors. It was first launched in March 2017. Since May 2018, Theia has been a project of the Eclipse Foundation. Eclipse Theia is now considered to be the next generation Eclipse Platform for tools and IDEs.

== About ==
Theia is built on the Language Server Protocol (LSP) and supports a variety of programming languages. It can be used as a desktop application, a web application, or a hybrid application with separate front and back ends. All of Theia's features are implemented as extensions, which allows third-party developers to modify Theia's functionality by using the same application programming interfaces (APIs) as the application's default components. Theia's layout consists of draggable docks. Theia is compatible with Visual Studio Code extensions.

Theia is a free and open-source software project under the Eclipse Foundation and is licensed under the Eclipse Public License 2.0 (EPL2).

== Reception ==
The Theia platform serves as the foundation for IDEs and domain-specific tools across a range of industries and use cases, including embedded development (e.g., the Arduino IDE 2.0, Texas Instruments' Code Composer Studio and STMicroelectronics' STM32CubeMX2), GPU profiling (e.g., Samsung's Sokatoa), industrial automation, cloud-based education platforms, and enterprise engineering environments.

In January 2019, JAXenter, a website and blog about coding, ranked Theia as the third-most popular JavaScript integrated development environment of 2018 according to GitHub metrics, behind Visual Studio Code and Atom.

In 2025, Theia AI won the CODiE Award for Best Open-Source Development Tool.

== See also ==
- Eclipse (software)
- List of integrated development environments
