= GitHub Copilot =

Artificial intelligence tool

- Logo
- Developers: GitHub; OpenAI
- Release: October 2021; 5 years ago
- Stable release: 1.7.4421
- Operating system: Microsoft Windows, Linux, macOS, Web
- License: MIT (extension); Proprietary (app)
- Website: github.com/features/copilot/

GitHub Copilot is a code completion and programming AI-assistant developed by GitHub and OpenAI that assists users of Visual Studio Code, Visual Studio, Neovim, Eclipse and JetBrains integrated development environments (IDEs) by autocompleting code. Currently available by subscription to individual developers and to businesses, the generative AI software was first announced by GitHub on 29 June 2021. Users can choose the large language model used for generation.

== History ==
On 29 June 2021, GitHub announced GitHub Copilot for technical preview in the Visual Studio Code development environment. GitHub Copilot was released as a plugin on the JetBrains marketplace on 29 October 2021. On 27 October 2021, GitHub released the GitHub Copilot Neovim plugin as a public repository. GitHub announced Copilot's availability for the Visual Studio 2022 IDE on 29 March 2022. On 21 June 2022, GitHub announced that Copilot was out of "technical preview", and is available as a subscription-based service for individual developers.

GitHub Copilot is the evolution of the "Bing Code Search" plugin for Visual Studio 2013, which was a Microsoft Research project released in February 2014. This plugin integrated with various sources, including MSDN and Stack Overflow, to provide high-quality contextually relevant code snippets in response to natural language queries.

== Features ==
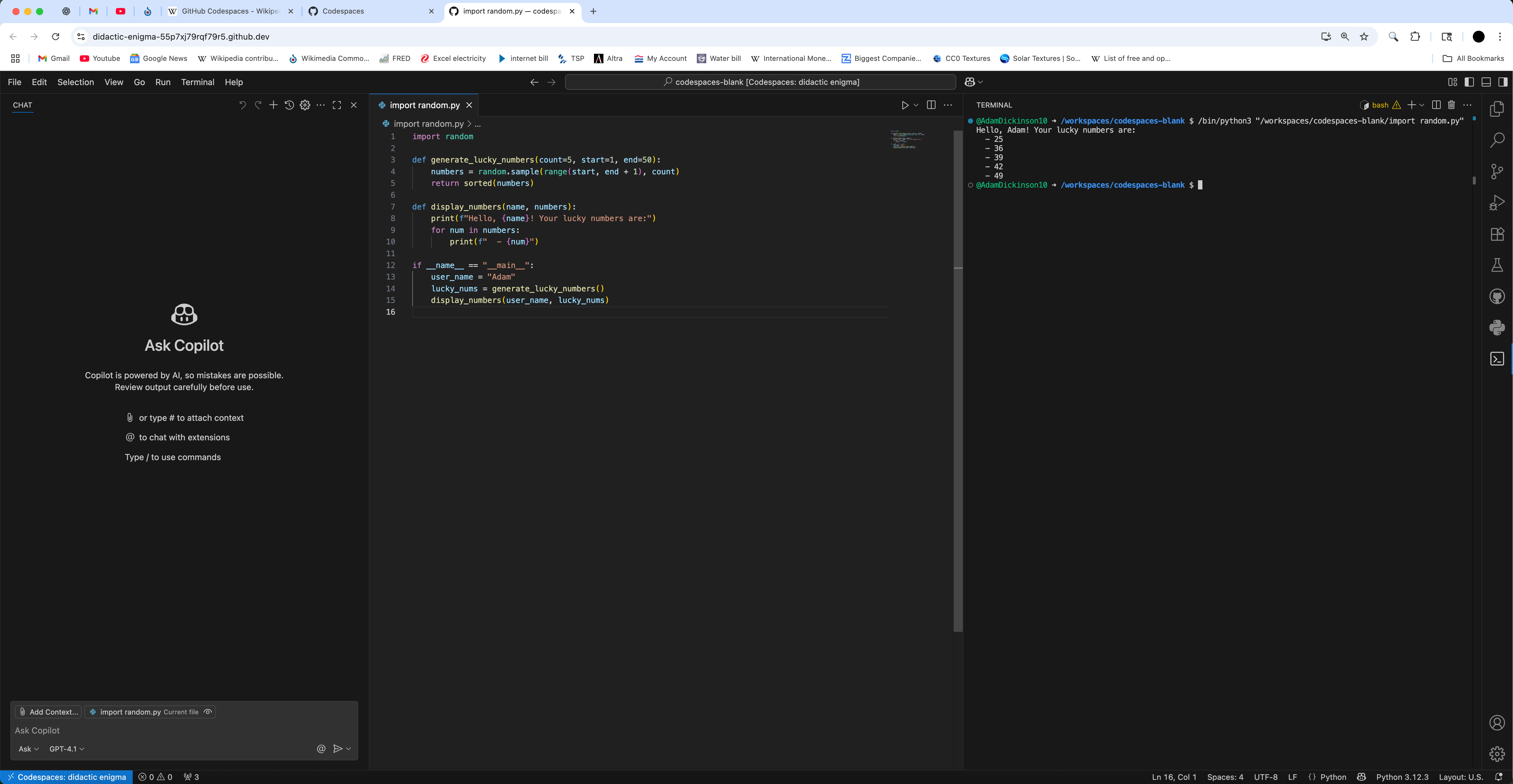
GitHub Codespaces layout GitHub Copilot on the left Code editor in center Terminal on the right

When provided with a programming problem in natural language, Copilot is capable of generating solution code. It is also able to describe input code in English and translate code between programming languages.

Copilot enables developers to choose between multiple large language models (LLMs), including OpenAI's GPT models, Anthropic's Claude, xAI's Grok, and Google's Gemini.

According to its website, GitHub Copilot includes assistive features for programmers, such as the conversion of code comments to runnable code, and autocomplete for chunks of code, repetitive sections of code, and entire methods and/or functions. GitHub reports that Copilot's autocomplete feature is accurate roughly half of the time; with some Python function header code, for example, Copilot correctly autocompleted the rest of the function body code 43% of the time on the first try and 57% of the time after ten attempts.

GitHub states that Copilot's features allow programmers to navigate unfamiliar coding frameworks and languages by reducing the amount of time users spend reading documentation.

== Implementation ==
GitHub Copilot was initially powered by the OpenAI Codex, which is a modified, production version of GPT-3. The Codex model is additionally trained on gigabytes of source code in a dozen programming languages. Copilot's OpenAI Codex was trained on a selection of the English language, public GitHub repositories, and other publicly available source code. This includes a filtered dataset of 159 gigabytes of Python code sourced from 54 million public GitHub repositories. OpenAI's GPT-3 is licensed exclusively to Microsoft, GitHub's parent company.

In November 2023, Copilot Chat was updated to use OpenAI's GPT-4 model. In 2024, Copilot began allowing users to choose between different large language models, including Gemini and Claude.

On 6 February 2025, GitHub announced "agent mode", which is a more autonomous mode of operation for the Copilot. Given a programming task, it attempts to accomplish it by executing commands on a Visual Studio instance on the user's computer. The agent mode can connect to different LLMs, including GPT-4o, o1, o3-mini, Claude 3.5 Sonnet, and Gemini 2.0 Flash.

On 17 May 2025, GitHub announced "coding agent", which is a more autonomous mode of operation for the Copilot. The user would assign a task or issue to Copilot, which would then initialize a development environment in the cloud (powered by GitHub Actions) and perform the request. It would compose a draft pull request and pushes commits to the draft as it works. After accomplishing the request, it tags the user for code review. It is essentially an asynchronous version of agent mode.

== Reception ==
Since Copilot's release, there have been concerns with its security and educational impact, as well as licensing controversy surrounding the code it produces.

=== Licensing controversy ===
While GitHub CEO Nat Friedman stated in June 2021 that "training ML systems on public data is fair use", a class-action lawsuit filed in November 2022 called this "pure speculation", asserting that "no Court has considered the question of whether 'training ML systems on public data is fair use.'" The lawsuit from Joseph Saveri Law Firm, LLP challenges the legality of Copilot on several claims, ranging from breach of contract with GitHub's users, to breach of privacy under the CCPA for sharing PII.

GitHub admits that a small proportion of the tool's output may be copied verbatim, which has led to fears that the output code is insufficiently transformative to be classified as fair use and may infringe on the copyright of the original owner. In June 2022, the Software Freedom Conservancy announced it would end all uses of GitHub in its own projects, accusing Copilot of ignoring code licenses used in training data. In a customer-support message, GitHub stated that "training machine learning models on publicly available data is considered fair use across the machine learning community", but the class action lawsuit called this "false" and additionally noted that "regardless of this concept's level of acceptance in 'the machine learning community,' under Federal law, it is illegal".

On 16 September 2026, the United States Court of Appeals for the Ninth Circuit upheld the dismissal of the plaintiffs' claims under the Digital Millennium Copyright Act (DMCA). The court held that the plaintiffs had not shown that GitHub Copilot and OpenAI's Codex removed or altered copyright management information from existing works, reasoning that the systems generated new works that did not contain such information. The ruling did not resolve the plaintiffs' separate claims that the defendants had breached open-source licensing terms.

=== Privacy concerns ===
The Copilot service is cloud-based and requires continuous communication with the GitHub Copilot servers. This opaque architecture has fueled concerns over telemetry and data mining of individual keystrokes.

In late 2022 GitHub Copilot has been accused of emitting Quake game source code, with no author attribution or license.

== See also ==
- Tabnine
- Devstral
- Cursor (code editor)
- Devin AI
- Generative AI
- List of AI-assisted software development tools
- List of chatbots
- Microsoft Copilot
- Code completion
- Vibe coding
