= A2A (disambiguation) =

A2A is an Italian company.

A2A may also refer to:

- Adenosine A_{2A} receptor
- Agent2Agent – Open protocol for communication between AI agents
- Alaska-Alberta Railway Development Corporation (A2A Rail)
- Algonquin to Adirondacks Collaborative (A2A)
- A2A radio transmission mode; see Types of radio emissions#Low-speed data
- UK Access to Archives (A2A) programme; see The National Archives (United Kingdom)#"Access to Archives"
