= Tom Brown (AI) =

Co-founder of Anthropic

- Born: 1986 or 1987 (age 39–40)
- Education: Massachusetts Institute of Technology
- Occupations: Co-founder and chief compute officer of Anthropic
- Known for: Co-founding Anthropic

Tom Brown is one of the seven co-founders of Anthropic, the company behind Claude AI. He is one of the technical figures behind the development of modern large language models.

== Education ==
Brown graduated from the Massachusetts Institute of Technology in 2010 with a Master of Engineering degree.
