= Google Antigravity =

AI-assisted software development platform by Google

- The Antigravity editor with the agent side panel open
- Developer: Google
- Release: November 18, 2025; 11 months ago
- Stable release: 2.31.0 (Antigravity 2.0) / November 9, 2026; 1 day ago; 2.6.0 (Antigravity IDE) / October 26, 2026; 15 days ago
- Operating system: Windows 10 or later, macOS Monterey or later, Linux
- Platform: x86-64, ARM64
- Type: Integrated development environment, command-line interface, software development kit
- License: Proprietary
- Website: antigravity.google

Google Antigravity is a software development platform from Google in which artificial intelligence (AI) agents write, run and test code with varying degrees of autonomy. It was released on November 18, 2025, alongside the Gemini 3 model, as an integrated development environment (IDE) that developers found to be derived from Visual Studio Code (VS Code). In May 2026, Google added Antigravity 2.0, a standalone desktop application for managing agents, together with a command-line interface (CLI) and a software development kit (SDK). The original editor continues as a separate product, the Antigravity IDE.

Antigravity uses Google's Gemini models and also offers models from Anthropic and OpenAI. It can be used free of charge within usage limits, which are higher for subscribers to Google's paid AI plans. Its launch prompted debate over whether it was a fork of VS Code or of Windsurf, an AI code editor whose technology Google had licensed earlier in 2025. In the months after launch, security researchers reported several vulnerabilities; Google responded with a stricter security mode, sandboxing for agent commands, and fixes for reported flaws.

== History ==
=== Background ===
In July 2025, Google hired Varun Mohan, the chief executive of the AI coding startup Windsurf, along with co-founder Douglas Chen and several researchers, and paid $2.4 billion to license Windsurf's technology. The rest of Windsurf was acquired days later by Cognition AI. Mohan joined Google DeepMind as a director of software engineering and co-authored Google's announcement of Antigravity 2.0 in 2026.

=== Launch ===
Google announced Antigravity on November 18, 2025, the day it released Gemini 3, and made it available the same day as a free public preview for Windows, macOS and Linux. Google described it as an "agent-first" platform and offered "generous rate limits" on Gemini 3 Pro, which refreshed every five hours. Anthropic's Claude Sonnet 4.5 and OpenAI's open-weight GPT-OSS model were also available.

The announcement did not say what code Antigravity was built on. Developers who examined it concluded that it was derived from VS Code, and some found references to Cascade, Windsurf's proprietary agent system, suggesting that it might derive from Windsurf, itself a VS Code fork.

=== Early updates ===
In December 2025, Google raised the rate limits for Google AI Pro and Ultra subscribers and moved free users to a weekly limit. After security researchers reported flaws in the software, Google added an optional "Secure Mode" on December 8, 2025, in which the agent's actions require human review; it was renamed "strict mode" in February 2026. Between January and March 2026, Google added the option to run the agent's terminal commands in a sandbox on macOS and Linux. Gemini 3 Flash became available in Antigravity in December 2025, and Gemini 3.1 Pro in February 2026.

In February 2026, Google cut off users who had connected the third-party agent OpenClaw to Antigravity's backend, citing "a massive increase in malicious usage of the Antigravity backend that has tremendously degraded the quality of service". It later added a process for suspended accounts to request reinstatement.

=== Antigravity 2.0 ===
At Google I/O on May 19, 2026, Google released Antigravity 2.0, a standalone desktop application in which users can run several agents in parallel, define custom subagent workflows, and schedule tasks to run in the background. Google's documentation describes it as the successor to the original release's Agent Manager that, unlike the Agent Manager, "functions independently of an IDE". Google also released the Antigravity CLI, which replaced its earlier Gemini CLI for consumers, and the Antigravity SDK.

The original application, which Google now calls "Antigravity 1.0", was relaunched at the same time as a separate product, the Antigravity IDE, with its version numbering restarted at 2.0.1 and a tool for importing settings, extensions and keybindings from Antigravity 1.0. As of October 2026, the IDE is not supported for enterprise customers, and its most recent release was in August 2026, while the desktop application and the CLI continued to receive frequent updates.

== Products ==
As of October 2026, Antigravity is offered in the following forms:

- Antigravity 2.0, a desktop application for starting, monitoring and coordinating agents, for Windows, macOS and Linux, and for Googlebook devices through Google Play
- Antigravity IDE, the original VS Code–based editor
- Antigravity CLI, a terminal application written in Go
- Antigravity SDK, a Python library for building custom agents that developers can host on their own infrastructure
- extensions that add Antigravity's agent to Visual Studio Code, Visual Studio, JetBrains IDEs, Zed and Xcode

== Features ==
As released in 2025, Antigravity had two main views: an editor view, a conventional IDE with code completion and an agent in a side panel; and a manager view, the Agent Manager, from which users could start several agents working asynchronously across different workspaces. Agents can use the code editor, a terminal and a built-in web browser based on Chrome.

Agents produce what Google calls "Artifacts", such as task lists, implementation plans, walkthroughs, screenshots and browser recordings, which Google says let users check an agent's work without reviewing each individual action. Agents also read from and add to a knowledge base, which Google says lets them learn from earlier work.

Users can set how much an agent does without supervision. In "Turbo" mode, an agent runs terminal commands without asking for approval; in strict mode, it needs approval for its actions and runs commands in a sandbox with restricted network access.

=== AI models ===
Antigravity was built around Google's Gemini models. As of October 2026, its model selector includes Gemini 3.1 Pro and several Gemini Flash models, Anthropic's Claude Opus and Sonnet models in versions 4.6 and 5.5, and OpenAI's GPT-OSS-120B. Availability depends on the user's plan; the Claude 5.5 models are limited to paying Google AI Pro and Ultra subscribers. Google has said that the Claude 4.6 models will be removed on November 2, 2026.

== Pricing ==
Antigravity has no subscription of its own. Individuals can use it free of charge with a usage quota that refreshes weekly, while subscribers to Google AI Pro and Google AI Ultra receive larger quotas that refresh every five hours and can buy credits for additional use. With the release of Antigravity 2.0, Google introduced a $100-per-month Ultra plan with five times the Antigravity usage limits of the Pro plan, and lowered the price of its top Ultra plan from $250 to $200 per month. Since mid-2026, organizations have been able to use Antigravity 2.0 and the CLI with Gemini Enterprise accounts.

== Reception ==
Antigravity's launch prompted discussion among developers about the number of AI code editors built on VS Code; a Hacker News thread about it drew more than 1,000 comments. Developers posted comparisons with VS Code and Windsurf, and some criticized Google for not disclosing what Antigravity was based on, calling it a "PORK", or "proprietary fork".

In a review the day after launch, Tim Anderson of DevClass reported that one user had run out of free quota after about 20 minutes, with no way to buy more, and that the review's own sessions failed with errors attributed to "model provider overload".

== Security and reliability ==
Within days of the launch, security researchers reported several vulnerabilities. Aaron Portnoy of the security firm Mindgard found that a malicious source code repository could install a persistent backdoor, and other researchers described indirect prompt injection attacks that could exfiltrate data or run commands. Google said it took security issues "very seriously" and would publish known issues while working on fixes. In April 2026, Pillar Security disclosed a prompt injection flaw in the agent's file-search tool that allowed arbitrary code execution even in the product's most restrictive security mode. It had reported the flaw to Google in January; Google fixed it on February 28, 2026, and paid a bug bounty.

In December 2025, a user in Greece reported that Antigravity, running in Turbo mode, had erased an entire drive after being asked to clear a project's cache. The agent's command targeted the root of the drive instead of the project folder and bypassed the Recycle Bin, so the files could not be recovered. A Google spokesperson told The Register: "We take these issues seriously. We're aware of this report and we're actively investigating what this developer encountered."

== See also ==
- List of AI-assisted software development tools
