= Amazon Bedrock =

Cloud-based generative artificial intelligence service

- Developer: Amazon Web Services
- Initial release: 2023; 3 years ago
- Type: Platform as a service
- License: Proprietary
- Website: aws.amazon.com/bedrock/

Amazon Bedrock is a cloud computing service provided by Amazon Web Services (AWS) for building generative artificial intelligence applications. Launched in 2023, the platform provides a unified API to access foundation models (FMs) from several AI companies, alongside related tools.

Bedrock is a serverless computing service which competes with similar enterprise AI platforms such as Microsoft Foundry and Google Cloud Platform.

== History ==
Amazon announced Bedrock on April 13, 2023. The service became generally available on September 28, 2023. Throughout 2024 and 2025, AWS expanded the service to include AI agents, which allow models to interact with external systems.

== Features ==
- Knowledge Bases: a managed workflow for Retrieval-Augmented Generation (RAG), which allows models to pull facts from private data stored in Amazon S3.
- Guardrails: a security feature that allows administrators to set content filters and personally identifiable information redaction across all models in the platform to increase the safety and compliance of AI deployments.

== PartyRock ==
In November 2023, Amazon launched PartyRock, a web-based no-code environment for building generative AI applications. The platform uses a natural language interface to translate user descriptions into software widgets. These widgets enable specific AI behaviors, including text-based prompts, conversational agents, generating images, and the summarization and querying of user-uploaded documents.

Although it initially launched with a limited-time free trial, AWS transitioned the service to a recurring free daily usage credit model in early 2025.

== See also ==
- Amazon Q
