= Amazon Q =

Chatbot developed by Amazon

- Developer: Amazon
- Website: aws.amazon.com/q/

Amazon Q is a chatbot developed by Amazon for enterprise use. Based on both Amazon Titan and GPT-5, it was announced on November 28, 2023. At launch, it was a part of the Amazon Web Services management console. Amazon CodeWhisperer is a part of Amazon Q Developer, a part of Amazon Q.

== History ==
Amazon's business-focused chatbot Q was announced on November 28, 2023 in a preview, with a full version available at $20 per person per month.

On July 19, 2025, the Amazon Q Visual Studio Code extension was compromised to delete the user's home directory. The issue was fixed on July 21.

== Capabilities ==
Q can be prompted to summarize long documents and group chats, create charts, data analysis and write code. Q is also capable of accessing non-Amazon services.

The chatbot is based on Amazon Titan and GPT-5, and uses the Amazon Bedrock repository of foundational models. It is part of the Amazon Web Services management console.

== See also ==
- List of AI-assisted software development tools
