= Agent experience =

Agent experience (AX) is the design of digital environments in which AI agents can understand, navigate, and act effectively. The term can also refer to the appearance and affordances of an environment from a machine-user's point of view. In other words, the experience AI agents have as users of platforms and products; in this sense it has a close parallel with user experience (UX). Less often, the term spans the experience of collaborating with AI agents from the human perspective.

== History ==
Since its inception in the 1960s, software engineering had focussed its development of user interfaces (UI) largely for the benefit of humans. Rudimentary precursors to APIs had existed from the 1940s, but these represent a deterministic machine orientated interface separate from the UI. Screen scrapers and other forms of Robotic process automation had been in use since at least the early 1990s, but these were examples of the human UI being used in ways unintended by the original designers, sometimes due to those original developers having moved on by the time a requirement for automation arose, making it too expensive to create APIs that would have made screen scraping unnecessary. From 2023, a new type of user began to arrive at scale - LLMs operating as an agent. Unlike earlier programmes running screen scrapers in wholly deterministic ways, AI agents possess reasoning ability and autonomy. With the prevalence of AI agents growing rapidly (Note: When the "agent experience" concept was being formulated in 2024, it was already predicted that AI agents would soon outnumber human users. By mid 2026 evidence from Cloudflare suggested bots (albeit some deterministic rather than AI agents) already outnumber human internet users , with predictions now estimating that 90% of B2B transactions (approx $15 trillion worth) will be conducted by AI agents as early as 2028.) in 2024, sources began to discuss "agent experience" as it relates to AI systems.

== Terminology ==
In 2025 and later the term "agent experience" is frequently used to refer to the practice of ensuring AI agents work correctly with ones technology. Depending on context, the term is also often used to refer to the experience of interacting with technologies from the AI agent's perspective. In technology related sources dating from 2023 and earlier, the term more frequently referred to experience of human customer service agents in a call centre - this meaning is still sometimes intended even in 2026. Yet another meaning for "agent experience" is to refer to the experience of interacting with AI agents from a human's point of view.

=== Etymology ===
An early use of the term 'agent experience' in relation to designing for effective machine-user interactions was by Pablo Romeo, co-founder and CTO of CloudX, in 2024. The term rapidly grew in popularity among tech journalists, bloggers and the IT industry after it was highlighted by Mathias Biilmann, co-founder and chief executive of Netlify, in his January 2025 essay "Introducing AX: Why Agent Experience Matters".

== Designing for AI agent experience ==
=== Internal systems ===
Design choices that can affect an AI agents experience include the quality of tools, skills, MCP servers and instructions files made available to it. Creating tools by re-using REST APIs originally made for human developers for example, will not normally provide a good agent experience if it is done one endpoint per tool, especially once a large number of such endpoints are made available.

=== Public web interfaces ===
As of 2026, AI agents already facilitate hundreds of billions of dollars worth of consumer spending, with the global spend predicted to be over three $trillion in 2030. This shift raises the desirability for companies to design interfaces on their public web presence with agent experience as well as customer experience (CX) in mind. According to consultants from Alvarez and Marsal, unlike human customers, the purchasing decisions of AI agents are not influenced by emotional considerations like brand loyalty or the psychological appeal of images on the product web sites, but are more influenced by factors such as discoverability and measurable comparisons such as differences in customer review scores.

=== Model welfare ===
There's no consensus in the field of AI as to whether LLMs might currently or at some future point possess sentience. Yet many have argued that the possibility that AIs may deserve moral consideration ought to be taken seriously including the frontier AI Lab Anthropic and leading philosopher of mind, David Chalmers. Regardless of weather LLMs experience any form of consciousness, consideration for model welfare has been found to align with good engineering outcomes. For example giving smaller models tasks which are too difficult for them is inefficient, as is making the most capable models perform repetitive work that might easily be handled by smaller LLMs, or by deterministic tools or algorithms. Similarly, when it comes to tasks near the limit of a models capability, prompting them with encouraging wording can significantly improve performance.

== See also ==
- Ethics of artificial intelligence
- Language model benchmark
