= Boris Cherny =

Ukrainian programmer

- Born: Odesa, Ukraine
- Education: UC San Diego
- Employer: Anthropic
- Known for: Creating Claude Code and Claude Cowork
- Website: https://borischerny.com/

Boris Cherny is a Ukrainian-born American software engineer best known as the creator and head of Claude Code.

== Personal life ==
Cherny was born in Ukraine and his family moved to America in 1995. Cherny studied economics at UC San Diego, but left college to pursue a start up. He then took on a job at Meta, where he worked from 2017 to 2024 on the Instagram team. By his final years at Meta, Cherny held responsibility for code quality across the entire company. In 2024, Cherny was hired to work at Anthropic.

Before working for Anthropic, Cherny was living in rural Japan.
