= NLWeb =

Python project for creating natural language interfaces

Natural Language Web or NLWeb was introduced by Microsoft in 2025. It is an open Python project designed to simplify the creation of natural language interfaces for websites. It enables users to query website contents using natural language, similar to interacting with an AI assistant. Every instance functions as a Model Context Protocol (MCP) server allowing websites to make their content discoverable and accessible to AI agents and other participants.

NLWeb leverages existing web standards like Schema.org and RSS to build conversational capabilities of processing user queries through language models, performing semantic searches against website content and generating natural responses. It is platform-agnostic, running on all major systems and connecting to any vector database. Content to be indexed by NLWeb works best when it is organized in an AI friendly way. This means short, interlinked and semantically annotated articles work best.

Initial adopters of NLWeb include TripAdvisor, Shopify, Eventbrite, and Hearst.
