= Zed (text editor) =

Open source text and code editing program

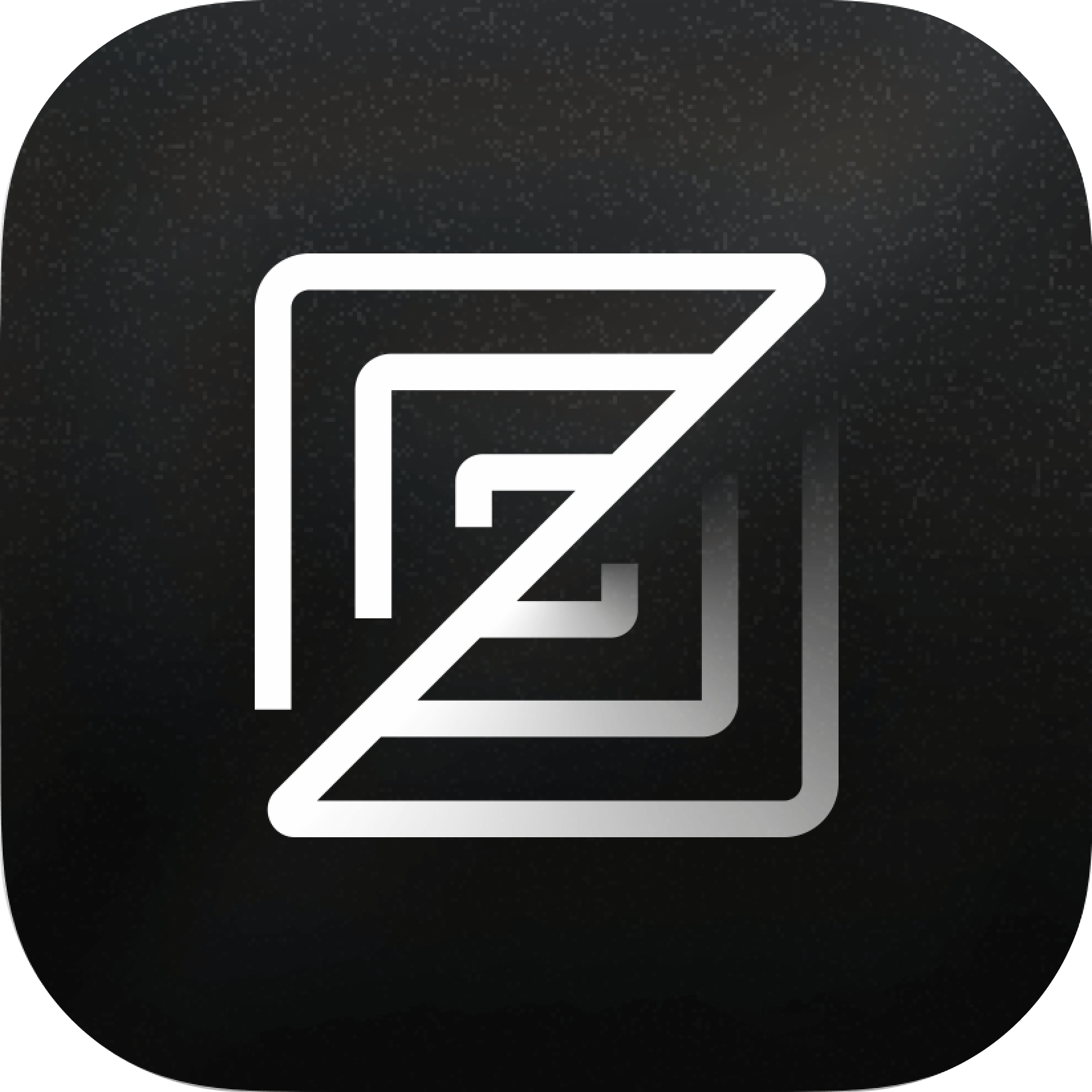
- Developers: Zed Industries, Inc.
- Release
- Stable release: 1.29.3 / 20 November 2026; 2 days ago
- Written in: Rust
- Operating system: Linux, macOS and Windows
- Predecessor: Atom
- Available in: English
- Type: Source-code editor
- License: Primarily under GPL 3.0 or later, with Apache 2.0 components where marked
- Website: zed.dev
- Repository: github.com/zed-industries/zed

Zed is an open-source code editor developed by Zed Industries, Inc. for Linux, macOS, and Windows written using the Rust programming language. It was started by Nathan Sobo, one of the creators of Atom, and is developed by Zed Industries. The editor itself is free to use, but users must pay to use some of the AI features.

Zed offers real-time collaborative editing, integration with optional artificial intelligence tools, which can be turned off, optional Vim and Helix key bindings, and Git support. Zed also supports extensions.

== History ==
After Atom was discontinued in 2022, three key contributors created Zed, announcing it in 2023. In 2024 the project was open-sourced.

In 2025, the project announced Zed Industries had received $32 million in funding from Sequoia Capital.

In April 2026, Zed released version 1.0.

== Parent company ==
Zed is developed by Zed Industries, Inc., a for profit company. They have also created Delta, a multiplayer environment for coding agents.

=== Profit model ===
While the Zed editor is completely free to use, you can pay a subscription and usage-based billing for its Pro and Business plans, which offer AI edit predictions and some free AI credits.

== Supported Platforms ==
Zed is available for Linux, macOS and Windows, with a work-in-progress FreeBSD version and a planned web version coming soon, according to the Zed team.

== Criticisms ==
While Zed has been widely praised for its fast performance, many people have been disappointed in the amount of AI features, calling it "unnecessary bloat". This led to a response from Zed co-founder Conrad Irwin. There have also been criticisms of Zed taking money from Sequoia Capital, which has a partner, Shaun Maguire, who has attracted public criticism for his political statements and social media activity, with users arguing that this blatantly violates Zed's Code of Conduct.

== Notable forks ==
In March 2026, a fork of Zed was released, titled Gram. It was developed by Kristoffer Grönlund, who stated that he created the fork because he did not like Zed's AI coding features, and did not want to accept Zed's terms of use. On the day Gram was released, Zed updated its terms of use. Zed has also given the option to disable AI features.

== See also ==
- List of text editors
- Comparison of integrated development environments
- Comparison of text editors § Programming features
