= Qodo =

AI tool for generating and reviewing code

- Formerly: Codium
- Type: Private
- Industry: AI
- Founded: 2022
- Founder: Itamar Friedman, Dedy Kredo
- Headquarters: Tel Aviv, Israel
- Number of employees: 100 (2025)
- Website: qodo.ai

Qodo is an AI code review platform that uses AI to help create and improve software quality throughout its development lifecycle. It adds an automated, context-aware review layer in a software developer’s code editor/IDE (integrated development environment), pull requests (also known as “merge requests”), CI/CD, and Git workflows (GitHub, GitLab).

== History ==
Qodo, initially called CodiumAI, was founded in 2022 by Itamar Friedman, formerly Alibaba Group’s Director in their Israeli AI Lab, and Dedy Kredo who previously led product and data science teams at Exploriem and VMware. By 2025, the company grew to employ 100 people across Israel, the U.S., and Europe. In March 2026, Qodo raised $70 million in a Series B round led by Qumra Capital, bringing its total funding to $120 million.

Qodo was named among the AI Disruptors 60 list on TechCrunch, and named a visionary in the 2025 Gartner Magic Quadrant for AI coding assistants. In March 2026 Qodo was ranked first for precision of 63.4% on Martian's Code Review Bench (continually updated independent project).

== Products ==
Qodo’s products provide AI-assisted automated code review and code quality tooling for software engineering teams maintaining large or fast-changing codebases. Its agents use multi-repository context to evaluate the impact of each change, enforce organisation-specific standards and generate review comments, tests and maintenance updates such as documentation or changelogs. Qodo's features combine AI code review, code quality, and SDLC governance in one platform.

Qodo previously marketed separate products called Qodo Merge, Qodo Gen, Qodo Command, and Qodo Aware, but these names are no longer in use. Their functionality has been unified into the core Qodo AI Code Review Platform.

In 2026, launched Qodo 2.0 - a multi-agent code review architecture and an expanded context engine; and Agentic Toolbox - a set of ready-made skills that agents can call when planning, writing and reviewing code. The release included a new AI code review benchmark, in which Qodo showed the highest recall and overall F1 score among tested tools.

== Financing ==
Qodo's early funding included investments from TLV Partners, Vine Ventures, and angel investors OpenAI, and VMware. In 2023, the company raised $11 million in seed funding. In 2024, Qodo completed a $40 million Series A funding round led by Susa Ventures and Square Peg and series B funding bringing its total valuation to $120 million.

== See also ==
- List of AI-assisted software development tools
