= Sourcegraph =

Code intelligence platform

- Type: Private
- Industry: Information technology
- Founded: 2013
- Founder: Quinn Slack and Beyang Liu
- Products: Code Search, Amp, Cody (Legacy)
- Website: about.sourcegraph.com

Sourcegraph Inc. is a company developing code search and code intelligence tools that semantically index and analyze large codebases so that they can be searched across commercial, open-source, local, and cloud-based repositories.

The company has two core products: Code Search and Amp. A previous core product, Cody, retains limited legacy support for existing customers. Code Search was initially released in 2013 under the name Sourcegraph, but was rebranded to Code Search when the company unveiled Cody in 2023. As of 2021, the platform has around 800,000 developers and has indexed around 54 billion lines of code. In July 2025, new accounts for Cody were discontinued, and a new AI coding project, Amp, was released. In December 2025, Amp was spun-off to become a separate company.

== History ==
Sourcegraph Inc. was founded by Stanford graduates Quinn Slack and Beyang Liu to drive the development of a code search and code intelligence tool, formerly called Sourcegraph. It was first released in 2013 but was rebranded to Code Search in 2023. It was partly inspired by Liu's experience using Google Code Search while he was a Google intern, It was designed to "tackle the big code problem" by enabling developers to manage large codebases that span multiple repositories, programming languages, file formats, and projects.

Code Search was initially self-hosted by each customer on their own infrastructure. Early customers included Uber, Dropbox, and Lyft. In 2016, Code Search was criticized for being provided with a Fair Source License with the developers explaining that "all of Sourcegraph's source code is publicly available and hackable" and was intended to "help open sourcers strike a balance between getting paid and preserving their values". In 2018, Code Search was licensed under the Apache License 2.0, and Sourcegraph OSS has since been released under the Apache License 2.0. The commercial version, Code Search Enterprise, has been released under its own license. In 2023, Code Search was criticized for dropping the Apache license for most of its code, leaving it public but only available under its Enterprise license. In 2024, the main repository was made completely private.

In 2019, Code Search was integrated into the GitLab codebase, giving GitLab users access to a browser-based developer platform. In 2021, a browser-based portal became available, allowing users to browse open-source projects and personal private code for free. In 2022, Sourcegraph Cloud, a commercial single-tenant cloud solution for organizations with more than 100 developers, was launched.

Sourcegraph has raised a total of $223 million in financing to date. Its most recent $125 million Series D investment in 2021 valued the company at $2.625 billion, a 300% growth from its previous valuation in 2020.

Date	Funding Type	Money Raised (USD)	No. of Investors	Lead Investor
July 2021	Series D round	125,000,000	4	Andreessen Horowitz
December 2020	Series C round	50,000,000	1	Sequoia Capital
July 2020	Series B round	5,000,000	1	Felicis Ventures
March 2020	Series B round	23,000,000	3	Craft Ventures
October 2017	Series A round	20,000,000	3	Goldcrest Capital, Redpoint

In 2023 Sourcegraph Inc. unveiled their new product Cody, and rebranded Sourcegraph to Code Search. In 2025, Sourcegraph announced the discontinuation of Cody Free, Pro, and Enterprise Starter plans, effective July 23, 2025, and launched Amp, a new AI coding agent.

== Products ==
The company has three major products: Code Search, Amp, and Cody.

=== Sourcegraph Code Search ===
Code Search tool is used to search and summarize code. It supports over 30 programming languages and integrates with GitHub and GitLab for code hosting, Codecov for code coverage, and Jira Software for project management. Sourcegraph's Code Search uses a variant of Google's PageRank algorithm to rank results by relevance. While it was originally launched under the Apache License, on June 13, 2023, it was relicensed to the non-open-source "Sourcegraph Enterprise" license. Then, on August 22, 2024, the source code was moved to a private repository, and thus no longer source-available.

=== Sourcegraph Amp ===
Launched in 2025, Amp can generate code, generate documentation, write tests, and perform refactoring operations on projects. The tool operates on a credit-based pricing model and is available through web interfaces, command-line tools, and IDE extensions.

In December 2025, Sourcegraph announced that Amp would be spun-off to become a separate company.

=== Sourcegraph Cody ===
Cody is an AI coding application for writing and maintaining code. Cody was released in December 2023 and was available for Microsoft Visual Studio Code and most JetBrains IDEs. As of July 2025, Cody Free, Pro, and Enterprise Starter plans have been discontinued, with only Cody Enterprise remaining available for existing enterprise customers.

== See also ==
- SaaS
- Code reviewing software
- Intelligent code completion
- Generative AI
- Model Context Protocol
