= Language Server Protocol =

Protocol between IDEs and programming language-specific servers

The Language Server Protocol (LSP) is an open, JSON-RPC-based protocol for use between source-code editors or integrated development environments (IDEs) and servers that provide "language intelligence tools": Programming language-specific features like code completion, syntax highlighting and marking of warnings and errors, as well as refactoring routines. The goal of the protocol is to allow programming language support to be implemented and distributed independently of any given editor or IDE. In the early 2020s, LSP quickly became a "norm" for language intelligence tools providers.

In LSP, the editor or IDE acts as a client and communicates with a language server that analyzes code and provides language specific functionality. The client notifies the server about actions, including opening/modifying files. It can additionally request operations such as code completion, navigation, formatting, and refactoring. The server then returns the requested information or edits. This separation lets a single language server provide language support to multiple editors rather than requiring each editor to implement its own language specific tooling. LSP was originally developed for Microsoft Visual Studio Code, and in 2016 Microsoft, Red Hat, and Codenvy announced a collaboration to standardize the specification. It is not limited to programming languages and can be used with other text based languages including domain-specific languages.

== History ==
LSP was originally developed for Microsoft Visual Studio Code and is now an open standard. On June 27, 2016, Microsoft announced a collaboration with Red Hat and Codenvy to standardize the protocol's specification. Its specification is hosted and developed on GitHub.

== Background ==
Modern IDEs provide programmers with sophisticated features like code completion, refactoring, navigating to a symbol's definition, syntax highlighting, and error and warning markers.

For example, in a text-based programming language, a programmer might want to rename a method read. The programmer could either manually edit the respective source code files and change the appropriate occurrences of the old method name into the new name, or instead use an IDE's refactoring capabilities to make all the necessary changes automatically. To be able to support this style of refactoring, an IDE needs a sophisticated understanding of the programming language that the program's source is written in. A programming tool without such an understanding—for example, one that performs a naive search-and-replace instead—could introduce errors. When renaming a read method, for example, the tool should not replace the partial match in a variable that might be called readyState, nor should it replace the portion of a code comment containing the word "already". Neither should renaming a local variable read, for example, end up altering identically-named variables in other scopes.

Conventional compilers or interpreters for a specific programming language are typically unable to provide these language services, because they are written with the goal of either transforming the source code into object code or immediately executing the code. Additionally, language services must be able to handle source code that is not well-formed, e.g. because the programmer is in the middle of editing and has not yet finished typing a statement, procedure, or other construct. Additionally, small changes to a source code file which are done during typing usually change the semantics of the program. In order to provide instant feedback to the user, the editing tool must be able to very quickly evaluate the syntactical and semantical consequences of a specific modification. Compilers and interpreters therefore provide a poor candidate for producing the information needed for an editing tool to consume.

Prior to the design and implementation of the Language Server Protocol for the development of Visual Studio Code, most language services were generally tied to a given IDE or other editor. In the absence of the Language Server Protocol, language services are typically implemented by using a tool-specific extension API. Providing the same language service to another editing tool requires effort to adapt the existing code so that the service may target the second editor's extension interfaces.

The Language Server Protocol allows for decoupling language services from the editor so that the services may be contained within a general-purpose language server. Any editor can inherit sophisticated support for many different languages by making use of existing language servers. Similarly, a programmer involved with the development of a new programming language can make services for that language available to existing editing tools. Making use of language servers via the Language Server Protocol thus also reduces the burden on vendors of editing tools, because vendors do not need to develop language services of their own for the languages the vendor intends to support, as long as the language servers have already been implemented. The Language Server Protocol also enables the distribution and development of servers contributed by an interested third party, such as end users, without additional involvement by either the vendor of the compiler for the programming language in use or the vendor of the editor to which the language support is being added.

LSP is not restricted to programming languages. It can be used for any kind of text-based language, like specifications or domain-specific languages (DSL).

== Technical overview ==
When a user edits one or more source code files using a language server protocol-enabled tool, the tool acts as a client that consumes the language services provided by a language server. The tool may be a text editor or IDE and the language services could be refactoring, code completion, etc.

The client informs the server about what the user is doing, e.g., opening a file or inserting a character at a specific text position. The client can also request the server to perform a language service, e.g. to format a specified range in the text document. The server answers a client's request with an appropriate response. For example, the formatting request is answered either by a response that transfers the formatted text to the client or by an error response containing details about the error.

The Language Server Protocol defines the messages to be exchanged between client and language server. They are JSON-RPC preceded by headers similar to HTTP. Messages may originate from the server or client.

The protocol does not make any provisions about how requests, responses and notifications are transferred between client and server. For example, client and server could be components within the same process exchanging JSON strings via method calls. They could also be different processes on the same or on different machines communicating via network sockets.

== Registry ==
There are lists of LSP-compatible implementations, maintained by the community-driven Langserver.org or Microsoft.
