= Agent2Agent =

Open protocol for communication between AI agents

Agent2Agent (A2A)
- Developed by: Google, Linux Foundation
- Introduced: April 2025
- Industry: Artificial intelligence
- Connector type: MCP
- Website: https://a2a-protocol.org

Agent2Agent (A2A) is an open protocol that defines how artificial intelligence agents communicate with each other across different systems. It is intended to allow agents built by different vendors or frameworks to discover one another, exchange messages, and coordinate tasks.

== History ==
The Agent2Agent protocol was announced by Google in April 2025 as an open standard for agent interoperability. In June 2025, Google transferred the protocol, its specification, and related software development kits to the Linux Foundation. The Linux Foundation established the Agent2Agent project to provide vendor-neutral governance.

== Design ==
The A2A protocol supports communication between autonomous software agents operating across different platforms and organizations. It enables agents to discover one another and exchange structured messages without requiring shared internal state or proprietary integrations.

A2A uses metadata documents, known as Agent Cards, to describe an agent's capabilities and how it can be accessed. These documents are exchanged using widely adopted web technologies such as HTTP and JSON-based messaging formats.

A2A includes support for authentication and authorization to control which agents may participate in workflows. The protocol supports established security technologies including Transport Layer Security (TLS), JSON Web Tokens (JWTs), and OpenID Connect.

A2A is often discussed alongside the Model Context Protocol (MCP). MCP focuses on connecting agents to tools and data sources, while A2A focuses on communication between agents themselves.

== Adoption ==
At the time the Linux Foundation adopted the protocol, more than 100 technology companies had announced support for the Agent2Agent project. Microsoft stated that it planned to support the protocol in its AI platforms.AWS, Cisco, Salesforce, and SAP also joined the project in 2025.

== Reception ==
Technology press coverage has described A2A as an attempt to reduce fragmentation in AI agent ecosystems by providing a shared communication layer. TechRepublic characterized the protocol as part of a broader industry effort to reduce vendor lock-in for enterprise AI systems.

== See also ==
- Model Context Protocol
