= Tabnine =

Coding assistant

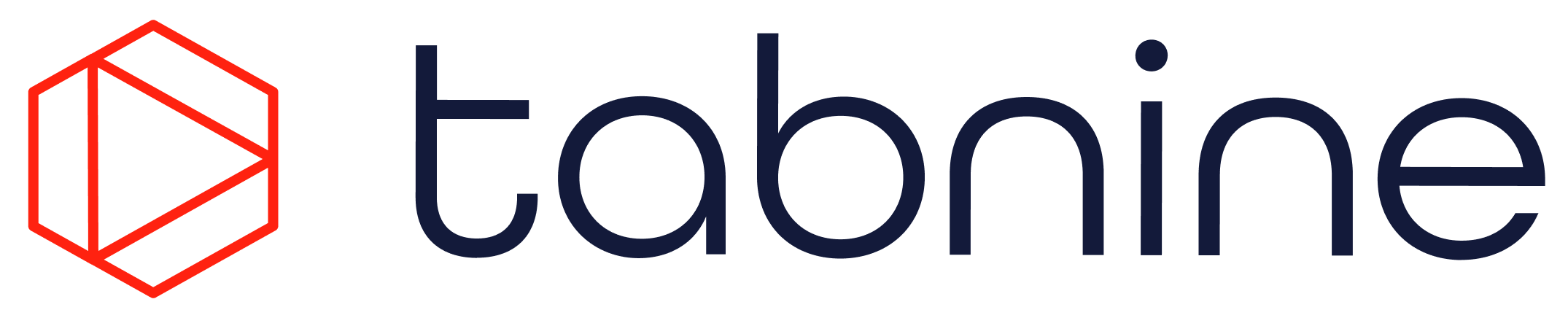
- Formerly: Codota
- Industry: AI; programming
- Founder: Dror Weiss and Eran Yahav
- Headquarters: Tel Aviv, Israel
- Products: AI coding assistant
- Website: www.tabnine.com

Tabnine is a code completion tool which uses generative artificial intelligence to assist users by autocompleting code. It was created in 2018 by Jacob Jackson, a student at the University of Waterloo. It is now developed by Tabnine, a software company founded under the name Codota by Dror Weiss and Eran Yahav in Tel Aviv, Israel, in 2013, and renamed to Tabnine in 2021. Initially established under the name Codota, the company underwent a rebranding in May 2021 following the release of the company’s first large language model based AI coding assistant, adopting the name Tabnine.

== History ==
Tabnine was established as Codota in 2013 by Dror Weiss and Eran Yahav in Tel Aviv, Israel. Tabnine, initially founded under the name Codota, was created to develop tools based on over a decade of academic research at the Technion.

Codota, the predecessor of Tabnine, secured $2 million in seed investment in June 2017. Following this, in June 2018, the company introduced the first AI-based code completion for Java IDE.

In 2019, Codota acquired a product called Tabnine, which used the newly available large-language model technology to provide generative AI for software code across a broader range of programming languages across five IDEs. Codota replaced its earlier approach to code generation with this new approach to generative AI.

The company secured a Series A round of funding in April 2020, raising $12 million.

On May 26, 2021, Codota changed its name to Tabnine and underwent a corresponding rebranding.

By April 2022, Tabnine reached over one million users. In June of the same year, Tabnine launched models that could predict full lines and snippets of code. The same year it raised $15.5 mln in a funding round led co-led by Qualcomm Ventures.

In June 2023, Tabnine introduced an AI-powered chat agent, enabling developers to use natural language to generate code, to explain code, to generate tests and documentation, and to propose fixes to code.

In November 2023, Tabnine closed a Series B round of funding, raising $25 million to scale the company’s operations.

== Operations ==
Tabnine's headquarters is located in Tel Aviv, Israel, with an additional corporate entity in the United States.

As of November 2023, Tabnine generative AI for software development is used by a million developers. It has 10 million installations across VS Code and JetBrains.

Since its founding, Dror Weiss has served as CEO, with Eran Yahav as CTO.

== See also ==
- List of AI-assisted software development tools
- List of integrated development environments
- No-code development platform
