= Code completion =

Autocompletion feature in IDEs

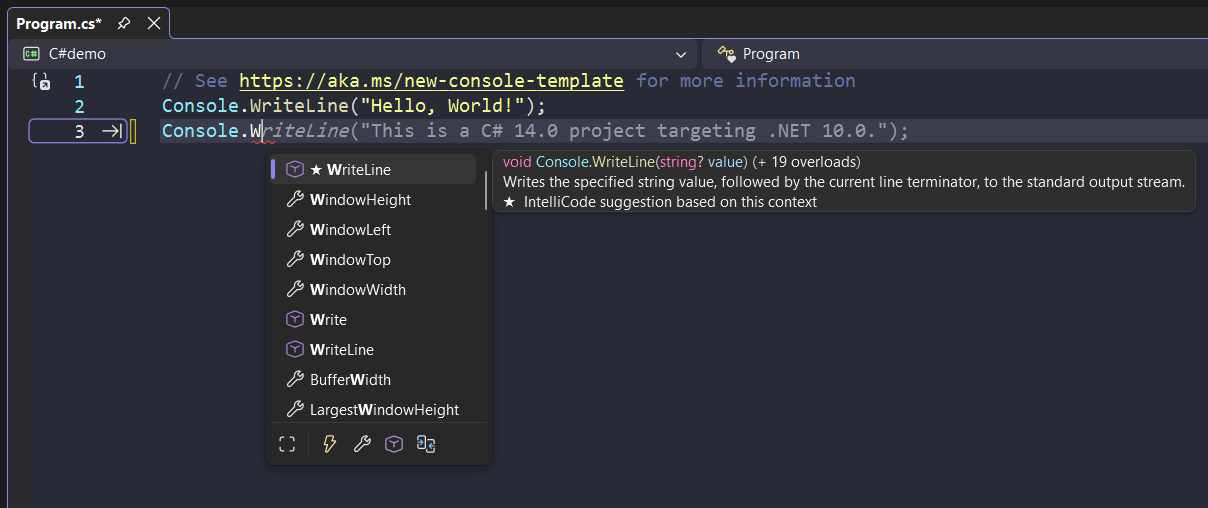
Demonstration of code completion in Microsoft Visual Studio 2025, with AI-assisted suggestions available.

Code completion is an autocompletion feature in many integrated development environments (IDEs) that speeds up the process of coding applications by fixing common mistakes and suggesting lines of code. This usually happens through popups while typing, querying parameters of functions, and query hints related to syntax errors. Code completion and related tools serve as documentation and disambiguation for variable names, functions, and methods, using static analysis.

The feature appears in many programming environments. Implementations include IntelliSense in Visual Studio and Visual Studio Code. The term was originally popularized as "picklist" and some implementations still refer to it as such.

== Overview ==
Intelligent code completion, which is similar to other autocompletion systems, is a convenient way to access descriptions of functions—and in particular their parameter lists. The feature speeds up software development by reducing keyboard input and the necessity for name memorization. It also allows for users to refer less frequently to external documentation, as interactive documentation on many symbols (i.e. variables and functions) in the active scope appears dynamically in the form of tooltips.

Intelligent code completion uses an automatically generated in-memory database of classes, variable names, and other constructs that given computer code defines or references. The "classic" implementation of IntelliSense works by detecting marker characters such as periods (or other separator characters, depending on the language). When the user types one of these characters immediately after the name of an entity having one or more accessible members (such as contained variables or functions), IntelliSense suggests matches in a pop-up dialog. The user can either accept the suggestion by typing a statement-completion character (Tab ↹ or ↵ Enter) or a language-specific marker (such as the semicolon for C++), or continue typing the name. Over time, IntelliSense determines which variable or function the user most likely needs. IntelliSense also displays a short description of a function in the pop-up window—depending on the amount of documentation in the function's source code.

The feature also lets users select from a number of overloaded functions in languages that support object-oriented programming. Some code editing software provide intelligent code completion through a Language Server Protocol (LSP) server.

== History ==
Research on intelligent code completion began in 1957, with spelling checkers for bitmap images of cursive writing and special applications to find records in databases despite incorrect entries. In 1961, Les Earnest, who headed the research on this budding technology, saw it necessary to include the first spell checker that accessed a list of 10,000 acceptable words. Ralph Gorin, a graduate student under Earnest at the time, created the first true spell-check program written as an application (rather than research) for general English text. SPELL, for the DEC PDP-10 at Stanford University's Artificial Intelligence Laboratory (SAIL), was published in February 1971. Gorin wrote the program in assembly for faster action; he made it by searching a word list for plausible correct spellings that differ by a single letter or adjacent-letter transpositions, and presenting them to the user. Gorin made SPELL publicly accessible, as was done with most SAIL programs, and it soon spread around the world via the then-new ARPANET, about a decade before personal computers came into general use. SPELL and its algorithms and data structures inspired the Unix program Ispell.

== Support in editors and IDEs ==
=== Visual Studio ===
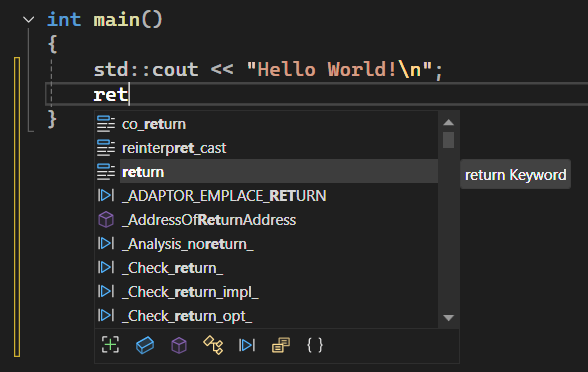
Code completion in Visual Studio 2022.

IntelliSense is Microsoft's implementation of code completion, best known in Visual Studio. It was first introduced as a feature of a mainstream Microsoft product in 1996 building on many already invented concepts of code completion and syntax checking, with the Visual Basic 5.0 Control Creation Edition, which was essentially a publicly available prototype for Visual Basic 5.0. Initially, Visual Basic IDE was the primary "test bed" for the technology, but IntelliSense was incorporated into Visual FoxPro and Visual C++ in the Visual Studio 97 timeframe (one revision after first seen in Visual Basic). Because it was based on the introspection capabilities of COM, the Visual Basic versions of IntelliSense were always more robust and complete than the 5.0 and 6.0 (97 and 98 in the Visual Studio naming sequence) versions of Visual C++, which did not have the benefit of being entirely based on COM. These shortcomings, such as a lack of template support, criticized by many VC++ developers, have been largely corrected in the .NET product lines.

IntelliSense entered a new phase of development with the unified Visual Studio.NET environment first released in 2001, augmented by the more powerful introspection and code documentation capabilities provided by the .NET framework. IntelliSense is now supported by the Visual Studio editors for C++, C#, J#, Visual Basic, XML, HTML and XSLT among others. As of Visual Studio 2005, IntelliSense is activated by default when the user begins to type, instead of requiring marker characters (though this behavior can be turned off). The IDE has the capability of inferring a greater amount of context based on what the developer is typing, to the point that basic language constructs such as for and while are also included in the choice list. In 2017 Microsoft announced IntelliCode, which uses machine learning to infer exactly which language or library feature is likely to be intended at every keystroke. Initially available as an extension for C# only, it is expected to be built in to future releases of Visual Studio.

Visual Studio 2022 includes artificial-intelligence features, such as GitHub Copilot, which can automatically suggest entire lines of code based on surrounding context.

Other Microsoft products that incorporate IntelliSense include Expression Web, FrontPage 2003, Small Basic, the Visual Basic for Applications IDEs in the Microsoft Office products, Visual Studio Code and many others. SQL Server 2008 Management Studio has autocomplete for the SQL syntax.

=== Eclipse ===
The Eclipse IDE has code completion tools that come packaged with the program. It includes notable support for Java, C++, and JavaScript code authoring. The Code Recommenders Eclipse project used to provide powerful intelligent completion, but due to lack of resources, was dropped in Eclipse 2018–12, and then archived in July 2019.

=== Vim ===
Vim Intellisense is an advanced code completion system for the Vim editor.

== Example ==
Assume a C++ application being edited in Visual Studio has a class Foo with some member functions:

class Foo {
  public:
    void bar();
    void foo_bar(char c, int n);
};

When the developer references this class in source code, e.g.:

Foo foo;
foo.

as soon as the user types the period after foo, IntelliSense automatically lists all the available member functions (i.e. bar() and foo_bar()) and all the available member attributes (private and protected members can be identified by a padlock picture beside their names). The user can then select one by using the arrow keys and hitting a completion character when the correct member function is highlighted. When available, IntelliSense displays a short description of the member function as given in the source code documentation.

IntelliSense goes further by indicating the required parameters in another pop-up window as the user fills in the parameters. As the user types a variable name, the feature also makes suggestions to complete the variable as they are typed. IntelliSense continues to show parameters, highlighting the pertinent one, as the user types.

The user can "force" IntelliSense to show its pop-up list without context by using Ctrl+J or Ctrl+Space. In Visual Studio this displays the entire application domain object model available to the developer.

== See also ==
- Tabnine – Coding assistant
- Microsoft Copilot
- Autocomplete
- Autocorrection
