= AI-assisted software development =

AI software development optimisation

AI-assisted software development is the use of large language models (LLMs) and AI agents to assist software developers in software development. It can be used in a range of tasks, from writing source code to debugging, testing, and documentation. The practice can sometimes improve the velocity of software delivery, but at the cost of taking on substantive quality risks.

== Methods ==
=== Source code generation ===
LLMs trained or fine-tuned on source-code corpora can generate source code from natural-language descriptions, comments, or docstrings. Research on code-generation systems often evaluates generated programs by functional correctness, such as whether the output passes automated test cases. Such tools can be features or extensions of integrated development environments (IDEs).

==== Vibe coding ====
Vibe coding is software development assisted by AI where the software developer describes a project or task in a prompt to an LLM that generates source code automatically. Vibe coding may involve accepting AI-generated code without thorough review of the output, instead relying on results and follow-up prompts to guide changes.

The term was coined in February 2025 by computer scientist Andrej Karpathy, a co-founder of OpenAI and former AI leader at Tesla. Merriam-Webster listed the term in March 2025 as a "slang & trending" expression. It was named the Collins English Dictionary Word of the Year for 2025.

Advocates of vibe coding say it allows amateur programmers to produce software without the extensive training and skills required for software engineering. Critics point out a lack of accountability, maintainability, and an increased risk of introducing security vulnerabilities in the resulting software.

=== Intelligent code completion ===
AI agents using pre-trained and fine-tuned LLMs can propose code completion suggestions based on context. Code completion suggestions are small localized edits based on a partially written code fragment, usually at the level of a single line of source code. According to a 2025 literature review by Husein, Aburajouh & Catal in Computer Standards & Interfaces, "LLMs significantly enhance code completion performance across several programming languages and contexts, and their capability to predict relevant code snippets based on context and partial input boosts developer productivity substantially."

=== Improving software quality ===
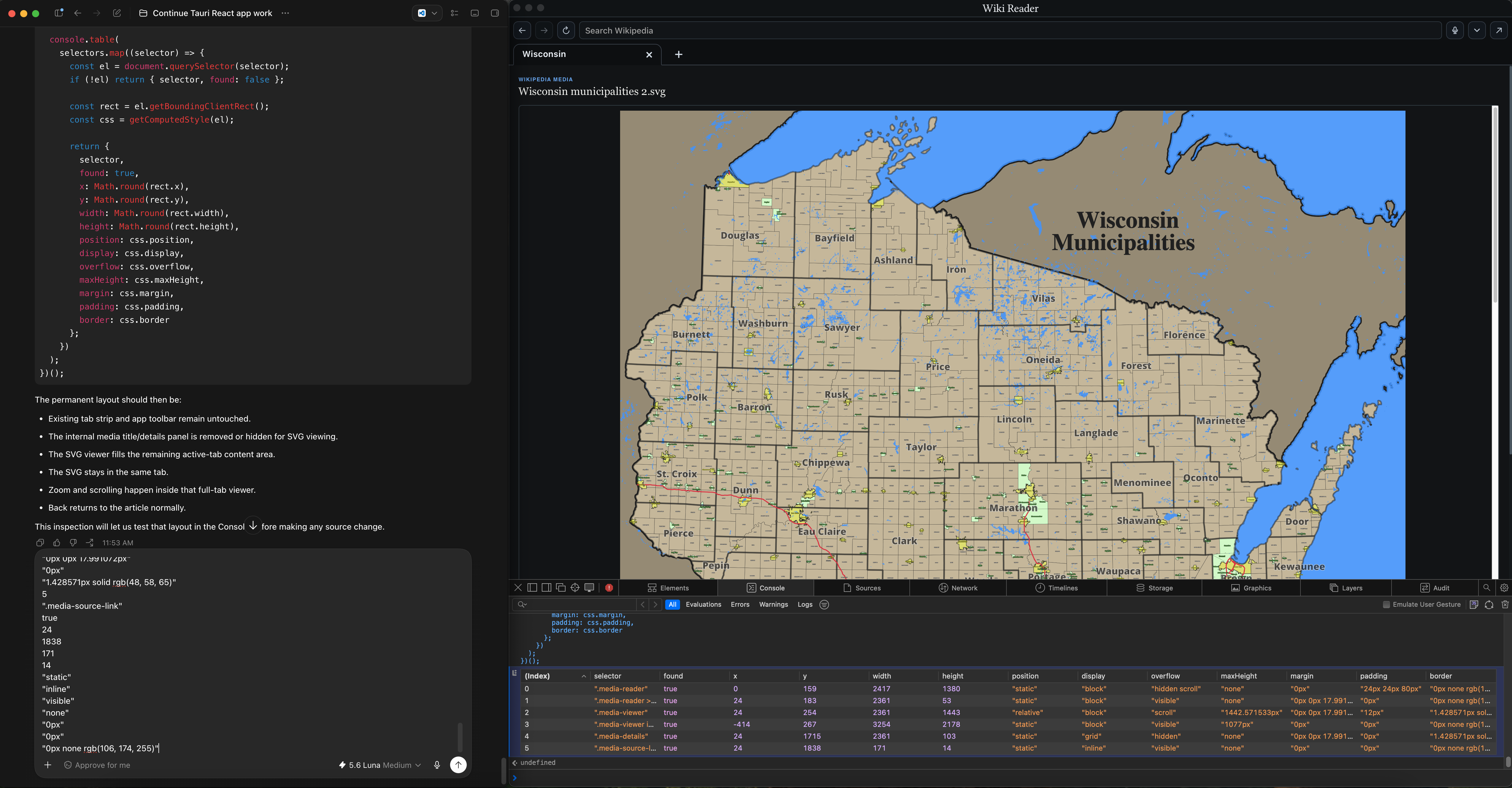
OpenAI Codex working with Tauri and using the DOM Inspector to do diagnostics and optimizations before making edits to the source code

LLM-based tools can be used to identify potential bugs and security vulnerabilities, and suggest fixes. AI can also be used to perform static code analysis and suggest potential performance improvements.

== Limitations ==
Both ownership of and responsibility for AI-generated code is disputed.

According to a report from the German Federal Office for Information Security (September 2024), the use of AI coding assistants without careful oversight from experienced developers can introduce major security vulnerabilities or generate incorrect solutions (about 50% of the time), and any potential gain in productivity should be weighed against the cost of additional quality control and security measures. The report also states that a programmer relying too much on AI coding assistants runs the risk of losing the skill to review and evaluate source code. The report further states that AI coding assistants create novel vectors for cyberattack as well as a potential for exfiltration of confidential data for model training by the providers of AI coding assistants. According to Deloitte, outputs from AI-assisted software development must be validated through a combination of automated testing, static analysis tools, and human review, creating a governance layer to improve quality and accountability.

== Companies using AI for coding ==
Multiple big tech companies have reported using AI for coding.

In the fall of 2024, about a quarter of Google's code was generated by AI. By the next fall, it was about half. In April 2026, it was reported that roughly three quarters of new code created within Google was AI generated and then reviewed by human engineers.

In April 2025, between 20% and 30% of the code for some of Microsoft's projects was written by AI.

In April 2026, Snap said at least 65% of its new code was AI generated.

== See also ==
- Integrated development environment
- Comparison of integrated development environments
- List of AI-assisted software development tools
- List of integrated development environments
- Machine learning
- No-code development platform
