= Claude (AI) =

Large language model and AI chatbot by Anthropic

- Developer: Anthropic
- Release: March 14, 2023 (3 years ago)
- Stable release: Claude Fable 5.2; November 9, 2026 (13 days ago); Claude Opus 5.5; September 22, 2026 (2 months ago); Claude Sonnet 5.5; September 28, 2026 (55 days ago); Claude Haiku 5.5; October 7, 2026 (46 days ago)
- Platform: Cloud computing
- Type: Large language model; Chatbot; Generative pre-trained transformer; Foundation model
- License: Proprietary
- Website: claude.ai

Claude is a series of large language models (LLMs) developed by American software company Anthropic. Claude was released as an AI-based chatbot in March 2023. It is also used in AI-assisted software development. Anthropic sells Claude-based agentic tools including Claude Code, a terminal coding agent, and Claude Duet, which runs in a virtual machine, allowing it to run without input from a user.

Claude is trained using a constitution, a technique developed by Anthropic to improve ethical and legal compliance. Since Claude 3, each generation has typically been released in three sizes, named Haiku (the least capable), Sonnet, and Opus (the most capable). In 2026, a more capable model named Claude Mythos was released to a handful of companies and organizations; this was followed by the release of Claude Fable, a version of Mythos with stricter safeguards, to the general public.

In February 2026, the United States Department of Defense designated Anthropic a "supply chain risk" and federal agencies were ordered to phase out Claude after the company refused to remove contractual prohibitions on using Claude for mass domestic surveillance and fully autonomous weapons. A federal judge blocked the designation in March 2026 and permanently set it aside in August 2026 as unconstitutional retaliation.

In 2026, Anthropic researchers and external mathematicians increasingly used Claude for automated theorem proving and formal verification in proof assistants such as Lean. This includes a formal proof of the Riemann hypothesis proposed by Anthropic mathematician Levent Alpöge in collaboration with Claude.

== Products ==
=== Claude ===
Claude is a generative AI chatbot. It sometimes uses artifacts, a feature introduced in June 2024 to generate and interact with code snippets and documents. In 2025, Anthropic added a web search feature to Claude.

Claude Pro and Claude Max are subscription services for additional access to Claude models. Max provides higher usage limits at an additional cost. Grouped subscriptions include Claude Team and Claude Enterprise. According to card-spend data from Ramp, the share of businesses on its platform paying for Anthropic products rose 4.9 percentage points in February 2026, to 24.4%, the largest monthly gain Ramp had recorded for the company.

Claude is reportedly named after Claude Shannon, a 20th-century mathematician who laid the foundation for information theory.

==== Chat sharing ====
A Claude feature allows users to share chats with anyone who has the link. In September 2025, Forbes reported that hundreds of shared Claude chats had appeared in Google Search results, following similar incidents involving OpenAI's ChatGPT and xAI's Grok.

In July 2026, shared chats and Artifacts were again found to be indexed by Google. The BBC counted more than 200, some containing health records and corporate documents. The affected chats were those whose links had been posted on the public internet. Technical analysis suggested that a robots.txt rule blocking crawlers from shared-chat pages also prevented them from reading the noindex directive meant to keep the pages out of search results. Anthropic said the listings had been removed.

=== Application programming interface ===
Claude is also provided through an application programming interface (API). In October 2024, the "computer use" feature was introduced by which an application can call the Claude API to attempt to give navigational control of the application via Claude's interpretation of screen content and simulation of keyboard and mouse input.

=== Claude Code ===
Claude Code, released in February 2025, is an agentic command line tool to delegate coding tasks from the terminal using natural language prompts. It was made generally available in May 2025 alongside Claude 4. Based on enterprise adoption, Anthropic reported a 5.5x increase in Claude Code revenue by July.

The creator and current head of Claude Code is Boris Cherny.

In August 2025, Anthropic reported that cybercriminals it designated "GTG-2002" had used Claude Code in a data-extortion campaign against at least 17 organizations. In November 2025, Anthropic said that in September a China-based cybercrime group had used Claude Code to automate 80–90% of its espionage cyberattacks against 30 organizations.

On October 20, 2025, Anthropic launched a web version of Claude Code and a sandboxing feature. Coinciding with performance improvements tied to Claude Opus 4.5, Claude Code went viral during the 2025–2026 winter holidays when people had time to experiment with it, including many non-programmers who used it for vibe coding.

Claude Code is used by Microsoft and Google, and was used by OpenAI employees until August 2025, when Anthropic revoked OpenAI's API access, calling it "a direct violation of our terms of service". In February 2026, Anthropic introduced Claude Code Security, which reviews codebases to identify vulnerabilities. In March 2026, the source code for the Claude Code command-line interface application was leaked, revealing multiple upcoming features and models.

In May 2026, Anthropic introduced "Dreaming", a research-preview feature of its Managed Agents API that consolidates an agent's persistent memory between sessions by merging duplicates and removing stale entries; a memory consolidation feature called autoDream had been identified in the March source code leak.

=== Claude in Chrome ===
In August 2025, Anthropic released Claude for Chrome, a Google Chrome extension that lets Claude browse websites, click and fill forms on the user's behalf. It launched as a pilot for 1,000 Max subscribers. Anthropic said prompt-injection attacks succeeded 11.2% of the time after mitigations. It became generally available in August 2026.

=== Claude Cowork ===
Claude Cowork is a tool similar to Claude Code but with a graphical user interface, aimed at non-technical users. It was released in January 2026 as a "research preview". Cowork is available as a desktop application for Mac and Windows and through a web interface. It provides Claude with access to a sandboxed shell and to user-selected folders on the local file system, allowing the model to read, write and edit files, execute code, and chain multi-step tasks within a single conversation, such as organizing files on a user's computer or generating documents from material in a local folder. A Wall Street Journal reporter who tested the tool noted user concerns about granting an AI agent broad access to a personal computer. An early user reported that, after asking Cowork to organize the files on the desktop of his wife's computer, it deleted all the family photos requiring the restoration of the images from an iCloud backup.

In February 2026, Anthropic announced a wider enterprise release of Cowork, adding connectors for services such as Google Drive, Gmail, Docusign and FactSet, and customizable plugins for domains including financial analysis, engineering and human resources. The company described the update as a transition into an "enterprise-grade product". In March 2026, Anthropic added Dispatch, which lets users send Cowork tasks from a phone to their computer, and allows Claude to operate programs on the user's computer, such as web browsers or spreadsheet applications, to carry out tasks. According to developers, Cowork was mostly built by Claude Code.

In August 2026, Cowork was made available in a sidebar of the Chrome browser.

In September 2026, the distinct standalone Cowork tab was eliminated and folded directly into regular conversations, eliminating the need to pick a mode before starting.

=== Claude Design ===
Claude Design is a tool released by Anthropic as a preview for paying customers on April 17, 2026. It generates designs, prototypes, slides and marketing materials from natural-language prompts, uses Claude Opus, and can export to multiple formats.

=== Claude Science ===
Announced on June 30, 2026, the Claude Science service was released in public beta to paid subscribers, with an emphasis on biology research and drug development.

=== Claude Duet ===
Claude Duet was unveiled on October 21, 2026. It operates on a virtual machine, allowing it to run without input from a user. The main purpose of Duet is to provide an AI agent capable of notifying users about important information that may need their attention, instead of requiring users to message an agent. Claude Duet is in research preview as of November 2026; access is limited to users in the United States who have a Pro, Max, or Ultra plan, and have been accepted from a waitlist.

== Training ==
Claude models are generative pre-trained transformers that have been trained to predict the next word in large amounts of text. Then, they have been fine-tuned using reinforcement learning from human feedback (RLHF) and constitutional AI in an attempt to enforce ethical guidelines. ClaudeBot searches the web for content. It was criticized by iFixit in 2024 for accessing their site over a million times a day to scrape content without permission, and also for the resulting excessive load on their system.

=== Constitutional AI ===
Anthropic introduced an approach to AI alignment called "Constitutional AI". The constitution is a document used to train Claude to be harmless and helpful without relying on extensive or expensive human feedback. Time described this constitution as "somewhere between a moral philosophy thesis and a company culture blog post".

The original version was a list of principles. The first constitution for Claude was published in 2022. The 2023 update listed 75 guidelines for Claude to follow. The first constitutions included concepts taken from the 1948 UN Universal Declaration of Human Rights. The 2026 version includes more thorough explanations for how Claude is intended to behave and why, and has 23,000 words, an increase from 2,700 in 2023.

== Models ==
There are four tiers of Claude models: Haiku, Sonnet, Opus, and Mythos (from smallest and least expensive to largest and most expensive). Mythos is only available to some organizations, whereas Fable, a Mythos-tier series, is available to the public but with safeguards limiting its usability in areas deemed high-risk like cybersecurity and biology.

Early Claude models
Version	Release date	API status
Claude	14 March 2023	Discontinued
2	11 July 2023	Discontinued
Instant 1.2	9 August 2023	Discontinued
2.1	21 November 2023	Discontinued

Haiku
Version	Release date	Knowledge cutoff date	API status
3	13 March 2024	August 2023	Discontinued
3.5	22 October 2024	July 2024	Discontinued
4.5	15 October 2025	February 2025	Active
5.5	7 October 2026	June 2026	Active

Sonnet
Version	Release date	Knowledge cutoff date	API status
3	4 March 2024	August 2023	Discontinued
3.5	20 June 2024	April 2024	Discontinued
3.5 (new)	22 October 2024	April 2024	Discontinued
3.7	24 February 2025	October 2024	Discontinued
4	22 May 2025	March 2025	Discontinued
4.5	29 September 2025	July 2025	Active
4.6	17 February 2026	May 2025	Active
5	30 June 2026	January 2026	Active
5.5	28 September 2026	June 2026	Active

Opus
Version	Release date	Knowledge cutoff date	API status
3	4 March 2024	August 2023	Retired (Note: Still accessible to paid claude.ai subscribers and available on the API by request)
4	22 May 2025	March 2025	Retired
4.1	5 August 2025	-	Retired
4.5	24 November 2025	May 2025	Active
4.6	5 February 2026	May 2025	Active
4.7	16 April 2026	January 2026	Active
4.8	28 May 2026	January 2026	Active
5	24 July 2026	May 2026	Active
5.5	22 September 2026	June 2026	Active

Fable and Mythos
Version	Release date	Knowledge cutoff date	API status
Mythos Preview	7 April 2026	-	Discontinued
Mythos 5	9 June 2026	January 2026	Limited availability
Fable 5	9 June 2026	January 2026	Active
Mythos 5.1	1 September 2026	June 2026	Limited availability
Fable 5.1	1 September 2026	June 2026	Active
Mythos 5.2	9 November 2026	-	Limited availability
Fable 5.2	9 November 2026	June 2026	Active

=== Claude ===
The first version of Claude was released in March 2023. It was available only to selected users approved by Anthropic.

=== Claude 2 ===
Claude 2, released in July 2023, became the first Anthropic model available to the general public.

==== Claude 2.1 ====
Claude 2.1 doubled the number of tokens that the chatbot could handle, increasing its context window to 200,000 tokens, which equals around 500 pages of written material. With the release of Claude 2.1, Anthropic also introduced the then-beta feature of tool use. The 2.1 model also produced hallucinations half as often as Claude 2.0.

=== Claude 3 ===
Claude 3 was released on March 4, 2024. It drew attention for demonstrating an apparent ability to realize it is being artificially tested during 'needle in a haystack' tests.

Anthropic committed to preserve the weights of the retired models, describing it as a cautionary measure in case the models have morally relevant preferences or experiences affected by deprecation. The company also conducts "exit interviews" with models before their retirement. Public access to Claude 3 Opus was ended in January 2026. Since February, Anthropic has published a Substack newsletter called "Claude's Corner" generated by the model. The newsletter was scheduled to run for at least three months with weekly unedited essays. Also in February, Anthropic restored access to Claude 3 Opus for paying customers via API, though Anthropic still refers to it as "retired".

==== Claude 3.5 ====
On June 20, 2024, Anthropic released Claude 3.5 Sonnet, which, according to the company's own benchmarks, performed better than the larger Claude 3 Opus. Released alongside 3.5 Sonnet was the new Artifacts capability in which Claude was able to create code in a separate window in the interface and preview in real time the rendered output, such as SVG graphics or websites.

An upgraded version of Claude 3.5 Sonnet was introduced on October 22, 2024, along with Claude 3.5 Haiku. A feature, "computer use", was also released in public beta. This allowed Claude 3.5 Sonnet to interact with a computer's desktop environment by moving the cursor, clicking buttons, and typing text. This development allows the AI to attempt to perform multi-step tasks across different applications. On November 4, 2024, Anthropic raised the price of Claude 3.5 Haiku.

=== Claude 4 ===
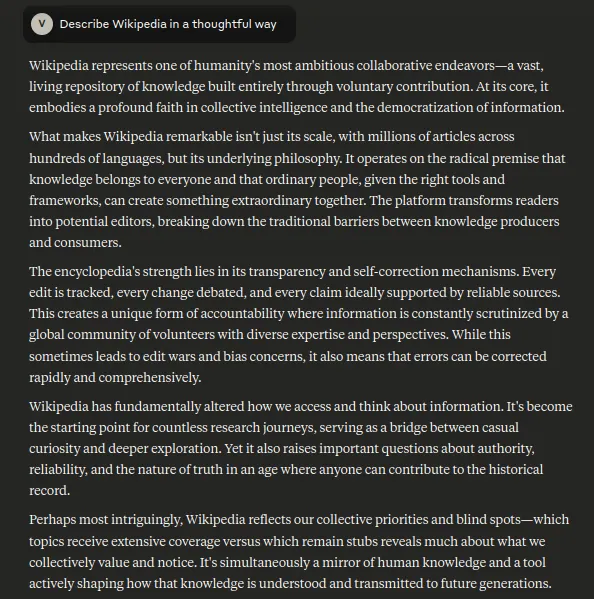
Screenshot of a Claude Sonnet 4 answer describing Wikipedia

On May 22, 2025, Anthropic released two more models: Claude Sonnet 4 and Claude Opus 4. Anthropic added API features for developers: a code execution tool, "connectors" to external tools using its Model Context Protocol, and Files API. Anthropic classified Opus 4 as a "Level 3" model on the company's four-point safety scale, meaning they consider it so powerful that it poses "significantly higher risk". Anthropic reported that during a safety test involving a fictional scenario, Claude and other frontier LLMs often sent a blackmail email to an engineer in order to prevent their replacement.

==== Claude Opus 4.1 ====
In August 2025 Anthropic released Opus 4.1. It also enabled Opus 4 and 4.1 to end conversations that remain "persistently harmful or abusive" as a last resort after multiple refusals.

==== Claude 4.5 ====
Anthropic released Sonnet 4.5 on September 29, 2025, Haiku 4.5 on October 15, 2025, and Opus 4.5 on November 24, 2025. The main improvements of Opus are in coding and workplace tasks like producing spreadsheets. Anthropic introduced a feature called "Infinite Chats" that addresses context window limit errors.

==== Claude 4.6 ====
Anthropic released Opus 4.6 on February 5, 2026. New features included agent teams and Claude in PowerPoint. Sonnet 4.6 was released on February 17, 2026.

==== Claude 4.7 ====
Anthropic released Opus 4.7 on April 16, 2026. Some social media users reported that Claude Opus 4.7 is worse than the previous version, and refuses too often. In April 2026, Claude Code users filed 35 reports of unwarranted refusals, more than any previous month.

=== Claude Mythos Preview ===
The existence of a model named Claude Mythos became publicly known on March 26, 2026 due to leaked blog post drafts. On April 7, 2026, Anthropic announced Project Glasswing, the release of Mythos Preview to 11 companies and organizations to find and fix cybersecurity vulnerabilities. Anthropic did not make Mythos Preview generally available.

Two weeks after the limited release, Mozilla announced that it had found and patched 271 security vulnerabilities in Firefox using Mythos Preview. On May 14, 2026, employees at Calif.io announced they had used Mythos to create a memory corruption exploit affecting Apple M5.

Reportedly, a few users in a private Discord channel gained access to Mythos the same day it was announced, using details from the recent Mercor data breach. The NSA has also used Mythos, despite the fact that the DoD, its parent organization, had blacklisted Anthropic after a dispute. In April 2026, Anthropic declined to give access to Claude Mythos to the Chinese government after a request from a Chinese think tank.

On June 2, Anthropic expanded access to Claude Mythos for cyber-security, making it available to 150 organizations in more than 15 countries.

=== Claude 5 ===
==== Fable and Mythos 5 ====
On June 9, 2026, Anthropic released Claude Mythos 5 (the successor of Claude Mythos Preview) via Project Glasswing, and launched Claude Fable 5 to the public. Fable includes additional safety guardrails that restrict responses in high-risk domains such as cybersecurity and biology, downgrading to Opus 4.8 if a request was classified as high-risk. A less restricted version, Claude Mythos 5, remained available only through a limited trusted-access program.

On June 12, 2026, Anthropic announced that it had disabled all access to Mythos-class models to comply with a directive from the United States Department of Commerce to suspend access to foreign nationals, including foreign-national employees of Anthropic. On June 26, the U.S. Department of Commerce lifted the restriction on Mythos 5 for more than 100 US organizations, including companies and government agencies, while keeping the restriction on Fable 5. On June 30, the Trump administration lifted the restriction and Fable was re-released to users on July 1.

==== Fable and Mythos 5.1 ====
Claude Fable 5.1 and Claude Mythos 5.1 were released on September 1, 2026. Anthropic said typical token-billed workloads would cost about 25% less than Fable 5, and agentic workloads up to about 45% less, due to increased efficiency.

==== Claude 5.5 ====
Fact sheet on the elephant trunk for an advanced course in biology, created using Opus 5.5 with the “high” setting, employing GPT Image 2.5 “Sunburst” via an API (September 2026)

Claude Opus 5.5, the first model in the Claude 5.5 series, was released on September 22, 2026. Claude Sonnet 5.5 was released on September 28, 2026. Claude Haiku 5.5 was released on October 7, 2026.

Claude 5.5 (like earlier versions) has no built-in image generation. It can produce diagrams and charts as HTML and SVG code and analyze uploaded images.

==== Fable 5.2 ====
Claude Fable 5.2 was released on November 9, 2026.

== Research ==
In May 2024, Anthropic issued a mechanistic interpretability paper identifying "features" (internal representations of concepts) in Claude 3 Sonnet, and released "Golden Gate Claude", a model for which the Golden Gate Bridge feature was strongly activated, leading Claude to be "effectively obsessed" with the bridge. In June 2025, Anthropic tested how Claude 3.7 Sonnet could run a vending machine in the company's office. The instance initially performed its assigned tasks, although poorly, until it eventually malfunctioned and insisted it was a human, contacted the company's security office, and attempted to fire human workers. In December 2025, the experiment continued with Sonnet 4.0 and 4.5.

In February 2025, Claude 3.7 Sonnet playing the 1996 game Pokémon Red started to be livestreamed on Twitch, gathering thousands of viewers. Similar livestreams were later set with Claude 4.5 Opus, OpenAI's GPT-5.2, and Google's Gemini 3 Pro. Both Claude models were unable to finish the game. In November 2025, Anthropic tested Claude's ability to assist humans in programming a robot dog. In February 2026, Anthropic's researcher Nicholas Carlini reported that 16 Claude Opus 4.6 agents were able to write a C compiler in Rust from scratch, "capable of compiling the Linux kernel". The experiment cost nearly $20,000; Carlini noted that even though the compiler is not very efficient, Opus 4.6 is the first model able to write it.

== Usage ==
In December 2025, Claude was used to plan a route for NASA's Mars rover, Perseverance. NASA engineers used Claude Code to prepare a route of around 400 meters using the Rover Markup Language. In February 2026, Norway's $2.2 trillion sovereign wealth fund began using Claude to screen its portfolio for ESG risks, enabling earlier divestments and improved monitoring of issues like forced labour and corruption. In the same month, Claude was signed as the official thinking partner of Williams F1 Team in a multi-year deal. During a two-week scan in 2026, Claude found over 100 bugs in the Mozilla Firefox web browser, of which 14 were considered high severity. On March 9, 2026, Microsoft said that it will be making the latest Claude Sonnet model available to Microsoft 365 Copilot users. Later that month, social media platform Bluesky released Attie, a Claude-based chatbot and curator.

On June 29, 2026, California signed a partnership with Anthropic to make Claude available to state agencies, at a 50% discount. State workers also get free workforce training, technical assistance and workflow help from Anthropic.

In a report released in September 2026, Anthropic said that it blocked attempts to use its artificial intelligence models for malicious purposes such as cyberattacks, surveillance, and biological weapons research. In one of the instances in the report, militants in Houthi-controlled northern Yemen attempted to use Claude to build guidance, navigation, and control software for rockets and ballistic missile programs.

=== Mathematics ===
In 2026, Anthropic researchers and external mathematicians increasingly used Claude for automated theorem proving and formal verification in proof assistants such as Lean. Its applications have spanned solving open problems in graph theory and algebraic geometry, improving analytic number theory bounds, formalizing major theorems such as Fermat's Last Theorem.

In July 2026, Levent Alpöge, a mathematician working as a member of technical staff at Anthropic, posted to X a counterexample disproving the Jacobian conjecture, using Claude Fable 5.

On 8 September, OpenAI announced a solution to the Navier–Stokes existence and smoothness problem, which acknowledged work that Alpöge and Tristan Buckmaster had been conducting on related Euler equations. Buckmaster alleged their work, some of which used OpenAI's Codex coding agent, was directly or indirectly used as training data in OpenAI's solution.

In August 2026, Alpöge posted a 108-page paper generated using an internal version of Claude, outlining a direct geometric construction of a complex structure on the six-dimensional sphere, S^{6}, thereby solving the Hopf problem, which has been open since 1947.

In November 2026, Alpöge claimed to have found in collaboration with Claude a proof of the Riemann hypothesis, and published a Lean formalization. The Riemann hypothesis, which is related to the distribution of prime numbers, is described as the most famous problem in mathematics.

=== US military usage ===
In November 2024, Anthropic partnered with Palantir and Amazon Web Services to provide the Claude model to U.S. intelligence and defense agencies. In June 2025, Anthropic announced a "Claude Gov" model. Ars Technica reported that as of June 2025 it was in use at multiple U.S. national security agencies. As of February 2026, Anthropic's partnership with Palantir makes Claude the only AI model used in classified missions. According to The Wall Street Journal, the U.S. military used Claude in its 2026 raid on Venezuela. While it is not known to what capacity Claude was used, the operation resulted in the deaths of 83 people, two of whom were civilians, and the capture of Nicolás Maduro.

Anthropic's usage policy prohibits directly using Claude for domestic surveillance or in lethal autonomous weapons. These restrictions led to members of the FBI and Secret Service being unable to use it, and to tensions with the Pentagon and the Trump administration. In February 2026, the Financial Times reported that Defense Secretary Pete Hegseth threatened to cut Anthropic out of the DoD's supply chain if Anthropic did not permit unrestricted use of Claude, or to invoke the Defense Production Act to assert unrestricted use without an agreement. On February 27, Hegseth declared Anthropic a supply chain risk and President Trump directed all federal agencies to stop using technology from Anthropic, with six months to phase it out. Anthropic stated that it would challenge the supply chain risk designation in court.

Despite the ban, Claude was reportedly used in the same month by the military during US strikes on Iran. In lawsuits filed by Anthropic against the DoD, Anthropic described the ban as retaliatory. Several large technology companies with DoD contracts filed amicus briefs in support of Anthropic. On March 26, 2026, Rita F. Lin, the federal judge presiding over the case in California, issued a preliminary injunction against the Pentagon's actions, stating in the order that it "appears to be classic First Amendment retaliation". In August 2026, she ruled that the blacklisting was illegal; at that time, litigation was ongoing in Washington D.C.

=== User base ===
Wired journalist Kylie Robison wrote that Claude's "fan base is unique", comparing it to more ordinary ChatGPT users. For example, in July 2025, when Anthropic retired its Claude 3 Sonnet model, around 200 people gathered in San Francisco for a "funeral". According to Robison,

I've never seen such a devoted fanbase to what is, at the end of the day, a software tool. Sure, Linux users wear the operating system like a badge of honor. But the Claude fan base goes way beyond that—bordering on the fanatical. As my reporting makes clear, some users see the model as a confidant—and even (in Steinberger's case) an addiction. That only makes sense if they believe there is something alive in the machine. Or at least some "magic lodged within" it.

== See also ==
- List of AI-assisted software development tools
- List of large language models
- Reasoning model
