= Bad Times (song) =

AI-generated 2026 single by Imael Angel

Single by Imael Angel
- Released: 30 March 2026
- Genre: Deep house
- Length: 2:48
- Label: Imael Angel
- Songwriter: Bernadett Gango
- Producer: Imael Angel

"Bad Times" is a deep house song generated with artificial intelligence (AI) and credited to UK-based Hungarian therapist Bernadett Gango, whose stage name is Imael Angel. The song was self-released on 30 March 2026.

== Background and virality ==
The song was generated by artificial intelligence and credited to Imael Angel, born Bernadett Gango, a Hungarian native Reiki master in England who produces deep house using Suno and Udio software programmes. "Bad Times" forms part of the world created by Gango's work as a therapist on meditation, energy and healing, which she incorporates into her deep house project she started in 2026. The song gradually gained popularity on social media, where it was regularly used as the soundtrack to various viral videos. After going viral on TikTok, the song debuted on the Billboard Canadian Hot 100 chart dated 3 October 2026. By 8 October 2026, the track had shot to the top of the global Shazam charts and was being streamed more than 500,000 times a day. The song also reached number two on the UK Singles Downloads Chart.

== Composition and lyrics ==
"Bad Times" is a deep house song with a tempo of 107.7 beats per minute in the key of F minor. Creating an atmosphere "between melancholy and electrifying energy", the song incorporates "evocative vocals", "atmospheric synthesisers" and a "deep house and dark pop rhythm". The record explores themes of heartbreak, past actions and the determination to move on, while lyrics are about self-esteem, healing, the feeling of being a victim, and working behind the scenes.

== Track listing ==
- Digital download and streaming
1. "Bad Times" – 2:48
- Digital download and streaming – extended version
1. "Bad Times" (extended version) – 6:40
- Digital download and streaming – dance remix
1. "Bad Times" (dance remix) – 3:08
- Digital download and streaming – Mssngrs extended club remix
1. "Bad Times" (Mssngrs extended club remix) – 5:14

== Charts ==
=== Weekly charts ===
Weekly chart performance for "Bad Times"
Chart (2026)	Peak position
Austria (Ö3 Austria Top 40)	71
Canada Hot 100 (Billboard)	69
France (SNEP)	148
Germany (GfK)	87
Global Excl. US (Billboard)	142
Greece International (IFPI)	21
Lithuania (AGATA)	39
Netherlands (Single Tip)	10
Norway (IFPI Norge)	97
Russia Streaming (TopHit)	7
Switzerland (Schweizer Hitparade)	18
UK Singles (Official Charts)	67
UK Dance (Official Charts)	16
UK Indie (Official Charts)	27
US Digital Song Sales (Billboard)	3
US Hot Dance/Electronic Songs (Billboard)	8

=== Monthly charts ===
Monthly chart performance for "Bad Times"
Chart (2026)	Peak position
Russia Streaming (TopHit)	95
