= Find Your Rest =

Single by Solomon Ray

from the EP Faithful Soul
- Released: October 20, 2025
- Genre: Gospel; soul
- Length: 3:58
- Label: Independent
- Songwriters: Christopher Townsend; ChatGPT
- Producer: Suno AI

Solomon Ray singles chronology
"Find Your Rest" (2025)	"Do It With Soul" (2025)

"Find Your Rest" is an AI-generated song by Christopher "Topher" Townsend released under the stage name Solomon Ray. The song was released independently on October 20, 2025, as the lead single from Ray's debut extended play, Faithful Soul. The song was written by Townsend in collaboration with ChatGPT, mixed and mastered by Townsend, and composed and produced by Suno AI. The song saw a significant negative reception from the public. It peaked at No. 11 on the Billboard Digital Song Sales chart, No. 3 on the Hot Gospel Songs chart, and No. 1 on the Gospel Digital Song Sales chart.

== Background ==
Text, photos, videos, and music developed by generative artificial intelligence programs like ChatGPT had become widespread on online platforms like Twitter, Facebook, Instagram, TikTok, and YouTube. These AI programs have been blamed for causing these platforms to be filled with perceived low-quality artificial content, nicknamed "AI slop". AI-generated music, produced by software like Suno, has been criticized for copying elements and motifs from copyrighted music made by humans, and for frequently featuring a "robotic" vocal "accent".

== Production and development ==
Townsend was inspired to create artificial intelligence-generated music after hearing about Xania Monet and Timbaland, who had each done the same. Ray's voice was developed using a computer software. It was co-written between Townsend and ChatGPT. The song itself was generated by Suno AI, an artificial intelligence music generator. Townsend mixed and mastered using a website called Landr. While Suno has a built-in generator for song lyrics, he did not use it to avoid copyright issues.

Townsend wrote the song after he called and spoke with his sister and realized that "her heart was heavy." "Find Your Rest" is based on the Bible verse Matthew 11:28, which says, "Come to me, all you who are weary and burdened, and I will give you rest." The song is composed in the key of C major with a speed of 73 beats per minute and a time signature of 4/4. It demonstrates the styles of Gospel and soul music.

== Reception ==
=== Commercial ===
"Find Your Rest" saw its chart debut on the week dated for November 15, 2025. It debuted at No. 18 on the Billboard Hot Gospel Songs chart and No. 2 on the Gospel Digital Song Sales chart. The following week, supported by the release of the extended play Faithful Soul, the song jumped twelve positions to reach No. 6 on the Hot Gospel Songs and one position to lead the Gospel Digital Song Sales. It entered the overall Digital Song Sales at No. 16. The week of November 29, 2025, the song reached its peak position of No. 3 on the Hot Gospel Songs and No. 11 on the Digital Song Sales. The song also led the iTunes Christian Songs chart. Concurrently, the EP, Faithful Soul, led the Christian Albums chart, making Ray the first artificial intelligence musician to achieve both peaks at once.

=== Public ===
In spite of its immediate success, the song received negative backlash. Christian pop singer Forrest Frank argued that because Ray was not human, his songs "don’t count as art", saying that, "At minimum, AI does not have the Holy Spirit inside of it. So I think that it’s really weird to be opening up your spirit to something that has no spirit". Townsend responded, saying that, "Who am I to say what God will or won’t use to get the message his people need to them? I’m just here to be an instrument. This is an extension of my creativity, so therefore to me it’s art. It’s definitely inspired by a Christian. It may not be performed by one, but I don’t know why that really matters in the end." Another musician who releases music under the name Solomon Ray criticized that "no creative choices are really being made," and that no effort is being put into the creation of the music. It was also criticized that no disclaimer was made on streaming platforms that the song was generated by artificial intelligence, and the musician being marketed as a "Mississippi-made singer."

== Personnel ==
Credits adapted from Tidal Music.

- Christopher Townsend – writer, mixing, mastering
- ChatGPT – writer
- Suno AI – composer, producer

== Charts ==
Weekly chart performance for "Find Your Rest"
Chart (2025)	Peak position
US Digital Song Sales (Billboard)	11
US Hot Gospel Songs (Billboard)	3
