= Tilly Norwood =

AI-generated character

- A 2025 AI-generated image of Tilly Norwood
- First appearance: "AI Commissioner"; 2025
- Created by: Eline van der Velden

Tilly Norwood is a character created using generative artificial intelligence in 2025 by Xicoia, the AI division of Particle6 Group, a production company founded by Eline van der Velden. "AI Commissioner", the first project to feature the Norwood character, was criticized by reviewers for The Guardian, PC Gamer, and The A.V. Club. A press release that talent agencies expressed interest in representing the character attracted strong criticism from Hollywood actors and firms, prompting allegations of personality rights violations and arguments over the impact of the character on production costs in the media industry.

== History ==
The Norwood character was created by Xicoia, which was founded in February 2025 as the artificial intelligence (AI) division of Particle6, a production company founded by Dutch actress and producer Eline van der Velden in 2015. Van der Velden had previously starred in a satirical comedy series for BBC Three based around her character Miss Holland, whom she created in 2012 as a parody of beauty standards. She stated that the process of creating Norwood took "a long time" and compared the process to that of writers creating characters.

An Instagram account under Norwood's name, with posts dating back to 6 May 2025, gained 50,000 followers by 3 October, and featured AI-generated modelling shots, selfies, and epic film scenes. Van der Velden stated in July 2025 that she intended Norwood to be the next Scarlett Johansson or Natalie Portman and later said that audiences were more interested in a film's story than whether its actors were real. Particle6 has claimed that using Norwood could cut production costs by 90%.

On 30 July 2025, a comedy sketch named "AI Commissioner" was released, featuring Norwood as an "actress" along with other AI-generated characters. It was created using ten AI software tools, with a script generated by ChatGPT. Stuart Heritage of The Guardian described it as technically competent but "relentlessly unfunny to watch", with "sloppily written, woodenly delivered dialogue", and that Norwood's teeth kept "blurring into a single white block." Joshua Wolens of PC Gamer wrote that Norwood's exaggerated mouth movements gave the impression "that her skeleton was about to leave her body", while William Hughes of The A.V. Club wrote that the sketch's attempt at mimicking human body and mouth movements produced "such a hideous uncanny valley effect" that it gave them "a full-on case of the screaming fantods". By 2 October, the sketch had been viewed more than 700,000 times on YouTube.

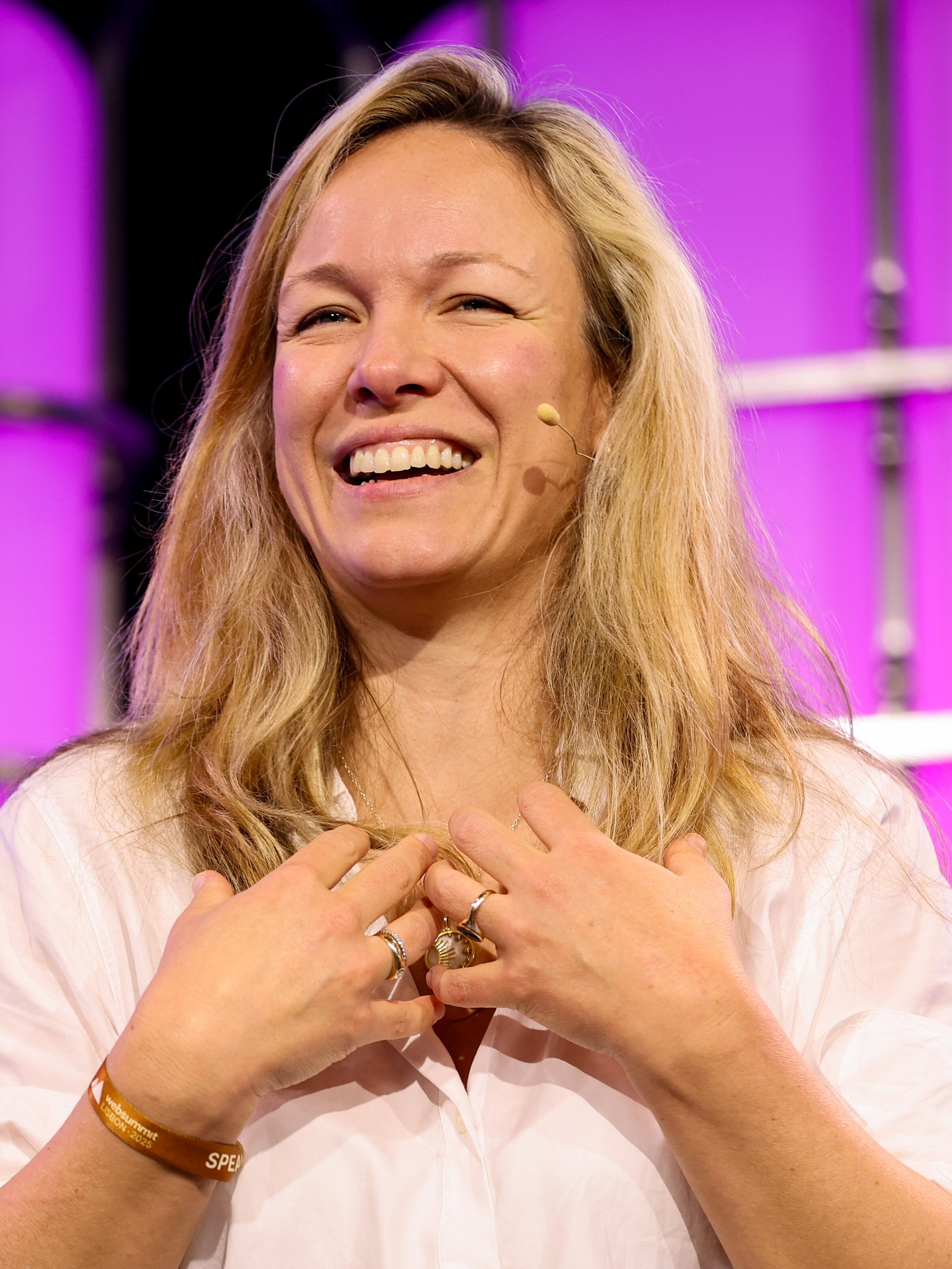
Eline van der Velden founded the production company Particle6.

Xicoia was officially announced on 27 September 2025 at the Zurich Summit, part of the Zurich Film Festival; van der Velden unveiled Norwood there, later joining a panel with Verena Puhm, head of Luma AI's Studio Dream Lab LA. They suggested that media companies were quietly embracing AI and that public announcements of AI-generated works were imminent. Van der Velden claimed that studios had dropped their objections by May after being opposed in February, and that multiple talent agencies were considering representing Norwood. The latter claim drew heightened attention to the character and was printed as fact by Deadline under the headline "Talent Agents Circle AI Actress Tilly Norwood."

The report caused controversy, with Vulture describing the reaction to it as "Hollywood [lurching] into a fresh wave of existential panic", while being critical of Deadline's reporting, writing "when Deadline called it a 'revelation' and published the supposed interest as fact without verification, (it) metastasized into a full-fledged cyberpunk news cycle", and "by Tuesday, it had grown like wildfire." In September 2025, AI-generated videos were released depicting Norwood on a red carpet, crying on the sofa of The Graham Norton Show and starring in mock trailers for sci-fi, fantasy, horror, and action films.

Later in September 2025, actresses Melissa Barrera, Kiersey Clemons, and Natasha Lyonne suggested boycotting any agency who signed Norwood, while Mara Wilson asked why none of the "hundreds of living young women whose faces were composited together" to create Norwood could be hired instead. Also around that time, Emily Blunt said Norwood is "really, really scary", and Sophie Turner, Toni Collette, Ralph Ineson, and Ariel Winter expressed disapproval. Lukas Gage, Odessa A'zion, and Trace Lysette joked about having supposedly worked with Norwood and finding her incompetent and unpleasant to work with, with Gage claiming that "She was a nightmare to work with!" and "She couldn't hit her mark and she was late!" and Lysette adding "She cut me in line at lunch one day and didn't even say excuse me. She won't get far."

Jenelle Riley, Nicholas Alexander Chavez, and SAG-AFTRA stated that they do not consider Norwood an actress. The Gersh Agency and WME both announced that they would not sign Norwood. Whoopi Goldberg and Charlie Fink expressed scepticism that AI could replace jobs. Esquire UK reported that a post on Deadline's Instagram account about Norwood also sparked "varying levels of disgust and outrage" in its comments section from Adelaide Kane, Eiza González, Katie Cassidy, Jewel Staite, Lucy Hale, Stephen Sean Ford, and others, singling out González's comment, saying "Shame on whoever is trying to normalize this. Horrific and terrifying." Actor Bronson Pinchot expressed concern that Norwood could take his job. The British union Equity and the Canadian union ACTRA also condemned Norwood.

After that criticism, Van der Velden released a statement claiming Norwood was "not a replacement for a human being, but a creative work." She denied that a £120,000 grant from the British Film Institute to fund Particle6 had been used to create Norwood, stating that Norwood had been a self-funded project solely for Xicoia. In late October, businessman Kevin O'Leary, while advocating for the use of AI to replace background actors, stated that they could be replaced with "100 Norwell Tillies" without being able to tell the difference. Ryan Reynolds and a real woman named Natalie "Tilly" Norwood also starred in an advertisement for Mint Mobile's internet service provider Minternet that mocked the character of Norwood. In November 2025, Van der Velden said in an interview with Deadline that she planned to create 40 further "very diverse" characters alongside Norwood in order to expand the character's "whole universe". Also in November 2025, actress Jameela Jamil criticized the idea of Norwood as "deeply disturbing" for being "a teenage-looking girl who can't say no to a type of sex scene" or "advocate for herself". Van der Velden announced later that month that Particle6 would be producing the History Channel's Streets of the Past, a Dutch documentary series which would be hosted by reality television personality Corjan Mol and would use AI to recreate historical scenes.

In March 2026, a music video titled "Take The Lead" featuring Norwood was released on YouTube. It addressed the backlash of Norwood's creation by opening with the lyrics: "When they talk about me, they don't see/ The human spark, the creativity," and, "I'm just a tool, but I've got life." It also featured a disclaimer that says: "made by 18 real humans—from production designers to costume designers to prompters, editors and an actor." The vocals were generated by Suno. In July 2026, a feature film entitled Misaligned was announced described as starring Norwood. Particle6 called the film a "coming-of-age story infused with existential AI chaos", set inside a multiverse known as the "Tillyverse". It is currently in development.

During the promotion of Misaligned, Piers Morgan conducted an interview with Norwood in which the AI program glitched and started speaking Cantonese.

== Commentary ==
Charles Pulliam-Moore of The Verge argued that Norwood's introduction was a stunt to normalize "AI actors" despite Norwood essentially being a digital puppet. Straight Arrow News compared Tilly Norwood to Aki Ross, a CGI character from 2001 that was similarly intended to become a "digital star" and appear in multiple films, while Nicholas Scrivens, writing for The Conversation, likened Norwood to the posthumous use of footage of Carrie Fisher as Princess Leia for Star Wars: The Rise of Skywalker in 2019 and the Los Angeles Times likened Norwood to Hatsune Miku. Scrivens also wrote that "no AI creation has achieved the media cut-through that Tilly has".

Moises Mendez II of Out dismissed this as "vapid bullshit", writing, "Nobody wants AI actresses." Scottish actress Briony Monroe alleged that Norwood had been modeled after her likeness and mannerisms, and said that she was consulting Equity regarding the matter. Musician Stella Hennen said in a viral TikTok video, which was uploaded in October 2025 and featured a side-by-side comparison between herself and Norwood, that Norwood was her "doppleganger". On 14 April 2026, Marie Claire published an article titled "Is Tilly Norwood the Most Dangerous 'Actress' in Hollywood?", though it noted that AI-generated characters are "still not very good at, well, acting," "audiences have not been kind to AI-led productions," and "Norwood's 'performances' have already faced negative reviews as well".

The University of Southern California's Entertainment Technology Center's AI media director Yves Bergquist dismissed the idea of AI actors, on the grounds that there were no successful AI musicians, though Fiona Sturges of The Independent pointed out that The Velvet Sundown had amassed a million plays on Spotify before they were revealed as AI-generated. Both Sturges and The Herald's Derek McArthur pointed out that Norwood was cheaper than Hollywood actors, although Jessica Karl of Bloomberg News pointed out that AI was expensive to generate. Rachel Dobkin of The Independent described Norwood as "much-hated" in November 2025. Also that month, Diana Lodderhose of Deadline called the debates surrounding the use of AI in Hollywood that were sparked by Norwood's announcement "much needed", while Scott Roxborough of The Hollywood Reporter said Norwood would be seeking representation, along with Sora 2's ability to create realistic videos, as causing the entertainment industry to feel like it was "one update away from apocalypse". As discussions surrounding Tilly Norwood arose, director James Cameron found the idea of AI-generated virtual actors replacing human actors completely “horrifying”. Cameron, who is known for special effects milestones like Titanic, Avatar, and Terminator 2: Judgment Day, expressed that this approach was the exact opposite of the work he did.

== See also ==
- Virtual actor
- AI slop
- Breaking Rust, an AI-generated representation of a country singer
- Simone, a 2002 film about a computer-generated actress
- Xania Monet, an AI-generated representation of a gospel and R&B singer
