= IngaRose =

AI-generated musical act

- Origin: United States
- Genres: R&B; soul; pop
- Years active: 2026–present
- Label: Myers Music
- Website: instagram.com/ingarosemusic

IngaRose is an artificial intelligence–generated musical act that briefly topped the United States and global iTunes sales charts in April 2026 with the song "Celebrate Me". Presented online as a female R&B and soul vocalist, the project has no corresponding real-life performer; its music is produced using the generative AI platform Suno. Journalistic investigations have attributed IngaRose, along with a number of other virtual artists, to a South Carolina–based producer named Dallas Little.

The act's commercial success became a prominent flashpoint in ongoing debates about the role of generative AI in the music industry, the vulnerability of digital sales charts to synthetic content, and the ethics of AI models trained on copyrighted recordings.

== Background ==
IngaRose began releasing music in early 2026. According to reporting by Forbes and other outlets, the project has issued a steady stream of singles throughout the year, accompanied by video content on YouTube and short-form clips on TikTok and Instagram. The project's Instagram biography states that the songs use "Human written lyrics, Real stories" with "Stems & arrangement refined using Suno", and includes an invitation to human singers and songwriters to collaborate.

IngaRose is part of a broader wave of AI-generated "artists" that appeared on digital music services during 2025 and 2026. Commentators have compared the project to Eddie Dalton, an earlier AI-generated blues and soul performer that placed multiple songs simultaneously on the iTunes top 100, and to Breaking Rust, an AI country act that previously reached number one on the Billboard Digital Song Sales chart.

== "Celebrate Me" and chart success ==
IngaRose's breakthrough single, "Celebrate Me", was released on March 31, 2026, through the label Myers Music. The track initially gained traction on TikTok, where it was used in more than 300,000 user videos, before converting that attention into paid downloads. By April 17, 2026, chart trackers showed "Celebrate Me" at number one on both the US and global iTunes sales charts, and the song also reached the top position on iTunes charts in the United Kingdom, France, Canada, and New Zealand.

Thematically, the song presents a message of self-reliance and personal resilience, encouraging listeners to acknowledge their own role in overcoming hardship. Despite its chart performance on iTunes, the single did not generate comparable impact on streaming services such as Spotify or Apple Music's own streaming charts at the time of its peak.

== Online presentation ==
IngaRose is marketed online in the manner of a conventional pop or R&B artist, with an Apple Music artist page, a growing catalog of 2026 singles, and active social media accounts. The project's Instagram account had accumulated roughly 228,000 to 246,000 followers by mid-April 2026. The account's branding openly references synthetic production rather than attempting to conceal it.

Following the success of "Celebrate Me", the account posted a message thanking listeners and framing the song as an invitation to self-affirmation. A follow-up single, "Feeling Good Today", was scheduled for early April 2026, and a later track titled "Her Truth" was subsequently released.

== Attribution and creator ==
Although IngaRose is presented as a solo artist, reporting by Showbiz411 and other outlets has attributed the project to Dallas Little, a producer based in Greenville, South Carolina. Little has also been identified as the person behind Eddie Dalton, another AI-generated performer whose material has appeared repeatedly on iTunes charts. The connection between the two projects is based on their shared production methods and overlapping release patterns rather than on direct public acknowledgment.

== Reception and controversy ==
The rise of "Celebrate Me" drew sharp reactions from musicians, commentators, and listeners. Critics argued that the chart performance exposed iTunes to manipulation by bulk purchasing or bot-driven activity, and characterized the proliferation of AI-generated music as "slop" that crowds human artists out of visibility on digital platforms. Some observers framed the episode as an "invasion" of the charts and called for tighter regulation of AI-generated releases.

Supporters, including the project's creator, have defended the work as a transparent form of AI-assisted creativity, pointing to the Instagram disclosure that the songs are "refined using Suno". Suno itself has been the subject of ongoing criticism and litigation over allegations that its models were trained on copyrighted recordings; a "Say No to Suno" campaign was launched in February 2026 by artists opposed to the platform. In company statements, Suno has compared the training of its models to a learner studying music by listening widely, rejecting the characterization of neural networks as simple copying mechanisms.

Industry observers have noted that IngaRose's success mirrors earlier chart performances by AI-generated country act Breaking Rust and has intensified calls for chart bodies, streaming platforms, and record labels to develop clearer policies regarding synthetic performers.

== Discography ==
=== Selected singles ===
- "Celebrate Me" (March 31, 2026, Myers Music)
- "Feeling Good Today" (April 2026)
- "Her Truth" (2026)
