= Butterbro =

- Born: Josua Waghubinger
- Genres: Pop
- Occupation: Producer

Josua Waghubinger is an Austrian producer living in Germany. He is known by his stage name Butterbro (a blend word of Butterbrot and Bro). His single "Verknallt in einen Talahon" about a German girl in love with an Arab immigrant who is a stereotypical talahon, was generated with the AI music service Udio. It became the first AI-generated song in the German single charts.

== Discography ==
- 2024: "Verknallt in einen Talahon"
