= Aki Ross =

Animated film character

- Final Fantasy character
- Developed by Square, Aki Ross was intended to be the first artificial actress
- First appearance: Final Fantasy: The Spirits Within
- Created by: Hironobu Sakaguchi
- Portrayed by: EN: Ming-Na Wen; JA: Keiko Toda

Aki Ross (Japanese: アキ・ロス, Hepburn: Aki Rosu) is a fictional character and the protagonist of the American animated science fiction film Final Fantasy: The Spirits Within. Aki Ross is voiced by Chinese American actress Ming-Na Wen. She was expected to be the first photorealistic computer-generated virtual actress to appear in multiple movies in different roles.

== Creation and design ==
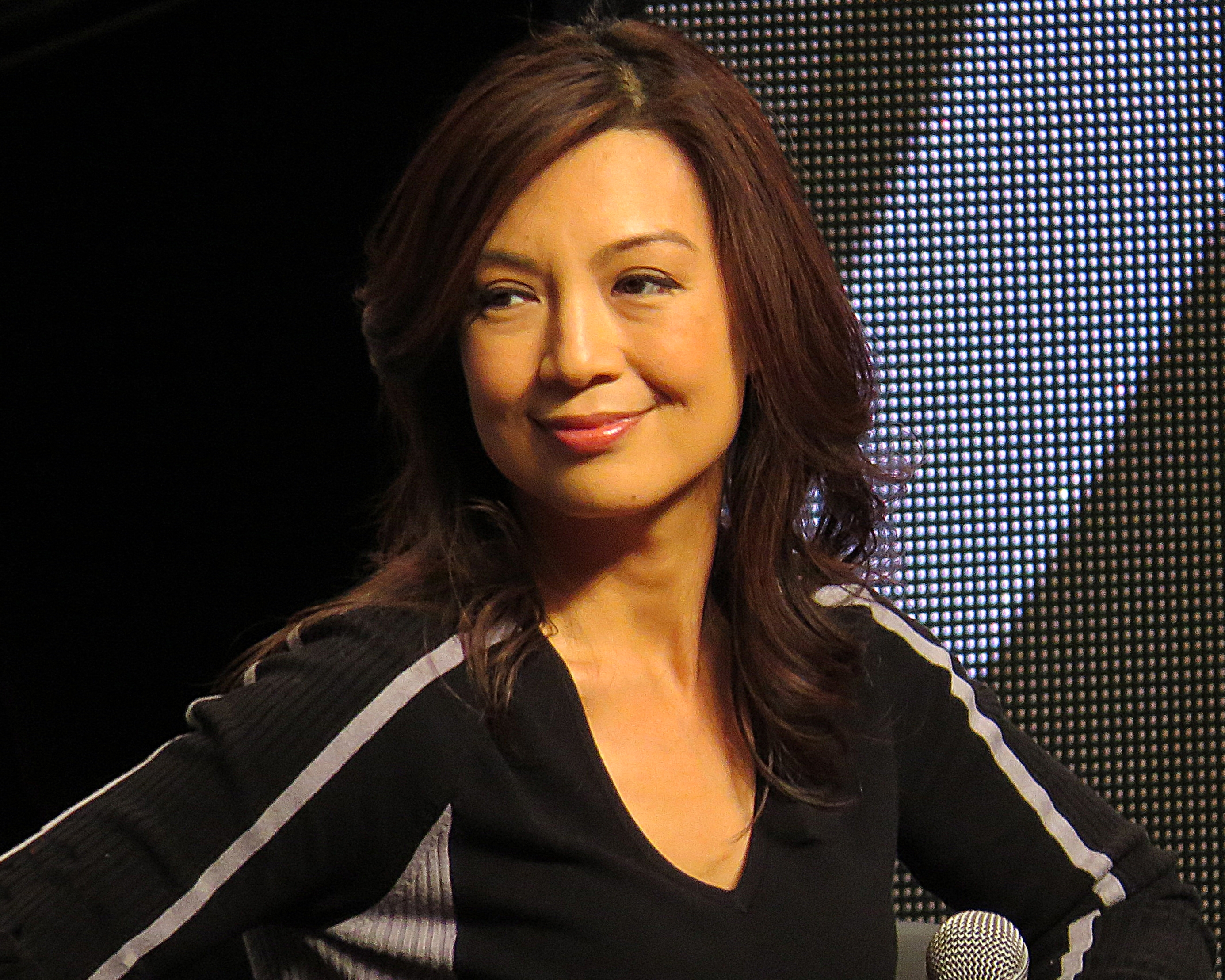
Ming-Na Wen, Aki's voice actress, was selected by Sakaguchi because he felt she fit the character's personality.

Aki Ross is a fictional character created by Hironobu Sakaguchi for Square Pictures under Square, for the purpose of use in their debut film The Spirits Within. The model designed for Aki was designed to be as realistically human as possible, with Sakaguchi commenting in an interview "I think it's OK to look at Aki and be convinced that she's a human." Each of her 60,000 hairs was separately and fully animated and rendered, at a render farm consisting of 960 Pentium III-933 MHz workstations that took 1.5 hours to render each frame, with the model estimated to be made up of around 400,000 polygons. Sakaguchi intended to have Aki be Square Picture's "main star", noting intentions to use her in later games and films by Square and the flexibility of being able to modify aspects of her such as her age for said appearances.

Aki's appearance was conceived by lead animator of the project, Roy Sato, who created several conceptual designs for Sakaguchi to consider and then used the selected design as a guide for her character model. During her development, he altered the model to appear more intelligent looking, shortening the hair and removing makeup from what he perceived as a "supermodel" looking character in favor of an appearance that would "convince people that she's a scientist." In an interview, Sato described actively trying to make her appear as realistic as possible, making her similar to himself in many ways that he could in terms of animation including elements of his personality through facial expressions, though noted "she's a lot cuter than me".

Wen found the role via her publicist and said she felt like she "has given birth with [her] voice to a character" and that it was a little "eerie". She added that it was difficult to work without the presence and spontaneity of real actors; however, she gradually accustomed herself to this feeling, and noted that the voice-acting work did not take much time, as she would just go into the studio "once or twice a month for about four months" with no need for make-up and costuming sessions, continuing to play in the television series ER during the works on the film. After completion of the film, Wen noted that she would be willing to continue voicing if she were asked to.

== Appearances ==
First appearing in Final Fantasy: The Spirits Within, Aki Ross is a scientist in the fictional post-apocalyptic mid-21st century who has been infected by a race of aliens called Phantoms. The Phantoms first appeared after a meteor, later revealed to be part of their home world, crash lands on Earth. The Phantoms cause mass casualties, and drive the remnants of humanity into "barrier cities". Ross allied herself with the "Deep Eyes Squad," a specialist troop of soldiers who are determined to eradicate the Phantoms. Aki is charged with finding the eight spirits; it is theorized that when joined, the eight spirits will create a wavelength that negates the Phantoms. Gray, Ross's love interest and the leader of the Deep Eyes, sacrifices himself as a medium needed to physically transmit the completed spirit wavelength into the alien Gaia.

In 2002 she appeared in a demonstration video that Square Pictures made to present to the Wachowskis before developing Final Flight of the Osiris for The Animatrix. The short film, appearing amongst the DVD's bonus content and featuring her with a slightly modified design, shows her acrobatically dueling a robot from the Matrix setting. Shortly afterwards, Square Pictures was closed and absorbed into Square Co. and the company ceased use of the character, much to studio president Jun Aida's lament.

== Reception ==
Maxim's featuring of Aki in their "Hot 100" list resulted in increased media attention towards the character

Entertainment Weekly named Aki an "It Girl", stating that "calling this action heroine a cartoon would be like calling a Rembrandt a doodle." Her appearance has been received positively by critics, with praise for the finer details of the character model such as the rendering of her hair. The New York Times described her as having the "sinewy efficiency" of Aliens franchise character Ellen Ripley and visual appeal of Julia Roberts' portrayal of Erin Brockovich. Film critic Roger Ebert noted that while he didn't once feel convinced Aki Ross was an actual human being, he conceded she was "lifelike", stating her creators "dare us to admire their craft. If Aki is not as real as a human actress, she's about as real a Playmate who has been retouched to glossy perfection." The book Digital Shock: Confronting the New Reality described her as a virtual actress having a "beauty that is 'really' impressive", comparing her to video game character Lara Croft.

In contrast, Robot Ghosts and Wired Dreams criticized her character as an example of the constantly kidnapped female in Japanese cinema, further "diluted" by her existence solely as a computer-generated character representing "an ideal, cinematic female character that has no real referent". Action and Adventure Cinema described her as the "least overtly eroticised" female characters in science fiction, though noted her as an example of the treatment of such characters as pin-up girls and "transformed [...] into an erotic fantasy machine". Media Matrix: Sexing the New Reality noted the emphasis by her creators on making her appear real, though questioned the portrayal of her character, questioning if the presence of her unconsciousness in the film was intended as a means to have the character appear more human to viewers.

She appeared dressed in a bikini on the cover of Maxim, and was ranked by the magazine and its readers as one of the sexiest women of 2001, placing at No. 87 out of 100 and becoming the first fictional woman to ever make the list. The same image of her appeared in the "Babes: The Girls of Sci Fi" special issue of SFX.

In 2025, Straight Arrow News compared Aki Ross to Tilly Norwood, an AI-generated character that, like Ross, was intended to be a digital actor and appear in multiple films.

== See also ==
- Uncanny valley, the disbelief engendered by almost perfectly rendered humans in CGI
