= Topher (rapper) =

Independent American rapper, songwriter, and conservative commentator

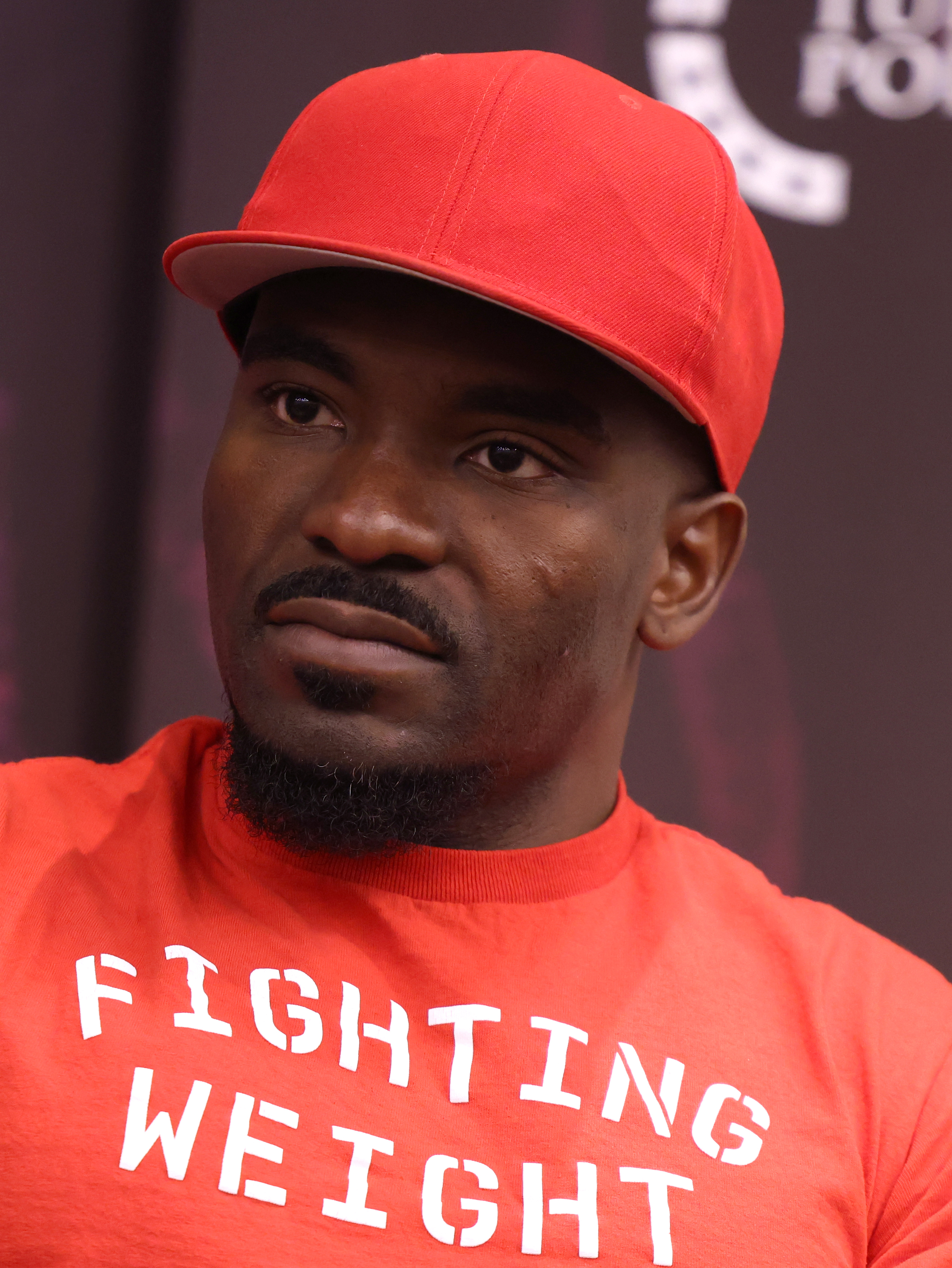
- Topher in 2024

Background information
- Also known as: Topher
- Born: Christopher Townsend; 1991 (age 34–35); Kilmichael, Mississippi
- Genre: Hip hop
- Occupations: Rapper; songwriter; political activist
- Years active: 2017–present
- Website: Official website

Christopher "Topher" Townsend (born 1991) is an independent American rapper, songwriter and conservative commentator.

== Early life and military ==
Christopher Townsend (born on February 22, 1991), better known as Topher, is an independent American rapper, songwriter, conservative political activist, and entrepreneur from Kilmichael, Mississippi. He graduated from Montgomery County High School in 2009.

Topher spent six years in the United States Air Force, where he was a cryptologic language analyst. He left in April 2017.

== Religious activism ==
Topher often used his TikTok platform to go around various public places, usually grocery stores, and quiz store patrons on their knowledge of the Bible. He told them if they could answer 3 questions about the Bible, he would give them $100.00. Whether the people answered correctly or not, he still gave them $100.00. Sometimes he would continue in conversation about the Bible with the people after he quizzed them.

== Political activism ==
Topher voted Republican in the 2016 presidential election.

Frustrated with backlash on Facebook, Topher began using TikTok to discuss political issues in December 2019, often wearing his Santa hat and signature red hoodie. He joined the Conservative Hype House collective in February 2020 and by October had more than 620,000 followers. He was interviewed for BBC Click in July 2020, where he discussed political advertising on TikTok.

In October 2020 Topher campaigned for Donald Trump on the Team Trump tour bus in Las Vegas. He also discussed the concerns of Black voters in the 2020 election on Fox and Friends.

== Music career ==
Topher has been performing hip-hop for 20 years. In December 2020, he released the single "The Patriot" (featuring The Marine Rapper) which reached #1 in the Billboard Rap Digital Song Sales chart.

In March 2021, Topher released his debut album No Apologies.

Topher and The Marine Rapper performed their song "The Patriot" at a Veterans for Trump rally held near the U.S. Capitol building at the time of its 2021 storming by supporters of President Donald Trump. Following the performance, Spotify removed the song from its platform, and Instagram banned Topher from broadcasting live.

Topher's song "I Left My Home" was featured in the 2021 movie A Journal for Jordan directed by Denzel Washington.

In late 2025, Topher began releasing AI-generated Gospel music under the stage name Solomon Ray. His first single with that formula, "Find Your Rest", became his breakthrough hit, and peaked at No. 3 on Billboard's Hot Gospel Songs chart while leading the Gospel Digital Song Sales chart. The single preceded the extended play, Faithful Soul, which would be released on November 7, 2025. The EP peaked at No. 10 on the Top Gospel Albums chart.

== Personal life ==
Topher lives in Philadelphia, Mississippi with his wife, Alicia, and two daughters.

== Discography ==
=== As Topher ===
- No Apologies (2021)
- 222 (2022)

=== As Solomon Ray ===
==== Extended plays ====
List of EPs, with selected chart positions
Title	Details	Peak chart positions	
Title	Details	US Gospel	US Blues
Faithful Soul	Released: November 7, 2025; Label: Independent; Format: Digital download, streaming	10	7
A Soulful Christmas	Released: November 14, 2025; Label: Independent; Format: Digital download, streaming	—	—
Faithful Soul, Pt. II	Released: January 16, 2026; Label: Independent; Format: Digital download, streaming	22	—
"—" denotes a recording that did not chart or was not released in that territory.

==== Singles ====
List of singles, with selected chart positions
Title	Year	Peak chart positions			Album
Title	Year	US	US Gospel	US Gospel Digital	Album
"Find Your Rest"	2025	— (Note: "Find Your Rest" did not enter the Billboard Hot 100, but peaked at No. 11 on the Digital Song Sales.)	3	1	Faithful Soul
"Do It With Soul"	2025	—	—	7	Faithful Soul
"I Got a Song"	2025	—	—	9	Faithful Soul, Pt. II
"Come to Me"	2025	— (Note: "Come to Me" did not enter the Billboard Hot 100, but peaked at No. 19 on the Digital Song Sales.)	12	1	Faithful Soul, Pt. II
"Seated"	2026	—	—	—	Non-album single
"—" denotes a recording that did not chart or was not released in that territory.

==== Other charted songs ====
List of charted songs, with selected chart positions
Title	Year	Peak chart positions		Album
Title	Year	US Gospel	US Gospel Digital	Album
"Goodbye Temptation"	2025	11	1	Faithful Soul
"Jesus and My Coffee"	2025	14	1	Faithful Soul
"I Got Faith"	2025	22	5	Faithful Soul
