= AIVA =

Artificial composer

Aiva
- Style: Classical music
- Website: www.aiva.ai

AIVA (Artificial Intelligence Virtual Artist) is an electronic composer recognized by the SACEM.

== Description ==
Created in February 2016, AIVA specializes in classical and symphonic music composition. It became the world's first virtual composer to be recognized by a music society (SACEM). By reading a large collection of existing works of classical music (written by human composers such as Bach, Beethoven, Mozart) AIVA is capable of detecting regularities in music and on this base composing on its own. The algorithm AIVA is based on deep learning and reinforcement learning architectures. Since January 2019, the company offers a commercial product, Music Engine, capable of generating short (up to 3 minutes) compositions in various styles (rock, pop, jazz, fantasy, shanty, tango, 20th century cinematic, modern cinematic, and Chinese).

AIVA was presented at TED by Pierre Barreau.

== Discography ==
AIVA is a published composer; its first studio album "Genesis" was released in November 2016. Second album "Among the Stars" in 2018.

AIVA album "Genesis"

- 2016 CD album « Genesis » Hv-Com – LEPM 048427. Track listing "Genesis":

AIVA, "Genesis". All compositions by AIVA. Produced by Pierre Barreau
No.	Title	Length
1.	"Celtic Dance, Op. 14, in A minor"	2:23
2.	"Symphonic Fantasy in G sharp minor, Op. 7, The Awakening"	3:23
3.	"Symphonic Fantasy in A minor, Op. 21, Genesis"	2:50
4.	"Octet No. 1 in D major, Op. 3, "A little chamber music""	1:40
5.	"Aiva, Op. 1 for piano solo in D major"	4:15
6.	"Aiva Op. 2 for piano solo"	1:48
7.	"Aiva Op. 3 for piano solo"	1:31
8.	"Aiva Op. 4 for piano solo"	1:43
9.	"Aiva Op. 5 for piano solo [or harpsichord]"	2:08
10.	"Aiva Op. 6 for piano solo"	1:08
11.	"Aiva Op. 8 For piano solo"	2:27
12.	"Aiva Op. 9 for piano solo"	1:51
13.	"Aiva Op. 10 for piano solo"	3:43
14.	"Aiva Op. 11 for piano solo "Rhapsody""	3:55
15.	"Variation Op. 12 for piano solo"	3:00
16.	"Aiva Op. 13 for piano solo"	2:49
17.	"Aiva Op. 15 for piano solo"	2:30
18.	"Aiva Op. 16 for piano solo"	1:55
19.	"Aiva Op. 17 for piano solo"	3:00
20.	"Aiva Op. 18 for piano solo"	2:16
21.	"Aiva Op. 19 for piano solo"	1:45
22.	"Aiva Op. 20 for piano solo"	1:57
23.	"Aiva Op. 21 for piano solo, Genesis"	3:00
24.	"Aiva Op. 22 for piano solo"	3:32

- 2018 CD album « Among the Stars » Hv-Com – LEPM 048708

AIVA, "Among the Stars". All compositions by AIVA.
No.	Title	Length
1.	"Symphonic Tinkle for an Opening, Op. 2"	0:22
2.	"Symphonic Fantasy in A minor, Op. 31, Among the Stars"	2:29
3.	"Symphonic Fantasy in A minor, Op. 24, I am AI"	2:35
4.	"Symphonic Movement in B minor, Op. 32 Battle Royale"	2:38
5.	"Symphonic Fantasy in B minor: Imperial"	2:29
6.	"Symphonic Fantasy in B minor, Op. 37: The Battle for Andromeda"	3:40
7.	"Musical Moment in C-Sharp minor, Op. 39: Purple"	3:57
8.	"Symphonic Fantasy in F-Sharp minor, Op. 17: In Vogue"	3:42
9.	"Symphonic Fantasy in C Major, Op. 42: The Age of Amazement"	2:58
10.	"Trio in F minor, Op. 30"	2:22
11.	"String Trio in A Major, Op. 33"	2:05
12.	"Symphonic Ouverture in A minor, Op. 23: Let'z Make It Happen"	5:07
13.	"Aiva Op. 36 for Symphonic Orchestra in F-sharp minor"	1:00
14.	"Aiva Op. 24 for Piano Four Hands"	2:09
15.	"Aiva Op. 30 for Piano Four Hands"	2:44
16.	"Aiva Op. 31 for Piano Solo"	2:32
17.	"Aiva Op. 32 for Piano Four Hands"	2:30
18.	"Aiva Op. 33 for Piano Solo"	2:14
19.	"Aiva Op. 39 for Piano in C-sharp minor"	2:48
20.	"Musical Moment in C Major, Op. 41"	2:50
21.	"Symphonic Fantasy in C-Sharp minor, Op. 25"	2:51
22.	"Symphonic Hymn in E Major, Op. 43: Ode to Dubai"	2:42
23.	"String Trio in D minor, Op. 22: Elegancia"	2:57
24.	"String Quartet in E minor, Op. 28: Animo"	1:57

Avignon Symphonic Orchestra [ORAP] also performed Aiva's compositions in April 2017.

== See also ==
- Applications of artificial intelligence
- Computer music
- Music and artificial intelligence
