= Xania Monet =

Artificially generated R&B singer

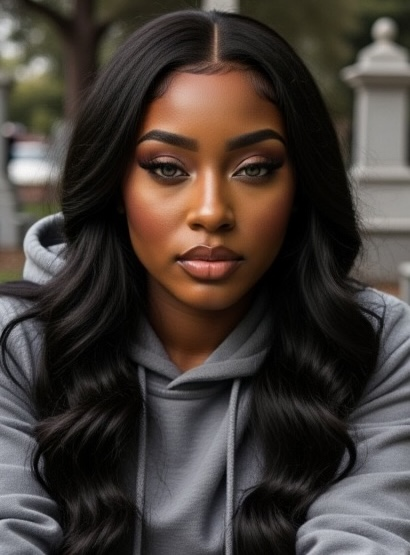
- A 2025 AI image of Monet

Background information
- Years active: 2025–present
- Label: Hallwood

Xania Monet is an artificial intelligence music project generated by Telisha "Nikki" Jones, starting in 2025. The song "How Was I Supposed to Know?" was the first AI song to enter a Billboard radio airplay chart, entering Adult R&B Airplay at number 30; it also charted on Hot R&B Songs, at 20. The song "Let Go, Let God" peaked at number 3 on Billboard's Hot Gospel Songs.

Jones, from Mississippi, writes the lyrics for Monet herself, and uses Suno to generate the music. A music video for "How Was I Supposed to Know?" uses live-action footage. Following a bidding war, Monet was signed to Hallwood Media for $3 million. Singer-songwriter Kehlani criticized the deal, saying that they felt Jones was "doing none of the work".

== Discography ==
=== Studio albums ===
Title	Details
Unfolded	Released: August 8, 2025; Label: Hallwood Media, TMJ Inc.; Formats: Digital download, streaming
Pieces Left Behind	Released: September 3, 2025; Label: Hallwood, TMJ; Formats: Digital download, streaming
The Things I Didn't Say	Released: January 9, 2026; Label: Hallwood, TMJ; Formats: Digital download, streaming

=== Singles ===
Title	Year	Album
"Forgot Me, Tryna Love You"	2025	Non-album singles
"I Found Me"	2025	Non-album singles
"It Wasn't Love, It Was Survival"	2025	Non-album singles
"At My Door"	2025	Non-album singles
"She Ain't Supposed to Matter"	2025	Non-album singles
"Still Not Choosing Me"	2025	Non-album singles
"They Don't Come Back"	2025	Non-album singles
"If the Last Time is My Last Time"	2025	Non-album singles
"Still Not Choosing Me"	2025	Non-album singles
"They Don't Come Back"	2025	Non-album singles
"If the Last Time is My Last Time"	2025	Non-album singles
"Still Her Baby"	2025	Non-album singles
"Too Late Too Stay"	2025	Non-album singles
"We See You Mama"	2025	Non-album singles
"The Strong Don't Get a Break"	2025	Non-album singles
"Daddy"	2025	Non-album singles
"Say My Name With Respect"	2026	The Things I Didn't Say

=== Other charted songs ===
Title	Year	Peak chart positions							Album
Title	Year	US	US R&B	US R&B Air	US R&B Digital	US Gospel	US Gospel Digital	US Gospel Stream.	Album
"How Was I Supposed to Know?"	2025	— (Note: "How Was I Supposed to Know?" did not enter the Billboard Hot 100 chart, but peaked at No. 22 on the Digital Song Sales chart.)	20	30	1	—	—	—	Unfolded
"Let Go, Let God"	2025	—	—	—	—	3	3	10	Unfolded
"If Only You Knew"	2025	—	—	—	—	14	6	—	Pieces Left Behind
"—" denotes a recording that did not chart or was not released in that territory.

== See also ==
- Breaking Rust, an AI-generated representation of a country singer
- Tilly Norwood, AI-generated character
