= Eline van der Velden =

Dutch actress, comedian and AI character creator (born 1985 or 1986)

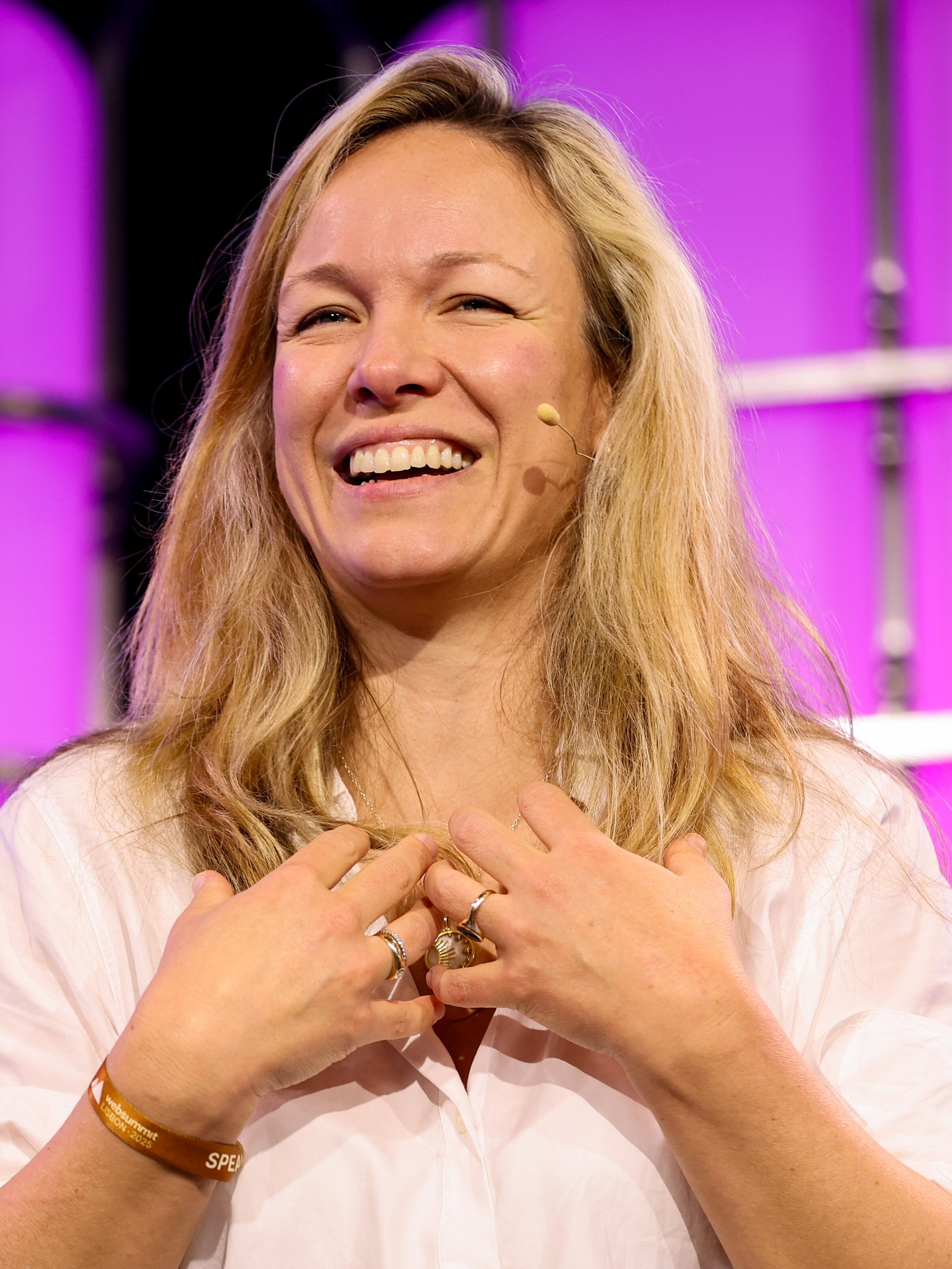
- Van der Velden in 2025
- Born: 1985 or 1986 (age 40–41); Curaçao, Netherlands Antilles
- Occupations: Producer; actress; comedian; writer
- Years active: 2009–present

Eline van der Velden (born 1985 or 1986) is a Dutch actress, comedian, writer, and producer based in London, England. She is best known for her work creating Tilly Norwood, an AI-generated "actress".

== Early life ==
Van der Velden was born on the Dutch island of Curaçao, Netherlands Antilles to Dutch businessman Steven van der Velden and physiotherapist Quirine van der Velden. She moved to the United Kingdom at age 14 to study drama and musical theatre at Tring Park School for the Performing Arts. She graduated with an MSc in physics from Imperial College London in 2008.

== Career ==
She was nominated by the International Academy of Digital Arts and Sciences for the Lovie Awards and won Best Online Comedy in 2013 for two of her submitted entries.

She has created multiple online shows such as Sketch My Life with London Hughes and Emily Hartridge and Match.com Parody. She became managing director of Makers Channel (makerschannel.co.uk), the first curated video platform in Europe in 2015. Makers Channel has been recently acquired by a Belgian media company De Persgroep, due to its success in the Netherlands.

In 2016, she appeared in adverts for the Dutch shampoo brand Andrelon.

Miss Holland, a comedy character created by Van der Velden, made headlines in 2016 as she asked the British public to teach her the national anthem.

As an actress, she has starred in Dutch TV series De Troon, Beatrix and the Golden Calf-winning series Overspel. In Belgium, she appeared opposite Jamie Dornan in Flying Home.

Van der Velden starred in the BBC Three series Putting It Out There, in which she challenges social perceptions of body hair, heels, spit, personal space, and authority figures.

In 2018, she starred in the BBC One comedy series Soft Border Patrol and the BBC Three comedy series Miss Holland.

In 2025, Particle6 Group, which Van der Velden founded in 2016, introduced Tilly Norwood, an AI-generated "actress" at the Zurich Film Festival. The announcement was met with outrage and a condemnation by the American actors' union SAG-AFTRA.

== Awards and recognition ==
Miss Holland won the Best Online Comedy at the 2013 Lovie Awards, judged by Stephen Fry. The Match.com Parody video won Best Online Comedy People's Lovie Award, the people's vote. Miss Holland and Match.com Parody Date 1 were also featured in the 2013 Google Lovie Letters.
