= Dorien Herremans =

Belgian AI music researcher (born 1982)

- Born: July 26, 1982 (age 43); Belgium
- Occupations: Associate Professor, Singapore University of Technology and Design
- Website: Dorien Herremans

Dorien Herremans (born July 26, 1982) is a Belgian AI music researcher. Herremans is a tenured associate professor in the Singapore University of Technology and Design.

== Career and Education ==
Dorien Herremans previously held a joint appointment at the Institute of High Performance Computing, A*STAR. She also works as a certified instructor for the NVIDIA Deep Learning Institute and was director of SUTD Game Lab. Before going to SUTD, she was a recipient of the Marie Sklodowska-Curie Postdoctoral Fellowship at the Centre for Digital Music (C4DM) at Queen Mary University of London, where she worked on the project MorpheuS: Hybrid Machine Learning – Optimization techniques To Generate Structured Music Through Morphing And Fusion. She received her Ph.D. in Applied Economics on the topic of Computer Generation and Classification of Music through Operations Research Methods. She graduated as a commercial engineer in management information systems at the University of Antwerp in 2005. After that, she worked as a Drupal consultant and was an IT lecturer at the Les Roches University in Bluche, Switzerland. She also worked as a 'mandaatassistent' at the University of Antwerp, in the domain of operations management, supply chain management and operations research.

== Research ==
Herremans' work focuses on generative music AI, data mining for music classification (hit prediction) and other novel applications in the intersections of AI, machine learning/optimization and music. She is a senior member of the IEEE. In 2021 she was nominated to the Singapore 100 Women in Technology list, and her Mustango: Controllable text-to-music Project won the SAIL Award Top 30 at the World Artificial Intelligence Conference in Shanghai in 2024.

Herremans' research on dance hit prediction, automatic piano fingering and AI automatic music generation systems (e.g. MorpheuS) has received attention in the popular press, including international magazines such as Motherboard from Vice magazine, Channel News Asia's Documentary Algorithms Episode 1: "Rage Against The Machine", The San Francisco Examiner, Belgian national TV and Belgian and French national radio.

== Selected publications ==
- Melechovsky, Jan; Guo, Zixun; Ghosal, Deepanway; Majumder, Navonil; Herremans, Dorien; Poria, Soujanya (2023-11-14). Mustango: Toward Controllable Text-to-Music Generation. Proc. of the Annual Conference of the North American Chapter of the Association for Computational Linguistics (NAACL). Mexico City. arXiv:2311.08355.
- Melechovsky, Jan; Roy, Abhinaba; Herremans, Dorien (2024-06-04). MidiCaps: A large-scale MIDI dataset with text captions. Proceedings of the International Society of Music Information Retrieval (ISMIR). San Francisco. arXiv:2406.02255.
- Herremans D, Chuan CH, Chew E (2017). "A Functional Taxonomy of Music Generation Systems". ACM Computing Surveys. 50 (5): 1–30. arXiv:1812.04186. doi:10.1145/3108242.
- Herremans D, Chew E (2017). "MorpheuS: generating structured music with constrained patterns and tension". IEEE Transactions on Affective Computing. 10 (4): 510–523. arXiv:1812.04832. doi:10.1109/TAFFC.2017.2737984.
- Chuan CH, Herremans D (April 2018). "Modeling Temporal Tonal Relations in Polyphonic Music Through Deep Networks with a Novel Image-Based Representation". Proceedings of the AAAI Conference on Artificial Intelligence. 32. doi:10.1609/aaai.v32i1.11880.
- Sturm BL, Ben-Tal O, Monaghan Ú, Collins N, Herremans D, Chew E, Hadjeres G, Deruty E, Pachet F (2019). "Machine learning research that matters for music creation: A case study". Journal of New Music Research. 48 (1): 36–55. doi:10.1080/09298215.2018.1515233.
- Chuan CH, Agres K, Herremans D (2020). "From context to concept: exploring semantic relationships in music with word2vec". Neural Computing and Applications. 32 (4): 1023–1036. arXiv:1811.12408. doi:10.1007/s00521-018-3923-1.
- Lin KW, Balamurali BT, Koh E, Lui S, Herremans D (2020). "Singing voice separation using a deep convolutional neural network trained by ideal binary mask and cross entropy". Neural Computing and Applications. 32 (4): 1037–1050. arXiv:1812.01278. doi:10.1007/s00521-018-3933-z.
- Herremans D, Sörensen K (2013). "Composing fifth species counterpoint music with a variable neighborhood search algorithm". Expert Systems with Applications. 40 (16): 6427–6437. doi:10.1016/j.eswa.2013.05.071.
- Herremans D, Martens D, Sörensen K (2014). "Dance Hit Song Prediction". Journal of New Music Research. 43 (3): 291–302. arXiv:1905.08076. doi:10.1080/09298215.2014.881888.
