= Final Fantasy: The Spirits Within =

2001 American-Japanese animated science fiction film

- Theatrical release poster

Japanese name
- Kanji: ファイナルファンタジー
Transcriptions
- Revised Hepburn: Fainarufantajī
- Directed by: Hironobu Sakaguchi
- Written by: Al Reinert; Jeff Vintar
- Story by: Hironobu Sakaguchi
- Based on: Final Fantasy by Hironobu Sakaguchi
- Produced by: Hironobu Sakaguchi; Jun Aida; Chris Lee
- Starring: Ming-Na Wen; Alec Baldwin; James Woods; Donald Sutherland; Ving Rhames; Steve Buscemi; Peri Gilpin
- Cinematography: Motonori Sakakibara
- Edited by: Chris S. Capp
- Music by: Elliot Goldenthal
- Production companies: Columbia Pictures; Square Pictures
- Distributed by: Sony Pictures Releasing (United States); Gaga Communications (Japan)
- Release dates: July 2, 2001 (Mann Bruins Theatre); July 11, 2001 (United States)
- Running time: 106 minutes
- Countries: Japan; United States
- Language: English
- Budget: $137 million
- Box office: $85.1 million

Final Fantasy: The Spirits Within (Japanese: ファイナルファンタジー, Hepburn: Fainarufantajī) is a 2001 animated science fiction film directed by Hironobu Sakaguchi, creator of the Final Fantasy franchise. A co-production between Japan and the United States, it was the first photorealistic computer-animated feature film and the most expensive video game-inspired film until the release of Prince of Persia: The Sands of Time in 2010. The film stars the voices of Ming-Na Wen, Alec Baldwin, Donald Sutherland, James Woods, Ving Rhames, Peri Gilpin, and Steve Buscemi, and follows scientists Aki Ross and Doctor Sid in their efforts to free a post-apocalyptic Earth from the Phantoms, a mysterious, deadly alien race who has driven the remnants of humanity into "barrier cities". Aki and Sid must fight against General Hein, who wants to use more violent means to end the conflict.

Square Pictures rendered the film using some of the most advanced processing capabilities available at the time. A render farm of 960 workstations was tasked with rendering each of the film's 141,964 frames. It took a staff of 200 about four years to complete The Spirits Within. Square intended to make the character of Aki Ross into the world's first photorealistic computer-animated actress, with plans for appearances in multiple films in different roles.

The Spirits Within premiered in Los Angeles on July 2, 2001, and was theatrically released in the United States on July 11. It received mixed reviews, but was widely praised for its characters' realism. Due to rising costs, the film greatly exceeded its original budget toward the end of production, reaching a final cost of $137 million (equivalent to $226 million in 2025); it grossed only $85.1 million at the box office. The film has been called a box-office bomb and is blamed for the demise of Square Pictures.

== Plot ==
In 2065, Earth is infested by alien life forms known as Phantoms. By physical contact Phantoms consume the Gaia spirit of living beings, killing them instantly, although minor contact may only result in an infection. The surviving humans live in "barrier cities" protected by energy shields that prevent Phantoms from entering, and are engaged in an ongoing struggle to free the planet. After being infected by a Phantom during one of her experiments, scientist Dr. Aki Ross (Ming-Na Wen) and her mentor, Dr. Sid (Donald Sutherland), discover a means of defeating the Phantoms by gathering eight spirits: unique energy patterns contained by various lifeforms. When joined, the resulting energy wave can negate the Phantoms. Aki searches for the sixth spirit in the ruins of New York City when she is cornered by Phantoms but rescued by Captain Gray Edwards (Alec Baldwin) and his squad Deep Eyes, consisting of Master Sergeant Ryan Whittaker (Ving Rhames), Neil Fleming (Steve Buscemi) and Corporal Jane Proudfoot (Peri Gilpin). It is revealed that Gray was once romantically involved with Aki.

Returning to her barrier city, Aki joins Sid and appears before the leadership council along with General Douglas Hein (James Woods). Hein is determined to use the Zeus cannon, a powerful weapon aboard a space station, to destroy the Phantoms, though Sid is concerned the cannon will damage Earth's Gaia (a spirit representing its ecosystem). Aki delays the use of the cannon by revealing that she has been infected and the collected spirits are keeping her infection stable, convincing the council that there may be another way to defeat the Phantoms. However, this revelation leads Hein to incorrectly conclude that she is being controlled by the Phantoms. Aki and the Deep Eyes squad succeed in finding the seventh spirit as Aki's infection begins to worsen and she slips into unconsciousness. Her dream reveals to her that the Phantoms are the spirits of dead aliens brought to Earth on a fragment of their destroyed planet. Sid uses the seventh spirit to bring Aki's infection back under control, reviving her.

To scare the council into giving him clearance to fire the Zeus cannon, Hein lowers part of the barrier shield protecting the city. Though Hein intended that only a few Phantoms enter, his plan goes awry and legions of Phantoms invade the entire city. Aki, Sid and the Deep Eyes attempt to reach Aki's spaceship, their means of escape, but Ryan, Neil and Jane are killed by Phantoms. Hein escapes and boards the Zeus cannon's space station, where he finally receives authorization to fire the cannon.

Sid finds the eighth spirit at the crater site of the alien asteroid's impact on Earth at the Caspian Mountains. He lowers a shielded vehicle, with Aki and Gray aboard, into the crater to locate the final spirit. Just before they can reach it, Hein fires the Zeus cannon into the crater, not only destroying the eighth spirit but also revealing the Phantom Gaia. Aki has a vision of the Phantom home planet, where she is able to receive the eighth spirit from the alien particles in herself. When Aki awakens, she and Gray combine it with the other seven. Hein continues to fire the Zeus cannon despite overheating warnings and unintentionally destroys the cannon and himself. Gray sacrifices himself as a medium needed to physically transmit the completed spirit into the alien Gaia. The Earth's Gaia is returned to normal as the Phantoms ascend into space, finally at peace. Aki is pulled from the crater holding Gray's body and is seen looking into the newly liberated world.

== Production ==
=== Development ===
Snow White was the first all-color, full-length cartoon, and everyone thought [Disney] was crazy. He could have gone out and hired a real actress and got some little people to play the dwarfs; but he felt very strongly that there was a better way to tell that particular story.

— Chris Lee, producer

Final Fantasy: The Spirits Within was filmed entirely in English. The original script, written by Sakaguchi, was titled Gaia. The screenplay was later rewritten by Al Reinert and Jeff Vintar. The film was co-directed by Motonori Sakakibara, with Jun Aida and Chris Lee both serving as producers. Lee even compared The Spirits Within, the first full-length photorealistic animated film, to Walt Disney's Snow White and the Seven Dwarfs, the first full-length cel animated film. In order to keep the film in line with Hironobu Sakaguchi's vision as director, several script rewrites took place, most in the initial stages of production. By April 2000, Square was partnering with Columbia Pictures to produce the film, making it the first animated feature Columbia had worked on since Care Bears Movie II: A New Generation in 1986. Columbia was given the rights to distribute the film worldwide, with the exception of Asia.

The Spirits Within was completed over a period of four-years, during which approximately 200 people put in a combined 120 years of work on it. The first 18 months of development were spent creating the in-house software SQFlesh, which plugged into the programs Autodesk Maya and RenderMan. The majority of the rest of production was spent on animation. Square accumulated four SGI Origin 2000 series servers, four Onyx2 systems, and 167 Octane workstations for the film's production. The basic film was rendered at a custom render farm created by Square in Hawaii. It housed 960 Pentium III-933 MHz workstations. Character movements were filmed using motion capture technology. Animator Matthew Hackett stated that while motion capture was effective for many of the scenes, in others animators still had to add movements manually. Hand and facial movements were all done manually. Some of General Hein's facial features and poses were based on Hackett. As animators did not want to use any actual photographs in the film, all backgrounds were done using matte paintings. 1,327 scenes in total needed to be filmed to animate the digital characters. The film consists of 141,964 frames, with each frame taking an average of 90 minutes to render. By the end of production Square had a total of 15 terabytes of artwork for the film.

At first it was very lonely sitting in that booth and eerie to see (Aki's) lips move and my words coming out, but slowly I began to enjoy my time with Aki, and I became attuned to her.

— Ming-Na, voice actor

Aki Ross's voice actor, Ming-Na Wen, was selected for a perceived fit between her personality and Aki's. Ming-Na, who found the role via her publicist, said she felt like she had given birth with her voice to the character. She gradually accustomed herself to the difficulty of working without the presence and spontaneity of real actors, and commented that the voice-acting work did not take much time, as she would just go into the studio "once or twice a month for about four months" with no need for make-up and costuming sessions. The workload was so light it did not interfere with her acting commitments in the television series ER.

Sakaguchi said that he was pleased with the film's final cut, and he would not have changed anything if given the chance. The film had high cost overruns towards the end of filming. New funds had to be sourced to cover the increasing production costs while maintaining staff salaries. The film's final cost of $137 million, which included about $30 million spent on marketing by Columbia Pictures, escalated from an original budget rumored to be around $70 million. $45 million alone was spent on the construction of Square's studio in Hawaii.

=== Themes ===
Director Sakaguchi named the main character after his mother, Aki, who died in an accident several years prior to the production of the film. Her death led Sakaguchi to reflect on what happened to the spirit after death, and these thoughts resurfaced while he was planning the film, eventually taking the form of the Gaia hypothesis. He later explained that the theme he wanted to convey was "more of a complex idea of life and death and spirit", believing that the best way to portray this would be to set the film on Earth. By comparison, Final Fantasy video games are set in fictional worlds. Dan Mayers from Sight & Sound said that the film followed the same theme typically found in Final Fantasy video games: "A party of heroes averts impending global holocaust by drawing on their individual skills, gaining knowledge through challenges and emerging victorious with new-found love and respect for themselves and their companions". Writing in the book Robot Ghosts and Wired Dreams, Livia Monnet wrote the film remediated "the notion of life in the neovitalistic, evolutionary biology of Lynn Margulis and in contemporary theories on artificial life", going on to state that the film's exploration of the Gaia hypothesis raised interesting questions regarding the life and death process of both cinema and digital media, as well as contemporary life sciences, cybernetics, philosophy and science fiction. The concept of artificial life and resurrection was also discussed, and compared to similar themes in the 1914 book Locus Solus; the Phantoms in The Spirits Within were considered to be brought to life by various forces: by the alien planet's red Gaia and then by human spiritual energy.

=== Character design ===
Aki Ross was designed to be as realistic as possible; Square Pictures intended for the CGI character to be the world's first artificial actress to appear in multiple films in multiple roles.

Each character's base body model was built from more than 100,000 polygons, plus more than 300,000 for clothing alone. Aki's character model bears 60,000 hairs, each of which were separately and fully animated and rendered. In creating the characters, designers had to transition between using PowerAnimator, Autodesk Maya and RenderMan.

Aki's appearance was conceived by the lead animator of the project, Roy Sato, who created several conceptual designs for Sakaguchi to consider, and then used the selected design as a guide for her character model. Sato perceived Aki's original look as a "supermodel", and subsequently removed her make-up and shortened her hair in order to give her a more intelligent look that would "convince people that she's a scientist". In an interview, Sato described actively trying to make her appear as realistic as possible, making her similar to himself in as many ways as he could in the animation, including elements of his personality through facial expressions. He concluded that Aki ended up being similar to him in almost every way, with the exception that "she's a lot cuter". The model for Aki was designed to closely follow human appearance, with Sakaguchi commenting in an interview: "I think it's OK to look at Aki and be convinced that she's a human".

While Square ruled out any chance of a sequel to The Spirits Within before it was even completed, Sakaguchi intended to position Aki as being the "main star" for Square Pictures, using her in later games and films by Square, and including the flexibility of being able to modify aspects such as her age for such appearances. Ming-Na said that she would be willing if asked to continue voicing Aki. Aki only made one appearance outside of the film; in 2002, she appeared in a demonstration video that Square Pictures made to present to the Wachowskis before developing Final Flight of the Osiris for The Animatrix. The short film, appearing in the DVD's bonus content and featuring her with a slightly modified design, shows her acrobatically dueling a robot from the Matrix setting. Shortly afterwards, Square Pictures was closed and absorbed into Square, which ceased using the character.

== Music ==
Final Fantasy – Original Motion Picture Soundtrack

Soundtrack album of Final Fantasy: The Spirits Within by Elliot Goldenthal
- Released: July 3, 2001
- Studios: Watford Colosseum, Watford; AIR, Lyndhurst
- Genre: Film music
- Length: 56:35
- Language: English
- Label: Sony Classical
- Producer: Teese Gohl

Elliot Goldenthal chronology
Titus (2000)	Final Fantasy – Original Motion Picture Soundtrack (2001)	Frida (2002)

The soundtrack to the film was released on July 3, 2001, by Sony Music. Elliot Goldenthal composed the entire score, as well as the film's theme song, "The Dream Within", which had lyrics written by Richard Rudolf and vocals performed by Lara Fabian. Director Hironobu Sakaguchi opted for the acclaimed Goldenthal instead of Nobuo Uematsu, the composer of the Final Fantasy games' soundtracks, a decision met with mixed opinions as the former was completely unknown to many of the games' fans. The last song on the album and the second and final song to play during the film's credits (after "The Dream Within") is "Spirit Dreams Inside" by Japanese rock band L'Arc-en-Ciel.

The film's score was performed by the London Symphony Orchestra with Belgian composer Dirk Brossé conducting. It was recorded in the United Kingdom at the Watford Coloseum and the London AIR Lyndhurst Hall and was mixed at the Manhattan Center Studios in the United States. In the liner notes to the album, Goldenthal describes the soundtrack as combining orchestration techniques associated with the late 20th-century Polish avant-garde, as well as his experiments from Alien 3, and 19th-century Straussian brass and string instrumentation. In the film's 'Making of' featurette, Goldenthal states he used "ghostly choral" music when the Phantoms are emerging, in an attempt to give a celestial feeling, and focused on low brass clusters and taiko drum rhythms for violent scenes. When Aki talks about a dying girl, Goldenthal used a piano in order to give a domestic home-like feeling to a completely foreign environment, also choosing to use a flute each time Aki focusses on Gaia, as he believed it to be the most "human kind of instrument".

The album was met with positive reviews. Neil Shurley from AllMusic, who gave the album 4 out of 5, opined the album would probably have been nominated for an Oscar if the film itself had been more popular, as did the reviewer from Soundtrack Express, who gave the soundtrack 5 out of 5. Christopher Coleman from Tracksounds gave the soundtrack 10 out of 10, saying the feel of the album was "expansive and majestic" and that the score elevated the viewing experience of the film. A review from Filmtracks gave the album 4 out of 5, calling it "an easy album to recommend". Dan Goldwasser from Soundtrack.net also gave the soundtrack 4 out of 5, calling it a "must have".

"The Phantom Plains"
Sample of "The Phantom Plains" from the soundtrack album.

The album peaked at No. 19 on Billboard's Top Soundtracks list and No. 193 on the Billboard 200 on July 28, 2001. The track "The Dream Within" was nominated for "Best Original Song Written for a Film" at the 2002 World Soundtrack Awards, but lost to "If I Didn't Have You" which was composed for Monsters, Inc..

== Release ==
=== Box office ===
Before the film's release, there was already skepticism of its potential to be financially successful. Chris Taylor from Time magazine noted that video game adaptations had a poor track record at the box office and that it was Sakaguchi's first feature film. The film debuted on July 2, 2001, at the Mann Bruins Theater in Los Angeles, California, and was released in the United States on July 11, where it made $11.4 million during its opening weekend, ranking in fourth place behind Legally Blonde, The Score and Cats & Dogs. The film would end up making $32 million in North America and selling 5,961,378 tickets in the United States. The film grossed $85 million in worldwide box office receipts, including ¥1 billion in Japan. 1,456,523 tickets were sold in France, 4,299,604 tickets in other European countries and 446,728 tickets in Brazil. The film achieved average to poor results at the box office in most of Southeast Asia; however, it performed well in Australia, New Zealand and South Korea; 160,100 tickets were sold in Seoul City.

In 2006, Boston.com regarded it as the 4th biggest box office bomb, estimating the film's losses at the end of its cinema run at over $94 million. In March 2012, CNBC considered it to be the 9th biggest box office bomb.

=== Critical reception ===
If the ambitious mix of East–West, movie-game and anime-action doesn't pay off, we may still remember this as the moment true CG actors were born.

— Time magazine

Final Fantasy: The Spirits Within holds an approval rating of 44% on Rotten Tomatoes based on 144 reviews, with an average rating of 5.30/10. The website's critical consensus reads: "The movie raises the bar for computer-animated movies, but the story is dull and emotionally removed". Metacritic, which uses a weighted average, gives the film a score of 49 out of 100 based on 28 critics, indicating "mixed or average" reviews. Audiences surveyed by CinemaScore on opening night gave the film an average grade of "C+" on an A+ to F scale.

Roger Ebert of the Chicago Sun-Times was a strong advocate of the film; he gave it 3½ stars out of four, praising it as a "technical milestone". While having some minor criticism of the plot, he concluded the reason to see the film was "simply, gloriously, to look at it", especially praising the realism in Aki's face. He also expressed a desire for the film to succeed in hopes of seeing others made in its image, though he was skeptical of its ability to be accepted. Peter Bradshaw of The Guardian echoed concerns about the plot, describing it as "adequate" though also stating it quickly slipped into cliché. He also had high praise for the animation in general, though lamented that the character's faces did not look quite real enough.

Writing in a 2007 article about the uncanny valley, John Mangan from The Age cited character's eyes in the film as an example of this phenomenon, where attempts to create realistic humans unintentionally cause revulsion; Peter Travers from Rolling Stone said that it was enjoyable watching the characters at first, "but then you notice a coldness in the eyes, a mechanical quality in the movements". Nell Minow from Common Sense Media also expressed concerns about realism in the characters, describing the visuals as stunning overall but finding subtle issues with characters talking and acting. Describing the dialogue as "passable", Nell also said the script read like a reject from Pokémon, and that its "confusing gibberish about the earth's spirit [would] not do justice to the beliefs of environmentalists or pantheists". Todd McCarthy from Variety gave a positive review, praising the voice work and visuals though saying the characters were no more emotionally expressive than those in traditional animation. McCarthy described the acting as "no worse" than the majority of science-fiction films, also saying that as far as video game adaptation films went, The Spirits Within "sure beats Lara Croft: Tomb Raider".

=== Reception of Aki Ross ===
Aki's appearance was received positively by critics, with praise for the finer details of the character model such as the rendering of her hair. Entertainment Weekly named Aki an "it girl", stating that "calling this action heroine a cartoon would be like calling a Rembrandt a doodle". Ruth La Ferla from The New York Times described her as having the "sinewy efficiency" of Alien franchise character Ellen Ripley and visual appeal of Julia Roberts' portrayal of Erin Brockovich. The book Digital Shock: Confronting the New Reality by Herve Fischer described her as a virtual actress having a "beauty that is 'really' impressive", comparing her to video game character Lara Croft. In contrast, Livia Monnet criticized her character as an example of the constantly kidnapped female in Japanese cinema, further "diluted" by her existence solely as a computer-generated character representing "an ideal, cinematic female character that has no real referent".

Writing in the book Action and Adventure Cinema, Marc O'Day described her as among the "least overtly eroticised" female characters in science fiction, though stated that Aki was "transformed in a variety of poses into an erotic fantasy machine" in a bikini photo shoot that was included on the DVD's special features. She appeared dressed in a bikini on the cover of Maxim, and was ranked by the magazine and its readers as one of the sexiest women of 2001, placing at No. 87 out of 100 and becoming the first fictional woman to ever make the list. The same image of her appeared in the "Babes: The Girls of Sci Fi" special issue of SFX.

=== Legacy and related media ===
The merger between Square and Enix, which had been under consideration since at least 2000 according to Yasuhiro Fukushima, Enix chairman at the time, was delayed because of the failure of the film and Enix's hesitation at merging with a company that had just lost a substantial amount of money. Square Pictures was closed in late January 2002, largely due to the commercial failure of The Spirits Within.

The film's CGI effects have been compared favourably with those in later films, such as Avatar (2009). In 2011, BioWare art director Derek Watts cited The Spirits Within as a major influence on the successful Mass Effect series of action role-playing games. In the first episode of the Square Enix-published 2015 video game Life Is Strange, when the lead character interacts with a TV, she mentions the idea of watching the film, and says "I don't care what anybody says, that's one of the best sci-fi films ever made".

Although the film was loosely based on a video game series, there were never any plans for a game adaptation of the film itself. Sakaguchi indicated the reason for this was the lack of powerful gaming hardware at the time, feeling the graphics in any game adaptation would be far too much of a step down from the graphics in the film itself. A novelization was written by Dean Wesley Smith and published by Pocket Books in June 2001. The Making of Final Fantasy: The Spirits Within, a companion book, was published by BradyGames in August 2001. Edited by Steven L. Kent, the 240-page color book contains a foreword by director Sakaguchi and extensive information on all aspects of the film's creation, including concept art, storyboards, sets and props, layout, motion capture and animation, as well as a draft of the full script.

=== Accolades ===
The film won the "Jury Prize" at the 2002 Japan Media Arts Festival. It was nominated for "Best Sound Editing – Animated Feature Film, Domestic and Foreign" at the 49th Golden Reel Awards as well as "Best Animated Feature" at the 5th Online Film Critics Society awards. Conversely, the film was also nominated in the worst screenplay category at the 2001 Stinkers Bad Movie Awards, but lost to Pearl Harbor. The film's trailer was nominated for the "Golden Fleece" award at the 3rd Golden Trailer Awards.

Year	Event	Award	Nominee	Result
2002	Golden Reel Awards	Best Sound Editing – Animated Feature Film	Sound editing team	Nominated
2002	Golden Trailer Awards	Golden Fleece	Final Fantasy: The Spirits Within trailer (Giaronomo Productions, Inc.)	Nominated
2002	Japan Media Arts Festival	Jury Prize	Final Fantasy: The Spirits Within	Won
2002	Online Film Critics Society Awards	Best Animated Feature	Final Fantasy: The Spirits Within	Nominated
2002	Saturn Awards	Best DVD Special Edition Release	Final Fantasy: The Spirits Within DVD	Nominated
2002	World Soundtrack Awards	Best Original Song Written for a Film	"The Dream Within" (Elliot Goldenthal, Richard Rudolf, and Lara Fabian)	Nominated
2002	Stinker Award	Worst Screenplay for a Film Grossing More Than $100M Worldwide Using Hollywood Math	Final Fantasy: The Spirits Within	Nominated

=== Home media ===
A two-disc DVD version of the film was released on October 23, 2001. Two weeks before it was released the DVD version was listed on Amazon.com as one of the most-anticipated releases, and it was expected to recoup some of the money lost on the film's disappointing box office performance. The DVD was initially a top seller; in February 2002, Jun Aida said that while sales were still strong, they were not good enough to save Square Pictures from closing. Both versions contained two full-length commentary tracks (one featuring Motonori Sakakibara, sequence supervisor Hiroyuki Hayashida, lead artist Tatsuro Maruyama, and creature supervisor Takoo Noguchi; the second featuring animation director Andy Jones, editor Chris S. Capp, and staging director Tani Kunitake) as well as an isolated score with commentary. They also contained a version of the film in its basic CGI and sketch form, with the option of pop-up comments on the film. An easter egg shows the cast of the film re-enacting the dance from Michael Jackson's Thriller. Fifteen featurettes, including seven on character biographies, three on vehicle comparisons and an interactive "Making Of" featurette, were also included. Other features included Aki's dream viewable as a whole sequence, the film's original opening sequence, and intentional outtakes. Peter Bracke from High-Def Digest stated the DVD was "so packed with extras it was almost overwhelming", stating that Sony went "all-out" on the extra features in a likely attempt to boost DVD sales and recover losses. A single-disc edition of the film with significantly less special features was released on August 27, 2002. A Blu-ray Disc edition was released on August 7, 2007. The film received a Ultra HD Blu-ray release on November 16, 2021, presenting the film in 4K format with audio in Dolby Atmos/TrueHD 7.1 channel format.

As of December 2001, the film grossed $26.6 million in video rental revenue in the United States, equivalent to 83.4% of its box office gross in the country. The DVD was nominated for "Best DVD Special Edition Release" at the 28th Saturn Awards. Aaron Beierle from DVD Talk gave a positive review of the DVD, rating it 4½ out of 5 stars for audio quality, video quality and special features. Dustin Somner from Blu-ray.com gave the Blu-ray version 5 out of 5 stars for video quality and special features, and 4½ stars for audio quality. Peter Bracke gave the Blu-ray version 4 out of 5 stars overall.
