= Breaking Rust =

AI-generated country music artist

- An AI-generated visual representation

Background information
- Years active: 2025–present

"Walk My Walk" by Breaking Rust

Breaking Rust is an AI-generated country music project prompted by Aubierre Rivaldo Taylor. It gained prominence with the release of the Resilient EP in October 2025, featuring singles such as "Walk My Walk" and "Livin' on Borrowed Time". "Walk My Walk" topped the Billboard Country Digital Song Sales chart, the first AI-generated country song to do so, though the significance of this has been questioned. Breaking Rust has amassed almost 100k followers on Instagram as of 2026, where the character is presented with a cowboy persona.

== Description ==
Breaking Rust was developed using generative artificial intelligence tools to produce vocals, instrumentation, and lyrics, with no human performers involved. The project is credited to Aubierre Rivaldo Taylor, an obscure figure with limited online presence prior to the act's launch. Taylor previously created music under the alias Defbeatsai, focusing on explicit, AI-generated country tracks in the style of Wheeler Walker Jr. The act's persona is represented through AI-generated imagery, depicting a rugged cowboy in dystopian settings. No registrations for Breaking Rust or Taylor appear in performing rights organizations BMI and ASCAP. The act's debut release, the Resilient EP, was issued in October 2025 and includes eight tracks available on platforms Spotify and Apple Music.

Breaking Rust debuted at No. 9 on the Billboard Emerging Artists chart dated November 1, 2025, driven by "Walk My Walk" and "Livin' on Borrowed Time". "Walk My Walk" reached No. 1 on the Country Digital Song Sales chart with approximately 3,000 units sold. Due to the low volume of contemporary digital music sales in the age of music streaming, Andrew Chow, writing in TIME magazine, questioned the significance of the charting, noting that digital music sales charts have had problems with manipulation, and suggested that the No. 1 ranking of the song may have been artificially inflated for publicity purposes. The Independent noted that as the song was priced at about $1, it would only have taken around $3,000 to push the song to the No. 1 chart position.

Billboard stated that in recent months, at least six AI "artists" have made it into Billboard rankings. Aaron Ryan of Whiskey Riff noted the track's appeal, describing it as "groovy" and reminiscent of classic country, yet expressed concern over its synthetic origins. In a separate NPR interview, Ryan argued that AI erodes the genre's emphasis on authenticity, drawing parallels to the backlash against Randy Travis's AI-assisted vocal release in 2024. The issue has also been discussed on social media, with some fans being unaware of the AI aspect until they saw media coverage of it.

== See also ==
- Xania Monet, an AI-generated representation of a gospel and R&B singer
- Tilly Norwood, an AI-generated character
