= Aux-send =

Electronic signal-routing output

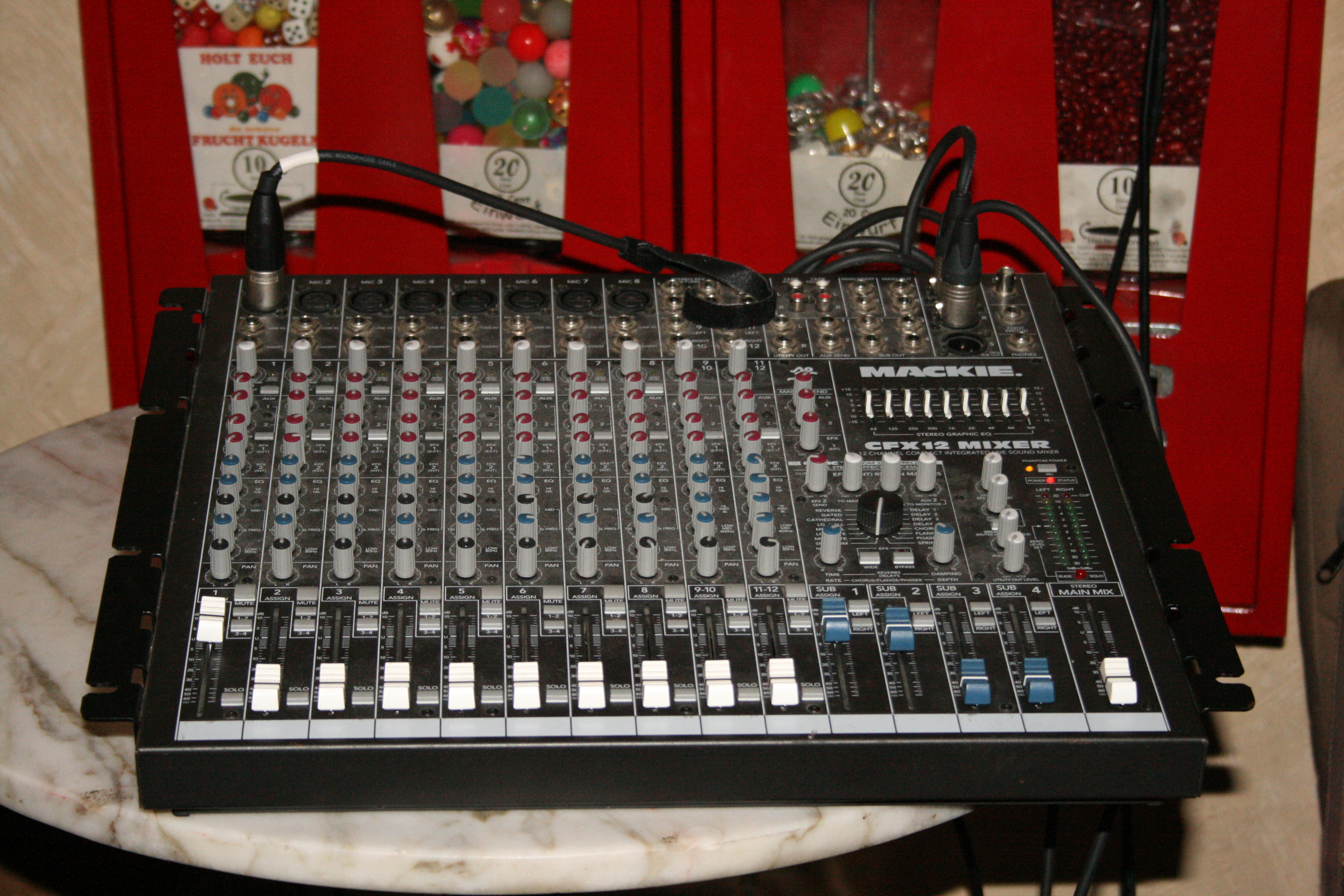
Mackie CFX12 Live Sound Mixer

An aux-send (auxiliary send) is an electronic signal-routing output used on multi-channel sound mixing consoles used in recording and broadcasting settings and on PA system amplifier-mixers used in music concerts. The signal from the auxiliary send is often routed through outboard audio processing effects units (e.g., reverb, digital delay, compression, etc.) and then returned to the mixer using an auxiliary return input jack, thus creating an effects loop. This allows effects to be added to an audio source or channel within the mixing console. Another common use of the aux send mix is to create monitor mixes for the onstage performers' monitor speakers or in-ear monitors. The aux send's monitor mix is usually different from the front-of-house mix the audience is hearing.

== Purpose ==
The routing configuration and usage of an aux-send will vary depending on the application. Two types of aux-sends commonly exist: pre-fader and post-fader. Pre-fader sends are not affected by the main fader for the channel, while post-fader sends are affected by the position of the main fader slider control for the channel.

In a common configuration, a post-fader aux-send output is connected to the audio input of an outboard (i.e., an external [usually rack-mounted] unit that is not part of the mixer console) audio effects unit (most commonly a temporal/time-based effect such as reverb or delay; compressors and other dynamic processors would normally be on an insert, instead). The audio output of the outboard unit is then connected to the aux-return input on the mixing console (if the recording console has one), or it can be looped back to one of the console's unused input channels. A post-fader output is used in order to prevent channels whose faders are at zero gain from "contaminating" the effects-return loop with hiss and hum.

Mixing consoles most commonly have a group of aux-send knobs in each channel strip, or, on small mixers, a single aux-send knob per channel, where one knob corresponds to each aux-send on the board. The controls enable the operator to adjust the amount of signal that will be sent from its corresponding channel into the signal bus routed to its corresponding aux-send output. The largest, most expensive mixers have a number of aux-send knobs on every channel, thus giving the audio engineer the flexibility to create many live sound and/or recording applications for the mixer.

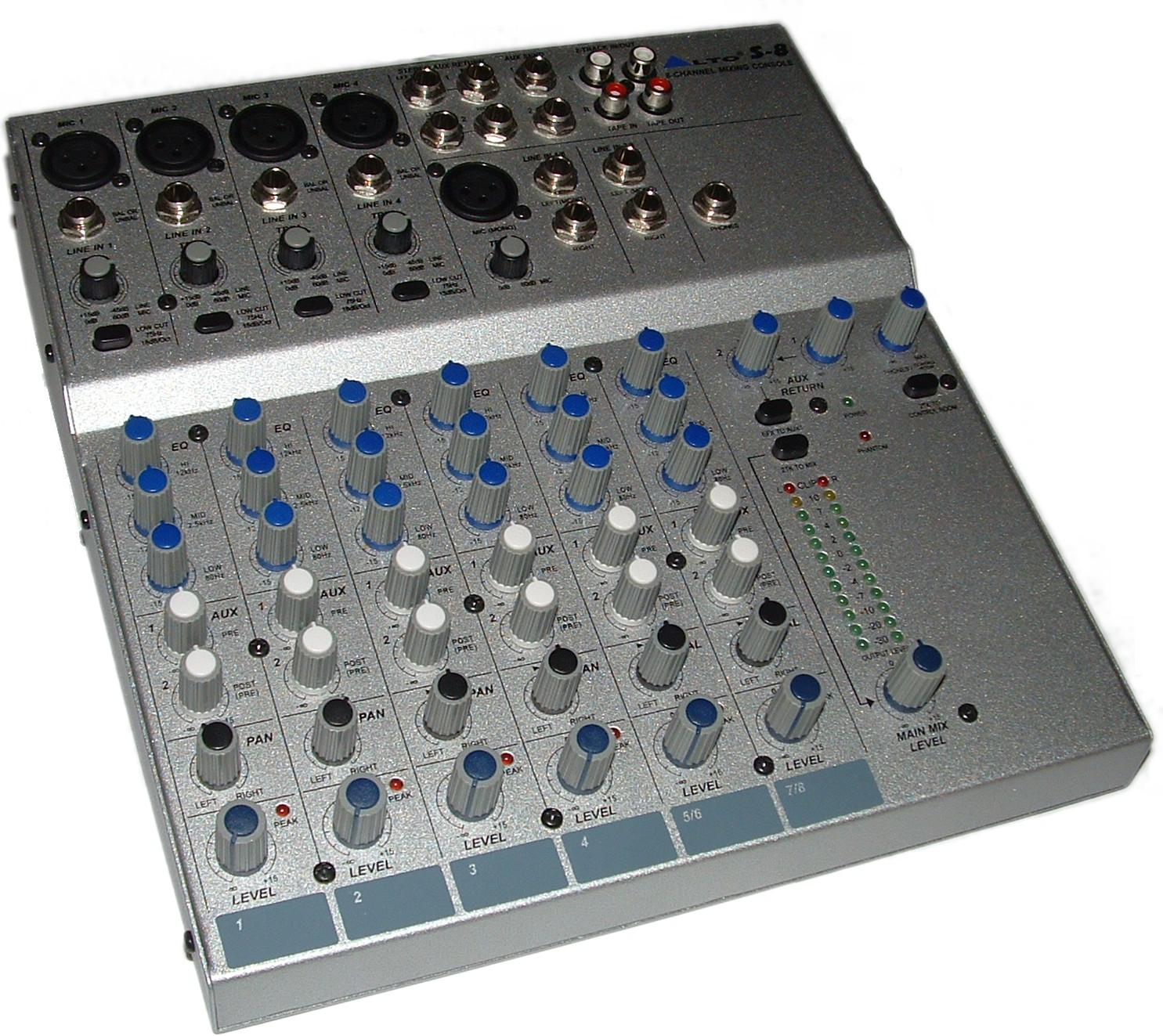
This Alto S-8 mixer has two knobs for controlling the aux-send mix (the third and fourth knobs from the bottom).

A benefit of using an aux-send is that it enables the signals from multiple channels on a mixing console to be simultaneously routed to a single outboard device. For instance, audio signals from all the channels of a sixteen-channel mixing console can be routed to a single outboard reverb unit so that all channels are heard with reverb.

The aux-sends from a group of inputs can also be routed to an amplifier and then sent to monitor speakers so that the onstage musicians can hear their singing or playing through monitor wedge speakers on the stage or through in-ear monitors. The benefit of using the pre-fader aux-send function is that the volume of the vocals or instruments in the monitor mix does not have to be the same as the "front-of-house" mix for the audience. Musicians whose voices are barely present in the "front-of-house" mix, such as backup vocalists, can have their sound clearly and loudly sent through a monitor speaker so that they can hear themselves singing and ensure that their pitch and timing are correct.

== See also ==
- Sound reinforcement system
- Sound recording
- Send track
