= Alexsucks =

American dance-punk band

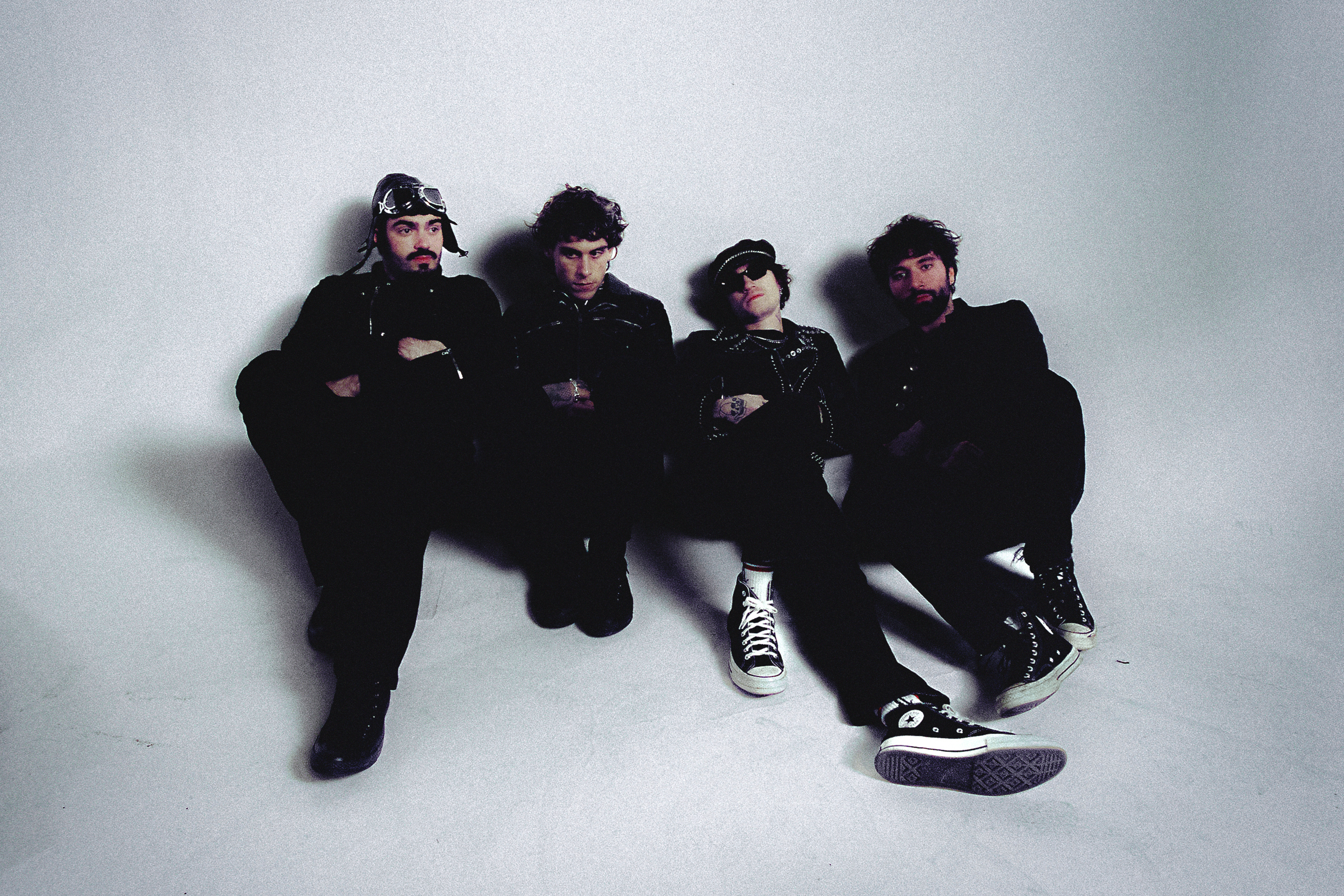

Background information
- Genres: Dance-punk; Garage rock
- Years active: 2018–present
- Label: Warner Records
- Members: Alex Alvarez; Garrett Orseno aka DJ Topgun; John Luther; Jonny Ransom
- Website: www.alexsucks.com

Alexsucks (styled ALEXSUCKS) is an American dance-punk rock band based in Los Angeles. The members are vocalist and guitarist Alex Alvarez, bassist Garrett Orseno aka DJ Topgun, guitarist John Luther, and drummer Jonny Ransom. They became known in the early 2020s for a mix of garage rock and dance-punk, with influences including The Clash and disco beats, and for their many million-streaming singles. They are signed to Warner Records.

== Formation and early career ==
The band's four original members met through skateboarding. They launched their career in 2018 when Alvarez relocated to Los Angeles.

Their debut EP, Angsty Teen, was released in 2021, but their breakout single came out in November of that year. "Talk To You" was their first track to hit a million streams.

== 2023–2026 ==
Their first Billboard charting single was "6 Pack and Cigarettes" from their debut full-length album The Gutter, produced by Brendan O'Brien, which came out in July 2023. The day after its release the band played a sold-out show at the Roxy. Their touring in 2023–24 included appearances with The Black Keys and Plain White T's.

In October 2024 they released the EP Warm Beers, which Alternative Press wrote "spans the worlds of alternative rock, dance-punk, and old-school MTV." That year they toured with Ekkstacy, played the Life is Beautiful festival, and opened for the Red Hot Chili Peppers at the Forum in Los Angeles.

Their first headlining tour, the 19-stop "Dance Punch Cry," began at House of Blues in San Diego and sold out U.S. venues in March–April 2025. By the time of this tour their popularity was such that fans "knew every lyric" and some were following the band from city to city to attend multiple concerts, according to Off the Record Press. In 2025 they also played Lollapalooza. Their 2025 singles "What We're Doing Here" received more than six million streams on Spotify and the singles "Flowers in the Dirt" and "Worm in the Sun" also received millions of streams.

Their album Autopilot was released by Warner Records on February 20, 2026. They have a U.S.-and-Canada headlining tour scheduled for 2026.
