= Send track =

Send tracks (sometimes simply called Sends) are the software audio routing equivalent to the aux-sends found on multitrack sound mixing/sequencing consoles.

In audio recording, a given song is almost always made up of multiple tracks, with each instrument or sound on its own track (for example, one track could contain the drums, one for the guitar, one for a vocal, etc). Further, each track can be separately adjusted in many ways, such as changing the volume, adding effects, and so on. This can be done with individual hardware components, commonly known as "outside the box," or via software applications known as DAWs (Digital Audio Workstations), commonly known as "inside the box."

Send tracks are tracks that aren't (normally) used to record sound on themselves, but to apply those adjustments to multiple, perhaps even all, tracks the same way. For example: if the drums are not on one track, but are instead spread out across multiple tracks (which is common), there is often the desire to treat them all the same in terms of volume, effects, etc. Instead of doing that for each track, you can set up a single send track to apply to all of them.

== Advantages ==
Because one can treat numerous tracks uniformly with a single send track, they can save a lot of time and resources. They are also inherently more flexible than their hardware equivalent since any number of send tracks can be created as needed. For more complicated effect chains, send tracks also allow their output to be routed to other send tracks, which can switch their routing to other send tracks in turn. The solutions offered by most multi-track software provide musicians with an easier (although arguably less hands-on) approach to controlling sends and their respective effects on the audio.
