= Neil Jacobson =

American music executive (born 1977)

- Born: April 28, 1977 (age 49); Long Island, New York, U.S.
- Education: Berklee College of Music
- Occupations: Founder, Hallwood Media
- Spouse: Celine Jacobson
- Website: hallwoodmedia.com

Neil Jacobson (born 28 April 1977) is an American music executive and founder of Hallwood Media, an independent music management company, publisher, and record label. He is a former president of Geffen Records.

== Early life ==
Jacobson was born and raised in Long Island, New York. As a child, Jacobson was diagnosed with ADHD. In the fifth grade, he was kicked out of his band class due to disruptions. Jacobson’s father and the principal disagreed with the decision made, and as a result, his father bought him a drum set. He was a fan of Guns N' Roses and Nirvana. At age 15, Jacobson's focus turned to the music industry. He had been inspired to become a record label executive while working his first job as a caddy at the Deepdale Golf Club. He would also take on a job as a carpet salesman, working for Stark Carpet in New York City.

Jacobson was recommended for an internship at Arista Records' radio department after an interaction with executive Tom Ennis, whom Jacobson caddied for at Deepdale Golf Club.

In 1996, Jacobson attended the Berklee College of Music, withdrawing after four years to start his own avant garde jazz record label, Tonic Productions. During his time in college, he met and befriended Jeff Bhasker.

== Career ==
Jacobson worked with Interscope Records, a label of Universal Music Group (UMG), beginning as an assistant in the international department, which was headed by Martin Kierszenbaum, founder of Cherrytree Records. Jacobson became an international publicist, handling press campaigns and promotion for the Black Eyed Peas, 50 Cent, Gwen Stefani, N.E.R.D., Eminem, Snoop Dogg and The Game.

At the company, Jacobson was an A&R representative working alongside Jimmy Iovine for the release of multi-platinum albums and songs, including LMFAO's "Party Rock Anthem", the Black Eyed Peas' The E.N.D. (including songs such as "I Gotta Feeling", "Meet Me Halfway" and "Boom Boom Pow"), Kelis' "Flesh Tone", Robin Thicke's "Blurred Lines", DJ Snake's "Let Me Love You" (featuring Justin Bieber), "Taki Taki" (featuring Selena Gomez, Cardi B, and Ozuna), and "Lean On" (collaboration with Major Lazer, featuring MØ), and Avicii's "Wake Me Up!" He also A&R'd records from Madonna, Fergie, and the first American record by the K-pop group, Girls’ Generation, signing them to their first major US label.

In addition to A&R, Jacobson founded Interscope's internal artist management division, which hosted artists like Robin Thicke, Iggy Azalea, Fernando Garibay, and will.i.am (Jacobson also ran his label, will.i.am Music Group). He was responsible for signing DJ Snake, and songwriter/producers Jeff Bhasker (Fun, Kanye West, Mark Ronson), Emile Haynie (Lana Del Rey, Father John Misty, Lady Gaga), King Henry, Bipolar Sunshine, Alex Salibian and Beach Noise. Jacobson is also known for brokering over $200 million in catalog sales, which he has done for Emile Haynie, Jeff Bhasker and Brendan O'Brien.

In 2017, Geffen Records was relaunched, and Jacobson became its president. Artists like Yungblud, Mura Masa, Bunt, AlunaGeorge, Gryffin, and the Darkroom label (which included Billie Eilish) were represented by Geffen Records after its recreation.

In 2021, Jacobson founded The Music Acquisition Corp. (TMAC), which has been described as "the music industry's first special-purpose acquisition company". TMAC raised $230 million in its initial public offering.

=== Hallwood Media ===
In December 2019, after 17 years at UMG, Jacobson bought out the producer-writer management division at Interscope and created Hallwood Media, an independent music management company, publisher, and record label. Hallwood Media has represented artists such as 2hollis, YG, Remy Bond, Bankrol Hayden, ALEXSUCKS, David Stewart, Murda Beatz, and Sounwave.

== Recognition ==
Jacobson has been named on multiple lists recognizing his work, including Billboard’s Hip Hop Power Players List and Power Dance List, the Rolling Stone Future 25, and Variety's Hitmakers list.
