= Suno =

Music generator

- Logo since July 1, 2024
- Developers: Suno, Inc.
- Release: December 20, 2023 (2 years ago)
- Stable release: Suno v6 / September 9, 2026; 2 months ago Suno Studio 2.0 / August 13, 2026; 3 months ago
- Type: Generative artificial intelligence Music generation
- Website: suno.com

"Two Planets"
Example of a two-minute song generated by Suno AI; its lyrics were generated by ChatGPT. The Style of Music prompt was "Calm, psychedelic rock".

Suno is a generative artificial intelligence music creation platform. It is designed to generate music that can include vocals and instrumentation. The platform was initially developed by Suno, Inc., of Cambridge, Massachusetts. Suno has been widely available since December 20, 2023, after the launch of a web application and a partnership with Microsoft, which included Suno as a plugin in Microsoft Copilot.

The program operates by producing songs based on prompts provided by its users, which can include text, audio, images, and video. In September 2026, Suno replaced its earlier models with the v6 family, which it said was developed with industry partners including Warner Music Group, BMG, and Believe.

The company has been sued by the Recording Industry Association of America for copyright infringement. As of September 2026, it had settled with Warner Music Group and BMG and signed licensing deals with both, as well as with Believe, while Universal Music Group and Sony Music remained plaintiffs. In September 2026, the two companies filed a second lawsuit that extends their claims to the v6 models. A 2026 hack of the company revealed that it had scraped content from YouTube Music, Genius, Deezer and several other music and audio services, as well as podcasts, for use as training data.

== History ==
Suno, Inc., was founded by four people: Mikey Shulman, Georg Kucsko, Martin Camacho, and Keenan Freyberg. They all worked for Kensho, an AI startup, before starting their own company in Cambridge, Massachusetts.

In April 2023, Suno released their open-source text-to-speech and audio model called "Bark" on GitHub. On March 21, 2024, Suno released its V3 version for all users. The new version allowed users to create a limited number of four-minute songs using a free account. Users can pay for more features. In April 2024, a sentimental ballad was generated with Suno based on the text of the MIT License.

In June 2024, a lawsuit, led by the Recording Industry Association of America, was filed against Suno and Udio alleging widespread infringement of copyrighted sound recordings. The lawsuit sought to bar the companies from training on copyrighted music, as well as damages of up to $150,000 per work from infringements that have already taken place. On July 1, 2024, a mobile app for Suno was released.

In October 2024, one day after thousands of musicians including Thom Yorke and ABBA's Björn Ulvaeus signed a letter calling for Suno to stop training its model on copyrighted music, Timbaland endorsed Suno in a video on the company's YouTube channel. On November 19, 2024, Suno upgraded its AI song model program to v4.

In January 2025, Mikey Shulman remarked on the 20VC podcast, "I think the majority of people don't enjoy the majority of the time they spend making music", a comment of which he later said, "I really wish I had chosen different words." In May 2025, Suno released v4.5.

In July 2025, Suno user imoliver signed a record deal with Hallwood Media, which became the first instance of a traditional music label signing an AI-based creator. The AI-artist Xania Monet later signed with Hallwood for US$3 million. Monet's songs were generated by Suno AI by poet Telisha Jones.

In September 2025, Suno released its v5 model and launched Suno Studio, a browser-based generative audio workstation offered in beta to Premier subscribers, which lets users generate and arrange stems on a multitrack timeline and export them as audio or MIDI. In October 2025, Suno released v4.5-all as a free model for all users.

In November 2025, Suno settled Warner Music Group's copyright claims against it and signed a licensing deal with the company. Under the agreement, WMG artists and songwriters can opt in to have their names, images, likenesses, voices, and compositions used in AI-generated music on Suno, and are compensated for taking part. Suno said it would launch new, licensed models during 2026. As part of the settlement, Suno also acquired the concert discovery platform Songkick from WMG.

On March 26, 2026, Suno released v5.5, which introduced three features. Voices let Pro and Premier subscribers record or upload their own singing to use on generated tracks, and custom models let them train a personalized version of v5.5 on at least six tracks from their own catalog, up to three models each. My Taste, a personalization feature, was available to all users.

In August 2026, Suno signed a global licensing deal with BMG Rights Management covering BMG's recorded music and publishing catalogs, which BMG described as a "global alliance" and which also settled Suno's past use of the company's recordings and songs.

On August 13, 2026, Suno released Studio 2.0, which added MIDI editing, a chat-based assistant, audio effects, automation and updated stem separation to Suno Studio. On September 3, 2026, ahead of the v6 launch, Suno introduced monthly download limits of 20 songs for Pro subscribers and 60 for Premier subscribers, with no limit for Premier subscribers exporting from Suno Studio, a policy Suno said was designed to limit the mass distribution of songs on streaming platforms. Free users who joined before that date received up to seven lifetime trial downloads.

On September 8, 2026, Suno announced a global partnership with Believe and its self-distribution platform TuneCore, under which music from participating artists and labels would be included in Suno's new models, and tracks made with those models would become eligible for distribution through both services. Believe had begun blocking the distribution of tracks made on unlicensed AI platforms, including Suno, in April 2026.

=== v6 and later ===
On September 9, 2026, Suno launched v6, a family of three models: the flagship v6 and the more experimental v6-wild, both limited to paying Pro and Premier subscribers, and v6-mini, a faster model available to all users. Suno retired all of its previous models on the same day.

The free v6-mini model replaced v4.5-all, which had been Suno's free model since October 2025. Suno describes v6-mini as "a faster, more efficient version" of its premium v6 models, and v6-wild, which is intended for experimentation, as "less predictable and more varied".

New capabilities introduced with v6 include editing a single section or lyric of an existing song through plain-language instructions while leaving the rest intact, combining elements of several songs into a mashup in a single request, and sampling and isolating parts of a track to build a new beat. The v6 models also generate music from a mix of text, audio, image, and video inputs.

Suno said v6 was developed with its industry partners Warner Music Group, BMG, and Believe. According to chief product officer Jack Brody, a portion of Suno's revenue would be shared with these partners from launch, with the rightsholders responsible for distributing the payments.

On October 1, 2026, Suno released a beta version of Speech, a model that it described as the first to generate voice and music together as one track, producing spoken audio set to original background music. After a month of testing with a small group of users, it was opened to all users on web and mobile.

== Copyright ==
In 2024, Suno, Inc., was sued by the Recording Industry Association of America for copyright infringement, and thousands of musicians have signed a letter demanding that the company cease using copyrighted music in their training data. While Suno refused to disclose the dataset used to train its artificial intelligence, a 2026 hack of the company revealed that content had been scraped from a range of music and audio services. 404 Media reported that the two largest datasets were of YouTube Music audio—labeled "youtube_music" and "ytm_tagged"—at roughly 114,000 and 152,000 hours, with smaller sets drawn from Pond5, the International Music Score Library Project, Genius, Deezer, Jamendo, Freesound and MuseScore, as well as podcasts collected through RSS feeds. YouTube scraping was done through proxies from the company Bright Data.

In August 2026, UMG, Capitol Records and Sony Music amended their complaint to add a claim under the Digital Millennium Copyright Act's anti-circumvention provisions, alleging that Suno had circumvented YouTube's anti-downloading technology. In its answer the following month, Suno admitted that it had obtained audio from YouTube for training using yt-dlp, but argued that one or more of the labels lacked standing to bring the new claim. Suno pleaded fair use and, as a second defense, copyright misuse and unclean hands, repeating its allegation from its August 2024 answer that the labels had "engaged in anticompetitive activities that extend an unlawful monopoly over the production and commercialization of music".

For v6, according to Brody, the models were trained from scratch on data different from that used for Suno's earlier models, including data licensed from its partners and user data. Suno said the user data was preference data, such as signals about which of two generated versions of a song a user preferred, rather than audio uploaded by users. Brody said the training data did not include data from UMG or Sony Music, which remained plaintiffs in the RIAA-coordinated lawsuit alleging copyright infringement in the training of Suno's earlier models.

On September 18, 2026, UMG and Sony filed a second lawsuit against Suno in the U.S. District Court for the District of Massachusetts, after the judge in the RIAA-coordinated case had declined in August to let them add 61,026 further recordings to it. The new complaint covers 60,202 sound recordings and alleges that training v6 on the outputs of Suno's earlier models, which it says were trained on copied recordings, "launders" the infringement rather than eliminating it: "v6 is not a fresh start; it is the fruit of the same poisoned tree." The labels seek an injunction and damages, including statutory damages of up to $150,000 per infringed work, and have demanded a jury trial. A Suno spokesperson called the claims "fundamentally flawed on both the facts and the law" and said v6 had been trained on "content licensed from our partners, interactions including creations and preference signals from our community, and the accumulated learnings from our team". According to Music Business Worldwide, this appeared to be the first time Suno had publicly included user "creations" in v6's training data, having told the publication at launch that the user data was preference data.

As of September 2026, Suno was facing further legal action beyond the RIAA-coordinated suit. On July 31, 2026, a Munich regional court ruled against the company in a case brought by the German collecting society GEMA. The Danish society Koda sued Suno in Copenhagen in November 2025, and SOCAN filed a claim in Canada's Federal Court on September 2, 2026. Round Hill Music sued Suno and Bright Data on August 17, 2026, seeking damages it said could approach or exceed $1 billion, and on September 1, 2026, the musician Jason Isbell and three other artists filed a proposed class action alleging that Suno had commercially exploited their names and likenesses without consent.

== See also ==
- Stable Audio – music generator from Stability AI
