= Slopaganda =

AI-generated content used for political manipulation

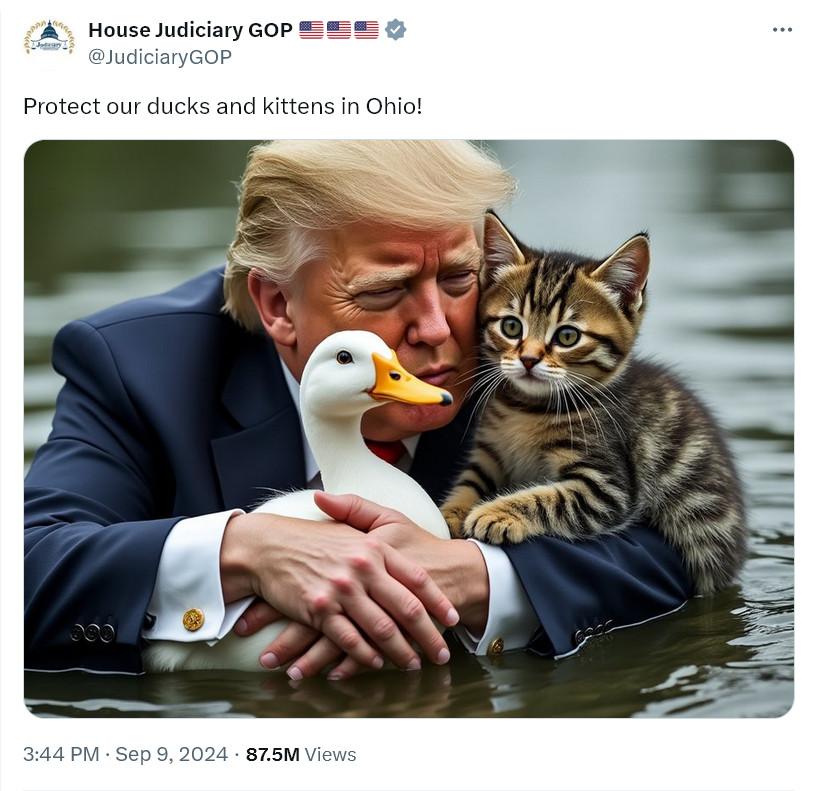
Twitter post by the U.S. Republican Party's account for the United States House Committee on the Judiciary on September 9, 2024, referencing the Springfield pet-eating hoax with an AI-generated picture of then-candidate President Trump hugging a cat and a duck with the caption reading "Protect our ducks and kittens in Ohio!"

Slopaganda is a portmanteau of "slop" and "propaganda", referring to AI-generated content designed to manipulate beliefs, emotions, and political decision-making at scale. The term is credited to Michał Klincewicz, an assistant professor in the Department of Computational Cognitive Science at Tilburg University, in 2025.

== Definition ==
Slopaganda is distinguished from traditional propaganda by three features: scale, scope, and speed. Generative AI makes it possible to produce large volumes of content quickly and at low cost, allows for highly personalised and targeted messaging to specific sub-audiences, and leverages the hyper-connectivity of social networks to accelerate dissemination beyond what conventional media could achieve. Repeated exposure to Slopaganda conflicts with our psychological defense mechanism, bringing confusion to individuals with half truths and false information.

Slopaganda can be micro-targeted — tailored to individuals based on estimated prior beliefs to reinforce political biases or emotional associations. The authors note that it need not aim at literal deception: much slopaganda is expressive rather than truth-apt, designed to create emotional associations rather than false factual beliefs.

== Relation to "AI slop" ==
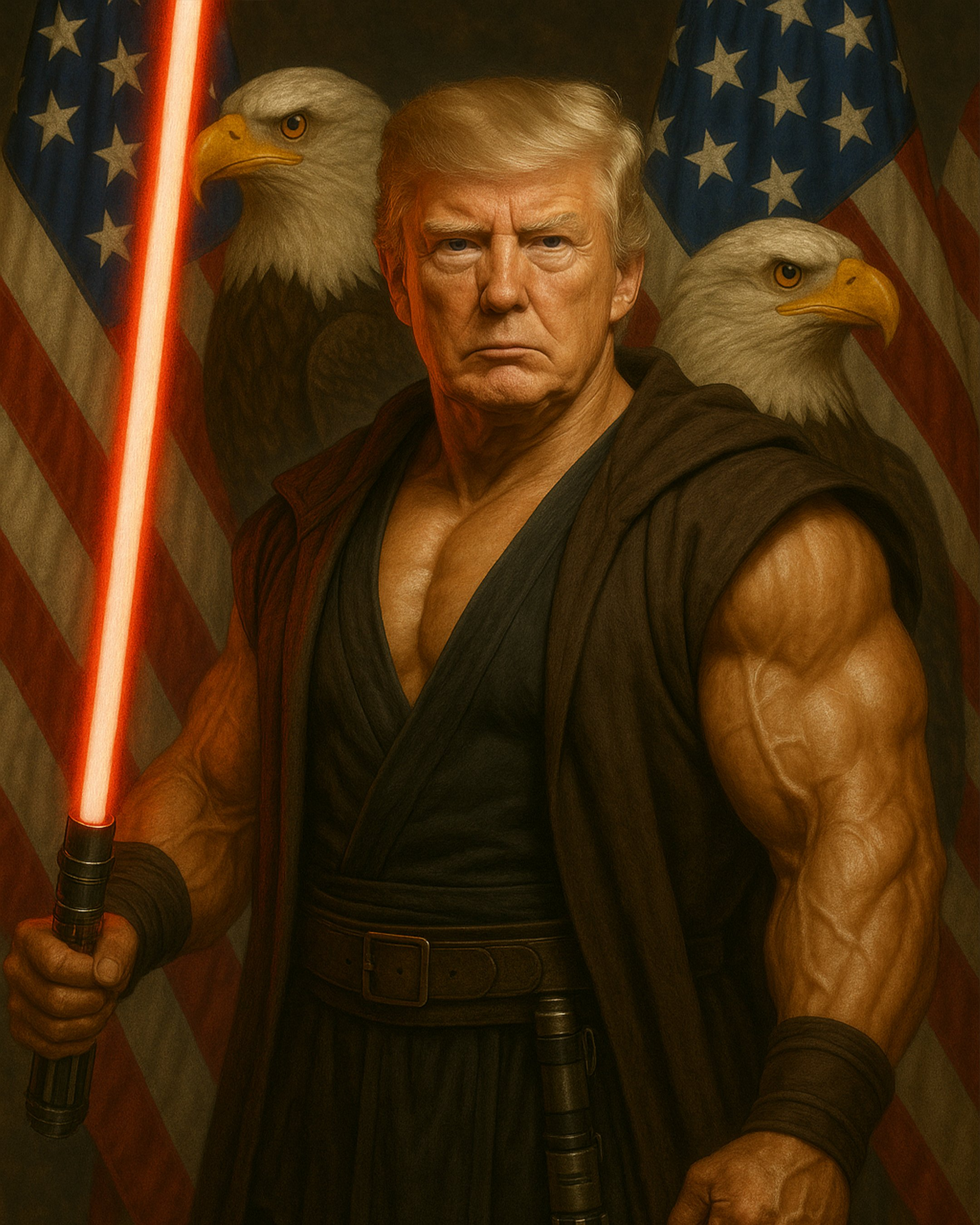
AI-generated image depicting Donald Trump wielding a lightsaber

Slopaganda is a subset of "AI slop" — low-quality, mass-produced AI-generated content — distinguished by intent. Where AI slop may be produced indifferently for commercial or engagement-farming purposes, slopaganda is deployed with a deliberate political or ideological goal.

== Noted examples ==
Examples discussed by the term's originators include Donald Trump's prolific use of AI in Truth Social posts and Iranian Lego-themed music videos. AI-generated videos posted by the White House mixing real military footage with clips from films and video games and deepfake audio imitating political candidates during the 2024 US presidential campaign have also been given the label slopaganda. Another example of Slopaganda is an account from Iran, Explosive Media on X, that posts videos depicting Trump and the United States in a negative connotation. The account also features other videos including the Epstein Files, as well as one showing Trump falling through a whirlwind of the files. Another video tells the viewer that Iran is “standing here for everyone your system ever wronged.” while George Floyd is shown under a policeman’s boot.

Slopaganda has also been documented outside the US-Iran context. In April 2026, Canada's Media Ecosystem Observatory identified a network of YouTube channels, based outside Canada, producing large volumes of fabricated polls and coordinated AI-generated messages supporting an Alberta separatist referendum question. In Poland, a TikTok network known as "Prawilne Polki" used AI-generated avatars of young women in patriotic dress to promote messaging calling for Poland to leave the European Union.

== See also ==
- AI-generated content in American politics
- Algorithmic radicalization – Radicalization via social media algorithms
- Brain rot – Slang for poor-quality digital content
- Clanker – Pejorative for robots and AI software
- Computational propaganda – Propaganda method based on digital technologies
- Dead Internet theory – Concept involving online bot activity
- Deepfake – Realistic artificially generated media
- Enshittification – Decline in online platform quality
- Eternal September – Internet jargon
- Misinformation – Incorrect or misleading information
- Moltbook – Social network exclusively for AI agents
