= Neo-Luddism =

Philosophy opposing modern technology

Neo-Luddism or new Luddism is a philosophy opposing many forms of modern technology. The term Luddite is generally used as a pejorative applied to people showing technophobic leanings. The name is based on the historical legacy of the English Luddites, who were active between 1811 and 1817. While the original Luddites were mostly concerned with the economic implications of improving technology in regard to industrialization, neo-Luddites tend to have a broader and more holistic distrust of technological improvement.

Neo-Luddism is a leaderless movement of non-affiliated groups that resist modern technologies and dictate a return of some or all technologies to a more primitive level. Neo-Luddites are characterized by one or more of the following practices: passively abandoning the use of technology, protesting technology harmful to the environment, advocating simple living, or sabotaging technology. The modern neo-Luddite movement has connections with the anti-globalization movement, anarcho-primitivism, radical environmentalism, and deep ecology.

Neo-Luddism is based on the concern of the technological impact on individuals, their communities, and/or the environment. Neo-Luddism stipulates the use of the precautionary principle for all new technologies, insisting that technologies be proven safe before adoption, due to the unknown effects that new technologies might inspire.

== Philosophy ==
In 1990, attempting to found a unified movement and reclaim the term Luddite, Chellis Glendinning published her "Notes towards a Neo-Luddite manifesto". In this paper, Glendinning describes neo-Luddites as "20th century citizens—activists, workers, neighbors, social critics, and scholars—who question the predominant modern worldview, which preaches that unbridled technology represents progress". Glendinning voices an opposition to technologies that she deems destructive to communities or are materialistic and rationalistic. She proposes that technology encourages biases, and therefore should question if technologies have been created for specific interests, to perpetuate their specific values including short-term efficiency, ease of production and marketing, as well as profit. Glendinning also says that secondary aspects of technology, including social, economic and ecological implications, and not personal benefit need to be considered before adoption of technology into the technological system.

Neo-Luddism calls for slowing or stopping the development of new technologies. Neo-Luddism prescribes a lifestyle that abandons specific technologies, because of its belief that this is the best prospect for the future. Academics Kevin Robins and Frank Webster put it as "a return to nature and what are imagined as more natural communities". In the place of industrial capitalism, neo-Luddism prescribes small-scale agricultural communities such as those of the Amish and the Chipko movement in Nepal and India as models for the future.

Neo-Luddism denies the ability of any new technology to solve current problems, such as environmental degradation, nuclear warfare and biological weapons, without creating more, potentially dangerous, problems.

=== Vision of the future without intervention ===
Neo-Luddism often establishes stark predictions about the effect of new technologies. Although there is not a cohesive vision of the ramifications of technology, neo-Luddism predicts that a future without technological reform has dire consequences. Neo-Luddites believe that current technologies are a threat to humanity and to the natural world in general, and that a future societal collapse is possible or even probable.

These predictions include changes in humanity's place in the future due to replacement of humans by computers, genetic decay of humans due to lack of natural selection, biological engineering of humans, misuse of technological power including disasters caused by genetically modified organisms, nuclear warfare, and biological weapons; control of humanity using surveillance, propaganda, pharmacological control, and psychological control; humanity failing to adapt to the future manifesting as an increase in psychological disorders, widening economic and political inequality, widespread social alienation, a loss of community, and massive unemployment; technology causing environmental degradation due to shortsightedness, overpopulation, and overcrowding.

=== Types of intervention ===
In her 1990 paper "Notes towards a Neo-Luddite manifesto", Glendinning proposes dismantling the following technologies: electromagnetic technologies, chemical technologies, nuclear technologies, and genetic engineering. She argues in favor of the "search for new technological forms" which are local in scale and promote social and political freedom.

== Movement ==
Contemporary neo-Luddites are a widely diverse group of loosely affiliated or non-affiliated groups which includes "writers, academics, students, families, Amish, Mennonites, Quakers, environmentalists, "fallen-away yuppies", "ageing flower children" and "young idealists seeking a technology-free environment". Some neo-Luddites see themselves as victims of technology trying to prevent further victimization (such as Citizens Against Pesticide Misuse and Parents Against Underage Smartphones). Others see themselves as advocates for the natural order and resist environmental degradation by technology (such as Earth First!).

One neo-Luddite assembly was the "Second Neo-Luddite Congress", held 13–15 April 1996, at a Quaker meeting hall in Barnesville, Ohio. On 24 February 2001, the "Teach-In on Technology and Globalization" was held at Hunter College in New York city with the purpose of bringing together critics of technology and globalization. The two figures who are seen as the movement's founders are Glendinning and Kirkpatrick Sale. Prominent neo-Luddites include educator S. D. George, ecologist Stephanie Mills, Theodore Roszak, Clifford Stoll, Bill McKibben, Neil Postman, Wendell Berry, Alan Marshall, and Gene Logsdon. Postman, however, did not consider himself a Luddite.

=== Relationship to violence and vandalism ===
Some neo-Luddites use vandalism or violence to achieve social change and promote their cause.

The American terrorist Ted Kaczynski, also known as the Unabomber, initially sabotaged developments near his cabin but dedicated himself to getting back at the system after discovering a road had been built over a plateau he had considered beautiful. Between 1978 and 1995, Kaczynski engaged in a nationwide bombing campaign against modern technology, planting or mailing numerous home-made bombs, killing three people and injuring 23 others. In his 1995 work Industrial Society and Its Future, Kaczynski states:

The kind of revolution we have in mind will not necessarily involve an armed uprising against any government. It may or may not involve physical violence, but it will not be a POLITICAL revolution. Its focus will be on technology and economics, not politics.

In August 2011 in Mexico a group or person calling itself Individualists Tending to the Wild perpetrated an attack with a bomb at the Monterrey Institute of Technology and Higher Education, State of Mexico Campus, intended for the coordinator of its Business Development Center and Technology Transfer. The attack was accompanied by the publication of a manifesto criticizing nanotechnology and computer science.

Sale says that neo-Luddites are not motivated to commit violence or vandalism. The manifesto of the "Second Luddite Congress", which Sale took a major part in writing, attempts to redefine neo-Luddites as people who reject violent action.

In May 2012, credit for the shooting of Roberto Adinolfi, an Ansaldo Nucleare executive, was claimed by an anarchist group who targeted him for stating that none of the deaths following the 2011 Tōhoku earthquake and tsunami were caused by the Fukushima Daiichi nuclear disaster itself:

Adinolfi knows well that it is only a matter of time before a European Fukushima kills on our continent [...] Science in centuries past promised us a golden age, but it is pushing us towards self destruction and slavery [...] With our action we give back to you a small part of the suffering that you scientists are bringing to the world.

== History ==
=== Origins of contemporary critiques of technology in literature ===
According to Julian Young, Martin Heidegger was a Luddite in his early philosophical phase and believed in the destruction of modern technology and a return to an earlier agrarian world. However, the later Heidegger did not see technology as wholly negative and did not call for its abandonment or destruction. In The Question Concerning Technology (1953), Heidegger posited that the modern technological "mode of Being" was one which viewed the natural world, plants, animals, and even human beings as a "standing-reserve"—resources to be exploited as means to an end. To illustrate this "monstrousness", Heidegger uses the example of a hydroelectric plant on the Rhine river which turns the river from an unspoiled natural wonder to just a supplier of hydropower. In this sense, technology is not just the collection of tools, but a way of being in the world and of understanding the world which is instrumental and grotesque. According to Heidegger, this way of being defines the modern way of living in the West. For Heidegger, this technological process ends up reducing beings to not-beings, which Heidegger calls 'the abandonment of being' and involves the loss of any sense of awe and wonder, as well as an indifference to that loss.

One of the first major contemporary anti-technological thinkers was French philosopher Jacques Ellul. In his The Technological Society (1964), Ellul argued that logical and mechanical organization "eliminates or subordinates the natural world". Ellul defined technique as the entire totality of organizational methods and technology with a goal toward maximum rational efficiency. According to Ellul, technique has an impetus which tends to drown out human concerns: "The only thing that matters technically is yield, production. This is the law of technique; this yield can only be obtained by the total mobilization of human beings, body and soul, and this implies the exploitation of all human psychic forces." In Industrial Revolution England, machines became cheaper to use than men. The five counties of Yorkshire, Lancashire, Cheshire, Derbyshire, and Nottinghamshire had a small uprising where they threatened those hired to guard the machines. Another critic of political and technological expansion was Lewis Mumford, who wrote The Myth of the Machine. The views of Ellul influenced the ideas of the infamous American neo-Luddite terrorist Ted Kaczynski. The opening of Kaczynski's manifesto reads: "The Industrial Revolution and its consequences have been a disaster for the human race." Other philosophers of technology who have questioned the validity of technological progress include Albert Borgmann, Don Ihde and Hubert Dreyfus.

== See also ==
- Category:Neo-Luddites
- Antiscience – Attitudes that reject science and the scientific method
- Green conservatism – Combination of conservatism and environmentalism
- CLODO – Neo-Luddite French anarchist organization, 1980s
- Development criticism – Sociological theory
- Discrimination against robots
  - Violence against robots
  - Clanker – Pejorative for robots and AI software
- Green anarchy – Branch of anarchism focused on the environment
- Hallucination (artificial intelligence) – Erroneous AI-generated content presented as true
- John Zerzan – American philosopher and author (born 1943)
- Man and Technics – 1931 book by Oswald Spengler
- Metaverse § Criticism and concerns
- MOVE – American Black separatist group
- Pentti Linkola – Finnish ecologist (1932–2020)
- Reactionary – Political view advocating return to a previous societal state
  - New World Order – Conspiracy theory regarding a totalitarian world government
    - Brave New World – 1932 dystopian novel by Aldous Huxley
- "On the Origin of the 'Influencing Machine' in Schizophrenia" – 1919 article in psychoanalysis
- Technophobia – Fear or discomfort with technology
  - Existential risk from artificial intelligence – Hypothesized risk to human existence
    - AI takeover – Artificial intelligence scenario
- Technological singularity – Hypothetical event
- Uncanny valley – Hypothesis that human replicas elicit revulsion
- "Why The Future Doesn't Need Us" – 2000 article by Bill Joy
