= Explosive Media =

Iranian digital media platform

- اخبار انفجاری
- Nickname: Akhbar Enfejari
- Formation: 2025
- Location: Iran
- Official language: English, Persian

Explosive Media (also known as Explosive News, Persian: اخبار انفجاری, romanized: Akhbar Enfejari, lit. '"Explosive News"') is an Iranian digital media enterprise known for producing AI-generated satirical pro-Iran propaganda videos for the Iranian government. Its short films during the 2026 Iran War—produced in the style of Lego movies and lampooning the U.S. side in the conflict and mocking the U.S. president Donald Trump—were widely shared both by Iranian and American social-media accounts becoming, according to The New Yorker, "inescapable artifacts" of the war. Within a month following the outbreak of hostilities, the organization's videos had accrued millions of views and achieved widespread virality. This was accomplished through the group's "in-depth understanding of American culture and media."

Explosive Media was established in 2025, initially producing short commentary videos before transitioning its output to animated satirical propaganda films. A representative of Explosive Media described the outfit as an anonymous "student-led media team with a background in social activism" unconnected to government. In an interview with the BBC, a representative said that the Iranian government was a "customer" of the enterprise, which had received direct commissions for several projects from Iranian government officials.

An Iranian AI-generated Lego-style propaganda video produced by Explosive Media

Generative AI music video of the song "L.O.S.E.R." by Explosive Media.

== Content analysis ==
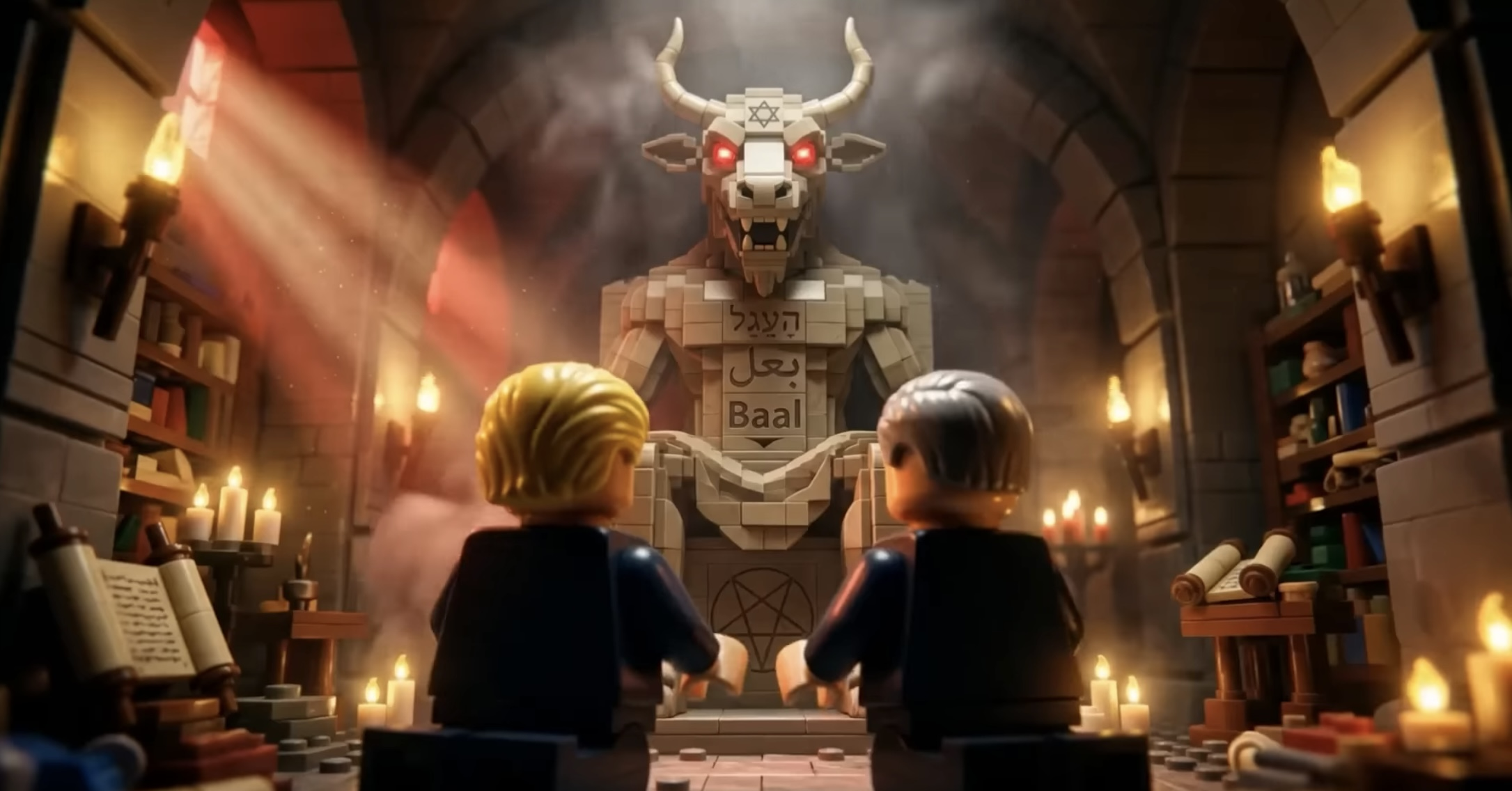
AI generated caricatures of Donald Trump and Benjamin Netanyahu praying to Baal as Lego minifigures

The videos are produced in English and target Western audiences, often incorporating references to American politics. Marc Owen Jones, a professor at Northwestern University in Qatar, described the Lego videos as very good and well thought out with a lot of details in them. He also noted there was a real story behind the videos, unlike American propaganda, which he felt mostly relied on Hollywood movie clips. One widely-shared clip depicted Lego versions of Trump and Israeli Prime Minister Benjamin Netanyahu sitting beside Satan, with Trump holding a binder marked "Epstein Files" before launching a rocket at Iran, followed by a sequence showing the aftermath of a strike on an Iranian girls' school that killed at least 175 people. Another video featured an AI-generated rap containing the hook "L.O.S.E.R." and flipped Trump's "Make America Great Again" slogan into "MIGA" ("Make Israel Great Again"), showing a sweaty Trump being questioned about the Epstein files and lost in a maze designed like the Iranian flag. Pete Hegseth, America's secretary of war, is shown as a vomiting drunk with crusader tattoos.

Graphika traced an early video—showing a Lego Trump waking in a cold sweat during an Iranian attack on U.S. warships—to the Telegram account of Explosive Media. Within an hour of the original post, the video was reposted by the Tasnim News Agency (affiliated with the Islamic Revolutionary Guard Corps) and by RT, the Russian state media outlet; the RT repost earned 850,000 views on X.

The group told Al Jazeera that the green and red colours prominent in the animations follow Shia tradition, with green symbolising Husayn ibn Ali's fight for justice against oppression and red representing the oppressor. One video, titled "One Vengeance for All" and released on 29 March 2026, depicted missiles bearing dedications to victims of US actions—including Native Americans, survivors of the Abu Ghraib prison, and the passengers of Iran Air Flight 655—before showing statues of Trump and Netanyahu collapsing.

Similar Lego-style videos were produced by other Iranian accounts, such as PersiaBoi and Southern Punk, and the format spread to Pakistan, where the outlet Nukta media created its own version ahead of Iran–US negotiations in Islamabad on 11 April 2026.

== Reactions ==
=== Public reaction ===
According to an analysis by Cyabra, the AI-generated LEGO style videos from tens of thousands of accounts received 145 million views in the first weeks of the war. A narrower Cyabra study of 47 coordinated accounts found that their videos received 40 million views, primarily on TikTok. On Instagram, Explosive Media's most popular post, featuring Lego Trump and Netanyahu, had accrued more than 260,000 views, while a single repost on X from a Brazilian user with nearly 400,000 followers gained 2.5 million views. Joseph Bodner and Krysia Sikora of the Institute for Strategic Dialogue, a pro-democracy NGO, found that two pro-Iran networks had accumulated more than a billion views on X in the first month of the war.

The clips were adopted by No Kings protesters in the United States, who used the anti-Trump imagery in their demonstrations.

=== Description as slopaganda ===
In 2025, philosophers Mark Alfano and Michał Klincewicz coined the term "slopaganda" to describe AI-generated propaganda, using Trumps AI generated images as an example. Following Explosive Media's videos, they labelled it as a further example of slopaganda. The New Yorker writer Kyle Chayka described the videos as "perhaps the world’s most potent example of slopaganda yet, changing hearts and minds—or at least generating lots of clicks—one exploding toy battleship at a time." According to Emma Briant, a leading propaganda expert, slopaganda is too weak a term to capture the power of the videos which she described as "highly sophisticated."

== Social media ==
=== Termination of accounts ===
In April 2026, the group's accounts on YouTube and Instagram were terminated. The ban was described by Iran's foreign ministry spokesman Esmaeil Baghaee as a move aimed at suppressing the truth about the war by US-Israel against Iran. An Explosive Media spokesperson told Al Jazeera that Google removed it on the grounds of "promoting violence", a characterization the group disputed, arguing that Lego-style brick animations are not inherently violent. The BBC reported that social media platforms had been shutting down accounts distributing the Lego-style videos, but new accounts continued to appear rapidly. After YouTube and Instagram removed Explosive Media accounts in late March 2026, The New Yorker noted that the videos continued to circulate widely on X and other platforms, and the bans "seemed to have done little to slow their reach."

Politico reported that the removal of the original Explosive Media YouTube channel "only amplified interest", with one re-upload of the video reaching 2 million views and the team's latest video garnering 2,000 retweets on X within hours of posting.

== See also ==
- Media coverage of the 2026 Iran war
- Propaganda in Iran
