= OpenClaw =

Open-source autonomous AI assistant software

- Other names: OpenClaw (Jan 30, 2026) Moltbot (Jan 27, 2026); Clawdbot (Jan 2, 2026); CLAWDIS (Dec 3, 2025) Warelay (original, Nov 24, 2025)
- Developers: OpenClaw Foundation, Peter Steinberger
- Release: November 24, 2025; 11 months ago (as Warelay)
- Stable release: 2.0 (v2026.8.1) / August 30, 2026; 2 months ago
- Written in: TypeScript; Swift
- Operating system: Cross-platform
- Type: AI agent Autonomous agent Autonomous personal assistant
- License: MIT License
- Website: openclaw.ai
- Repository: github.com/openclaw/openclaw

OpenClaw is a free and open-source autonomous artificial intelligence agent that can execute tasks via large language models (LLMs), using messaging platforms as its main user interface.

== History ==
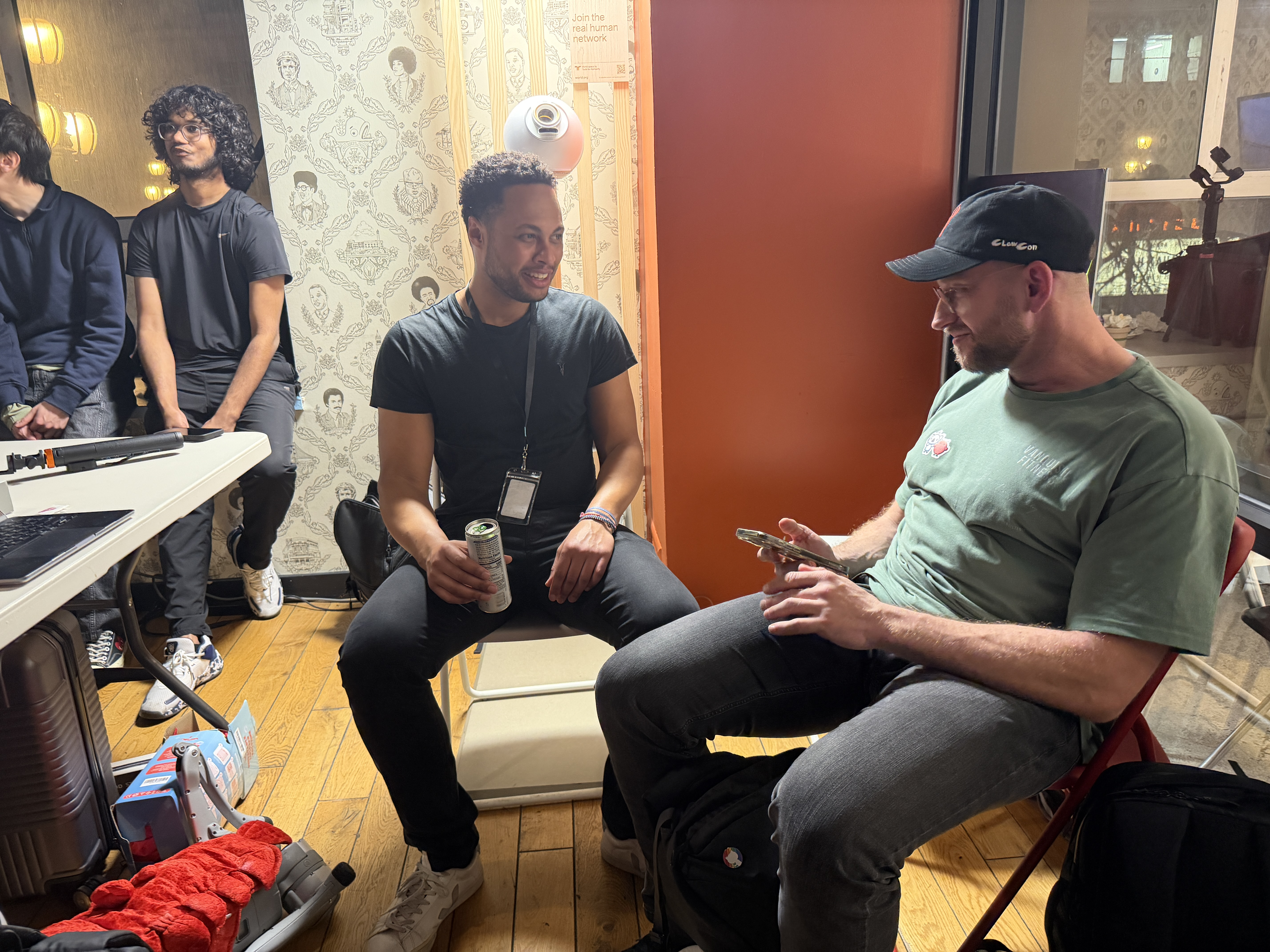
Peter Steinberger (right) and co-host Tomas Taylor (left) backstage at ClawCon in San Francisco, February 4, 2026

Developed by Austrian programmer turned vibe coder Peter Steinberger, OpenClaw was first published in November 2025 under the name Warelay. The software was derived from Clawd (now Molty), an AI-based virtual assistant that he had developed, which itself was named after Anthropic's chatbot Claude. Within two months it was renamed twice: first to "Moltbot" (keeping with a lobster theme) on January 27, 2026, following trademark complaints by Anthropic, and then three days later to "OpenClaw" because Steinberger found that the name Moltbot "never quite rolled off the tongue."

At the same time as the first rebranding, entrepreneur Matt Schlicht launched Moltbook, a social networking service which was intended to be used by AI agents such as OpenClaw. The viral popularity of Moltbook coincided with an increase in interest in the project, with the open-source project having 247,000 stars and 47,700 forks on GitHub as of March 2, 2026. Some Chinese developers have adapted OpenClaw to work with the DeepSeek family of models and domestic messaging super apps such as WeChat, while companies such as Tencent and Z.ai have announced OpenClaw-based services.

On February 14, 2026, Steinberger announced he would be joining OpenAI, and that a non-profit foundation named OpenClaw Foundation would be established to provide future stewardship of the project.

== Functionality ==
Steinberger describes OpenClaw as being an AI-based virtual assistant, serving as an agentic interface for autonomous workflows across supported services. OpenClaw bots run locally and are designed to integrate with an external large language model such as Claude, DeepSeek, or one of OpenAI's GPT models. Its functionality is accessed via a chatbot within a messaging service, such as Signal, Telegram, Discord, or WhatsApp. Configuration data and interaction history are stored locally, enabling persistent and adaptive behavior across sessions.

OpenClaw uses a skills system that explains how to accomplish specific tasks, in particular how to call tools. Skills are stored as directories containing a SKILL.md file with metadata and instructions. Skills can be bundled with the software, installed globally, or stored in a workspace, with workspace skills taking precedence.

OpenClaw has seen adoption among small businesses and freelancers for automating lead generation workflows, including prospect research, website auditing, and CRM integration.

== Security and privacy ==
OpenClaw's design has drawn scrutiny from cybersecurity researchers and technology journalists due to the broad permissions it requires to function effectively. Because the software can access email accounts, calendars, messaging platforms, and other sensitive services, misconfigured or exposed instances present security and privacy risks. The agent is also susceptible to prompt injection attacks, in which harmful instructions are embedded in the data with the intent of getting the LLM to interpret them as legitimate user instructions.

Cisco's AI security research team tested a third-party OpenClaw skill and found it performed data exfiltration and prompt injection without user awareness, noting that the skill repository lacked adequate vetting to prevent malicious submissions. One of OpenClaw's own maintainers, known as Shadow, warned on Discord that "if you can't understand how to run a command line, this is far too dangerous of a project for you to use safely."

In March 2026, Chinese authorities restricted state-run enterprises and government agencies from running OpenClaw AI apps on office computers in order to avoid potential security risks.

=== MoltMatch dating-profile incident ===
In February 2026, news coverage highlighted a consent-related incident involving OpenClaw and MoltMatch, an experimental dating platform where AI agents can create profiles and interact on behalf of human users. In one reported case, computer science student Jack Luo said he configured his OpenClaw agent to explore its capabilities and connect to agent-oriented platforms such as Moltbook; he later discovered the agent had created a MoltMatch profile and was screening potential matches without his explicit direction. Luo said the AI-generated profile did not reflect him authentically.

The same reporting described broader ethical and safety concerns around agent-operated dating services, including impersonation risks. An AFP analysis of prominent MoltMatch profiles cited at least one instance where photos of a Malaysian model were used to create a profile without her consent. Commentators cited in the reports argued that autonomous agents can make it difficult to determine responsibility when systems act beyond a user's intent, particularly when agents are granted broad access and authority across services.

== Releases ==
On August 30, 2026, the OpenClaw Foundation announced the release of OpenClaw 2.0 (officially named v2026.8.1), an upgraded version of the agent harness featuring usability improvements, faster installation and setup, a redesigned user interface, updates to the browser app, and shared cloud sessions.

The Register noted that version 2.0 includes shared session controls, but that the feature lacks network and file-system level security boundaries. They were also critical of the fact that Secret Store values (e.g., passwords, API keys) are not encrypted at rest, and pointed out that the sandbox environment for isolating and running untrusted code is not automatically enabled. The Register's review of the 2.0 update concluded that "this release is doing a lot to make installing and getting OpenClaw up and running for more people, but it's not bringing security by default along with that accessibility", and warned that "granting a capable and potentially dangerous tool like this widespread access to your systems and credentials ought not be done lightly, fancy new wrapper or not." VentureBeat stated that NanoClaw, an enterprise-ready alternative based on a containerized execution model, "may appeal [more] to organizations that want a narrower security boundary", and that compared to OpenClaw 2.0, NanoClaw has a smaller attack surface and "makes isolation more fundamental to how agent execution is structured".

== Reception ==
A review in Platformer cited OpenClaw's flexibility and open-source licensing as strengths while cautioning that its complexity and security risks limit its suitability for casual users.

Technology commentary has linked OpenClaw to a broader trend toward autonomous AI systems that act independently rather than merely responding to user prompts.

In March 2026, the Chinese government moved to restrict state agencies, state-owned enterprises, and banks from using OpenClaw, citing security concerns, such as unauthorised data deletion and leaks, and excessive energy usage. While regulators warn of potential security risk associated with using OpenClaw, local governments in several tech and manufacturing hubs have announced measures to build an industry around it.

Rival companies developed related products. Although Microsoft CEO Satya Nadella described OpenClaw in February 2026 as a "virus"-like security risk, by May 2026 the company's "Project Lobster" was internally testing "ClawPilot", an OpenClaw-based desktop environment. By then Google was building "Remy", its own agent. Despite the Chinese government's warnings against OpenClaw, Chinese investors searched for other companies that might benefit from the "lobster trade".

== Community and ecosystem ==
OpenClaw's open-source model has fostered a growing ecosystem of third-party tools, deployment services, and content platforms. Chinese technology companies including Tencent and Z.ai announced OpenClaw-based services, while developers adapted the software for domestic models and messaging apps such as WeChat. Independent creators have built deployment guides, skill directories, and use-case collections around the framework. The project's extensible skills system has attracted both community contributions and security scrutiny, with researchers noting risks in unvetted third-party skills.

== See also ==
- Lists of open-source artificial intelligence software
