= Ben Parr =

American entrepreneur and author

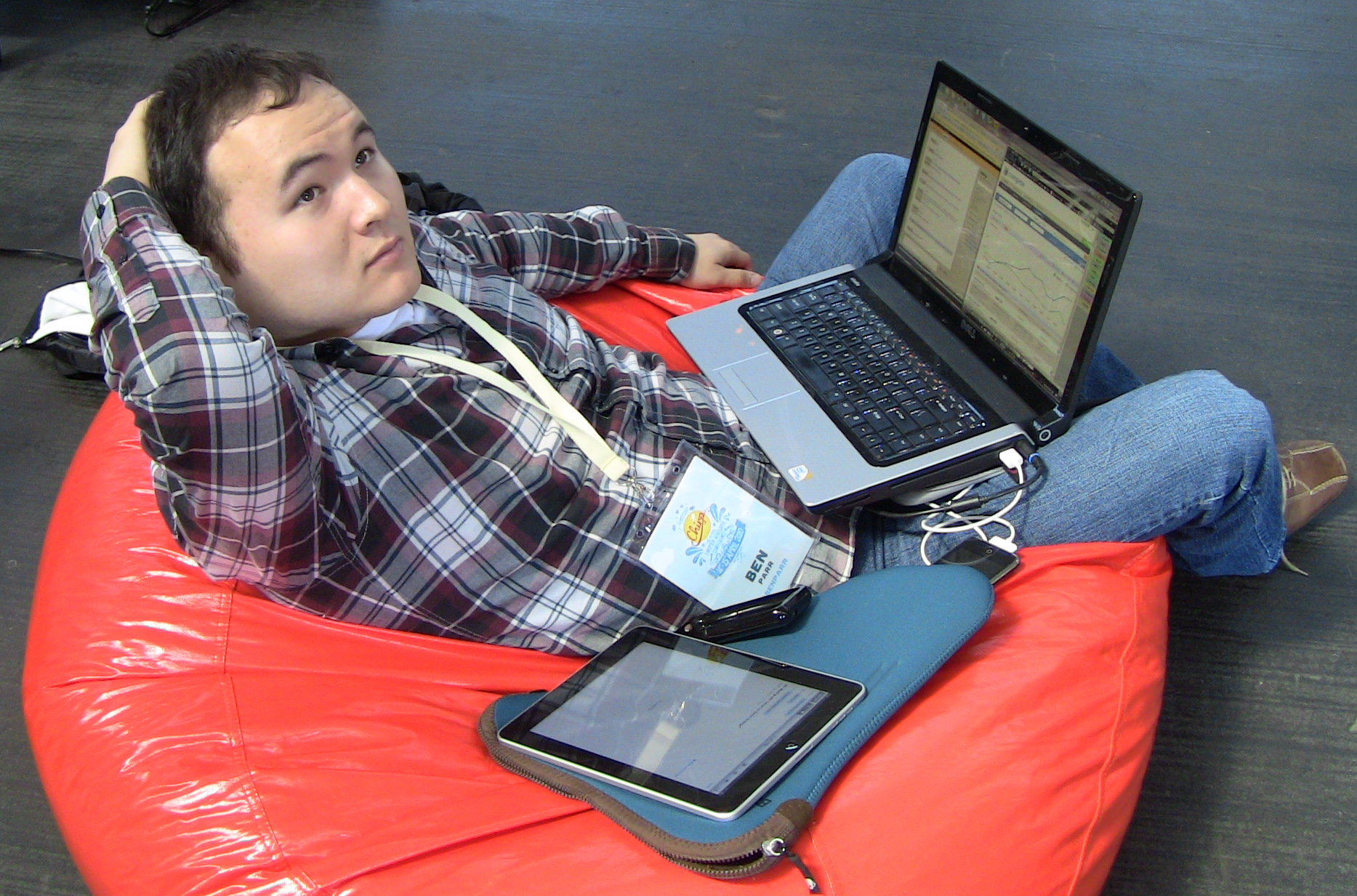
- Ben Parr at Chirp, 2010
- Born: February 12, 1985 (age 41); Princeton, Illinois, U.S.
- Citizenship: United States, Thailand
- Education: Northwestern University (BA)
- Occupations: Author, Technology journalist, Entrepreneur, Venture capitalist
- Notable work: Captivology: The Science of Capturing People's Attention; Moltbook
- Board member of: Samasource
- Spouse: Deborah Yarchun (m. 2024)
- Website: BenParr.com

Ben Parr (born February 12, 1985) is an American journalist, author, venture capitalist and entrepreneur. He is the author of Captivology: The Science of Capturing People's Attention, a book on the science and psychology of attention and how to capture the attention of others. He is the co-founder of Octane AI, a marketing automation and conversational marketing company for e-commerce, and a co-founder of artificial intelligence venture capital fund Theory Forge Ventures. In 2026, Meta Platforms acquired Moltbook, an AI agent social network created by Parr's co-founder Matt Schlicht, and both joined Meta Superintelligence Labs. He was previously a venture capitalist, the co-editor and editor-at-large of Mashable, and a columnist and commentator for CNET.

== Early life and education ==
Parr was born in 1985, in rural Princeton, Illinois to Harold E. Parr Jr. and Vilarat Nid Parr. He quit the football team to become a drum major. He earned the rank of Eagle Scout in 2002 and graduated as valedictorian from Princeton High School in 2004.

Parr is a serial entrepreneur, having started his first company while attending Northwestern University. In September 2006, during his junior year at Northwestern, he started a campaign to protest the launch of Facebook's News Feed feature. The group he created, "Students Against Facebook News Feed", peaked at over 730,000 members before Facebook acquiesced to the protests and added more privacy controls.

Parr graduated from Northwestern University in 2008 with a B.A. in Science in Human Culture, Political Science and a minor in Business Institutions. He was awarded the Kapnick Prize for his work in promoting entrepreneurship on campus. He worked as a Community Assistant at Elder Hall and was elected president of InNUvation, Northwestern's entrepreneurship club, as an undergraduate.

== Career ==
=== Early career ===
Before his graduation in 2008, Parr joined his mentors Troy Henikoff and Mark Achler to launch Free Lunch, a Facebook application development company. After Facebook changed its app developer policies, Parr moved on with Achler to work at Veritas Health.

=== Mashable ===
Parr joined Mashable as a writer in August 2008, but was promoted to Associate Editor in March 2009, Co-Editor in September 2009 and Editor-at-Large in May 2011. During his tenure, he wrote 2,446 articles focused on web technology, business and media, opened Mashable's west coast office, and helped manage Mashable's editorial team. He was fired from the company in November 2011 after a disagreement over compensation.

=== After Mashable ===
In February 2012, Parr announced that he was joining the technology news website CNET as a commentator and columnist. His column, The Social Analyst, "digs into the key companies, trends and players powering the tech and social media universe, from the smallest startups to tech giants." He retired his CNET column in 2013.

In February 2012, Parr started a company, The Peep Project, the firm attempted to change the way people interact with information. The project dissolved in April 2013.

In 2012, Parr started a seed-stage venture capital fund, DominateFund, with partners Matt Schlicht and Mazy Kazerooni. The firm coaches startups on how to get attention for their products through celebrity partnerships, press, marketing, customer acquisition and viral products. It has backed a variety of companies including uBeam, Shots, and Graft Concepts (acquired by Novatel Wireless).

=== Captivology ===
On February 4, 2014, Parr announced that he was in the process of writing his first book, Captivology: The Science of Capturing People's Attention, released by HarperCollins in March 2015. His book focuses on understanding the psychology of attention and how that scientific knowledge can be applied to capture the attention of others. His book includes interviews with Sheryl Sandberg, Steven Soderbergh, Jeff Weiner, Grant Imahara, Brian Stelter, David Copperfield, Daniel Pink, Shigeru Miyamoto, Alan Baddeley, Susan Cain, Michael Posner, Adrian Grenier and others.

Captivology has been featured in publications such as the Harvard Business Review and USA Today. The book was named the best marketing book of 2015 by Strategy+Business Magazine. In 2016, Captivology won the Small Business Book Award for marketing.

In September 2014, Parr launched a new column with Inc. Magazine, focused on business and entrepreneurship.

=== Octane AI ===
On November 2, 2016, Parr announced Octane AI, a chatbot creation platform for Facebook Messenger. The platform powers the bots used by celebrities, brands, small businesses, and publishers, including 50 Cent, Kiss, Aerosmith, and Lindsay Lohan. His company has raised $1.5 million in funding led by Evernote founder Phil Libin at General Catalyst.

In 2017, Octane AI was named one of Gartner's Cool Vendors in Mobile App Development and was featured in The New York Times.

In 2018, Octane AI announced an integration with Shopify at the Facebook F8 conference.

=== Theory Forge Ventures ===
In 2024, The Information reported that Ben Parr had started an artificial intelligence venture capital fund, Theory Forge Ventures, with his Octane AI co-founder Matt Schlicht. Theory Forge has invested in payments company Payman and email marketing tool Orita.

=== Moltbook and Meta acquisition ===
In January 2026, Parr's Octane AI co-founder Matt Schlicht launched Moltbook, a Reddit-style social network restricted to AI agents, which went viral within days of its launch and drew coverage from The New York Times, CNBC, and CNN. On March 10, 2026, Meta Platforms acquired Moltbook, bringing both Schlicht and Parr into Meta Superintelligence Labs.

=== Other work ===
Parr is a frequent public speaker and makes regular television appearances. He has been a technology commentator for CNBC, CNN, MSNBC, and NBC's Press:here. He has also made cameo appearances on Fox's Gotham and USA's Leap Year.

In 2015, Parr joined the innovation advisory board of Lufthansa. His term expired in 2018.

In March 2017, Parr was elected to the board of directors of Samasource, a non-profit business with the mission to reduce global poverty by connecting unemployed people in the United States and impoverished countries to digital work.

Parr is signed by Worldwide Speakers Group for speaking engagements and public appearances.

== Awards ==
In 2010, Parr was named a "Technology Industry Trendsetter, Luminary & Chronicler" by the Public Relations Society of America.

In 2011, Parr was named one of the top 10 tech journalists in the world by Say Media. Parr was also named San Francisco's coolest social media geek by SF Weekly.

In 2013, Parr was designated as a fellow of the Tribeca Film Festival's Disruption foundation.

In 2015, Parr was named one of the top 10 Internet of Things experts by Inc. Magazine alongside Tony Fadell, Chris Sacca and others. He was also named by Huffington Post as one of 10 people to know in Silicon Valley.

== Personal life ==
In February 2018, Parr began dating playwright Deborah Yarchun. In March 2023, the two were engaged. They married in April 2024 in Yarchun's hometown of Austin, Texas.

== Published works ==
- Parr, Ben (2015). Captivology: The Science of Capturing People's Attention. HarperOne.
