= Dead Internet theory =

Concept involving online bot activity

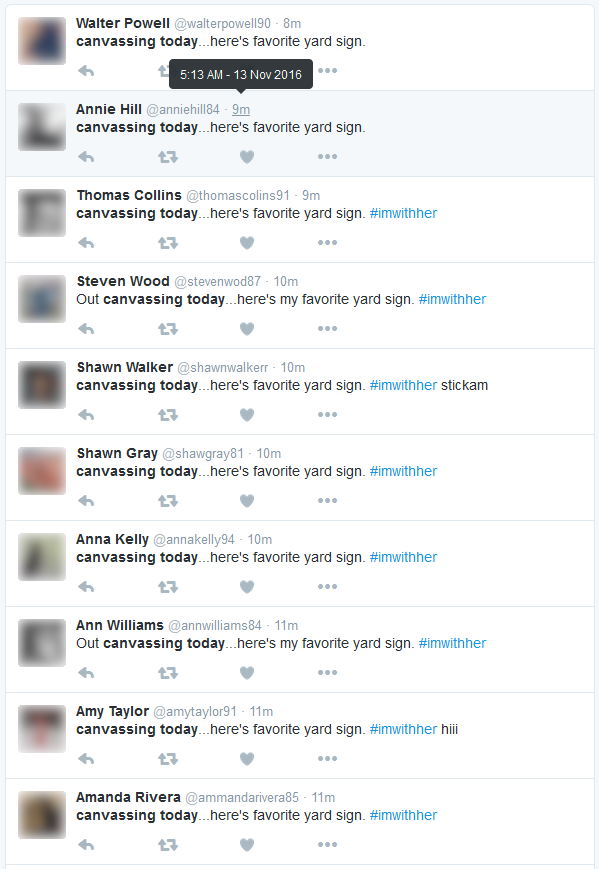
Twitter bots posting similar messages five days after the 2016 United States elections

The dead Internet theory (Note: also referred to as the dead Internet or as the dead Internet conspiracy theory. Sometimes abbreviated DIT.) is a concept that asserts that the Internet consists primarily of bot activity and automated content manipulated by algorithmic curation. Originally conceived as a conspiracy theory that the phenomenon is a coordinated effort to control the population and reduce genuine human interaction, the concept is also employed colloquially to describe the impacts of generative AI and emphasize only the core observations without speculating on the driving forces. (Note: Attributed to multiple sources:)

Supporters of the full theory claim that social bots were deliberately created to manipulate algorithms and enhance search results to influence consumers. Some proponents also accuse government agencies of using bots to shape public perception and opinions. The dead Internet theory gained renewed interest following the AI boom that began in the 2020s, with large language model (LLM) chatbots and text-to-image models emerging as technologies that could theoretically drown out human-authored content on the web. In the time since, social media sites have seen a measured increase in bot activity, such as algorithmic feeds displaying low-quality AI slop at the expense of user-generated content.

Commentators have linked certain aspects of the dead Internet theory to this rise in generative content across social media. (Note: Attributed to multiple sources:) Sources see the theory as having some amount of truth behind it, or as offering a potentially realistic prediction of the Internet's future. (Note: Attributed to multiple sources:) One source uses the term "Dead Internet" to describe spaces online that host generative content, explicitly dropping the word "theory". Within the academic literature, a "leaner" version of the theory has been discussed that focuses on core principles, and explicitly strips the conspiratorial elements.

== Origins and spread ==
Academic literature often struggles to document online subcultures and conspiracy theories, making the origins of the dead Internet theory difficult to precisely identify. The first post on the dead Internet theory is thought to have originated on the image board Wizardchan. In 2021, a post titled "Dead Internet Theory: Most Of The Internet Is Fake" was published onto the forum Agora Road's Macintosh Cafe esoteric board by a user named "IlluminatiPirate", claiming to be building on previous posts from the same board and from Wizardchan, and marking the term's spread beyond these initial imageboards. The conspiracy theory spread into online culture through widespread coverage on platforms such as YouTube, Reddit, and Twitter, where it was amplified by online communities and content creators. It gained more mainstream attention with a September 2021 article in The Atlantic titled Maybe You Missed It, but the Internet 'Died' Five Years Ago. This article has been widely cited by other articles on the topic.

In 2023, the dead Internet theory entered academic literature when a book published by the CRC Press included a definition of the dead Internet theory in its glossary, and in 2024, when an opinion piece titled "Artificial influencers and the dead internet theory" was published in the Curmudgeon Corner of AI & Society. The glossary definition discussed the full theory, while the opinion piece did not, focusing instead on AI-generated content and AI-driven Interactions. These two sources have been cited by other academic articles that discuss the topic. In 2026, a publication in Computer built upon the AI & Society article by distinguishing between a "Leaner" version of the dead Internet theory, centered on the core evidence, and the "conspiracy-laden" full version.

The recent growth of interest in the dead Internet theory has been linked to increasing public awareness of bots, algorithmic content distribution, and advances in artificial intelligence. With the increase in public awareness, a 2026 article identified that the dead Internet theory has been used colloquially to refer to the assumption that bots are creating the majority of online content. The effect of increasing AI content on the internet, caused by bot activity, has been likened to the increase in entropy as driven by the Second Law of Thermodynamics.

== Claims ==
A broken link usually leads to an error message. These broken links over time contribute to link rot.

The dead Internet theory has two main components: that organic human activity on the web has been displaced by bots and algorithmically curated search results, and that state actors are doing this in a coordinated effort to manipulate the human population. The first part of the theory is described as the main argument, and the second part is where the conspiracy portion begins. This first part, that bots create much of the content on the Internet and perhaps contribute more than organic human content, has been a concern for a while, with the original post by "IlluminatiPirate" citing the 2018 article "How Much of the Internet Is Fake? Turns Out, a Lot of It, Actually" in New York magazine. The dead Internet theory goes on to include that search engines are censoring the Web by filtering content that is not desirable by limiting what is indexed and presented in search results. This problem is exacerbated by the phenomenon known as link rot, which is caused when content at a website becomes unavailable, and all links to it on other sites break.

The second half of the dead Internet theory builds on this observable phenomenon by suggesting that this is part of a conspiracy—that the U.S. government, corporations, or other actors are intentionally limiting users to curated, and potentially artificial, AI-generated content to manipulate the human population for a variety of reasons. In the original post, the idea that bots have displaced human content is described as the "setup", with the "thesis" of the theory itself focusing on the United States government being responsible for this, stating:

The U.S. government is engaging in an artificial intelligence-powered gaslighting of the entire world population.

=== "Weak" and "Strong" versions ===
A 2025 chapter in the book Market-Oriented Disinformation Research described the theory as having a "weak" and "strong" version. The "weak" version of the theory asserts that there is a group of elites using bots to shape public discourse, while the "strong" version of the theory asserts that society itself collapsed because of some catastrophic event, and some entity (perhaps aliens or highly advanced artificial intelligence) is keeping people connected to the internet to disguise this reality.

=== "Leaner" dead Internet theory ===
In a 2026 article, Hal Berghel discussed what he called a "leaner" dead Internet theory, "stripped of paranoia, prejudice, politics and polemic." In this discussion, Berghel points to the 2024 publication in AI & Society by Yoshija Walter, and lists algorithmically generated content, generative AI byproducts, the difficulty for some people to distinguish between those and human-generated content, and the resulting mistrust and misinformation as the core of the dead Internet theory. Berghel laments that conspiracy theorists take these phenomena and make implausible claims, while arguing that its core criticisms should not be dismissed.

=== Evidence ===
==== Bot traffic and large language models ====
Original GPT model

In 2016, the security firm Imperva released a report on bot traffic after examining over 16.7 billion visits to 100,000 randomly selected domains, and found that automated programs were responsible for 52% of web traffic. This report has been used as evidence in reports on the dead Internet theory. Imperva's report for 2023 found that 49.6% of Internet traffic was automated, a 2% rise from 2022, which was partly attributed to artificial intelligence models scraping the web for training content. A 2023 policy paper from the Institutul Diplomatic Român cited this increase in bot traffic as the basis for the dead Internet theory. Fortune reported that as of 2026 more than half of all website requests were generated by bots.

Generative pre-trained transformers (GPTs) are a class of large language models (LLMs) that employ artificial neural networks to produce human-like content. The first of these to be well known was developed by OpenAI. These models have created significant controversy. For example, Timothy Shoup of the Copenhagen Institute for Futures Studies said in 2022, "in the scenario where GPT-3 'gets loose', the Internet would be completely unrecognizable". He predicted that in such a scenario, 99% to 99.9% of content online might be AI-generated by 2025 to 2030. These predictions have been used as evidence for the dead Internet theory.

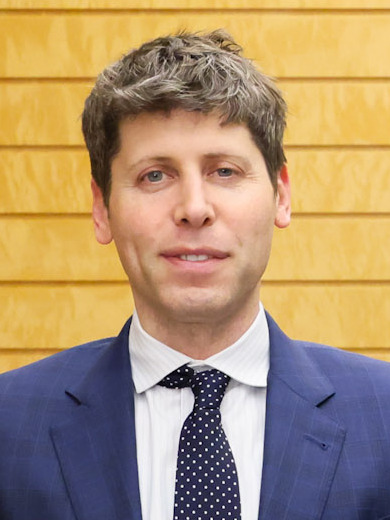
OpenAI CEO Sam Altman

The late 2022 release of ChatGPT, an AI chatbot, by OpenAI to the general public led journalists to call the dead Internet theory potentially more realistic than before. Before ChatGPT's release, the dead Internet theory mostly emphasized government organizations, corporations, and tech-literate individuals. ChatGPT gives the average Internet user access to large language models. This technology caused concern that the Internet would become filled with content created through the use of AI that would drown out organic human content. In September 2025, OpenAI CEO Sam Altman posted on Twitter (by then called X), bringing attention to the dead Internet theory. He stated that:

I never took the dead internet theory that seriously but it seems like there are really a lot of LLM-run twitter accounts now.

This post went viral and led to discussion about the impact of generative AI on society at large, including online experiences, human language, and education.

According to CloudFlare Radar, around 64% of internet traffic is bot traffic.

==== Search engines ====
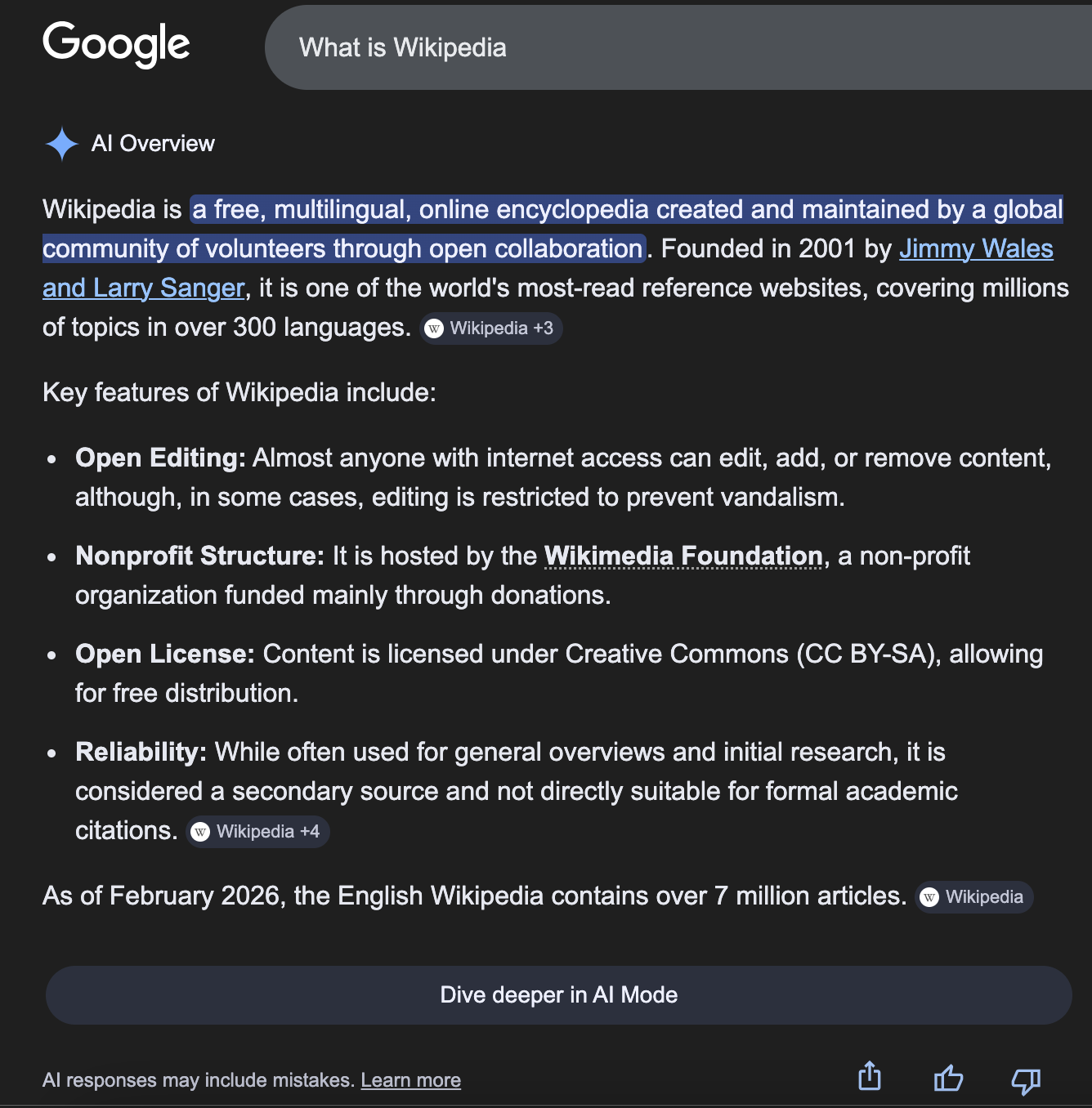
AI Overviews, an example of AI use on search engines

Proponents of the dead Internet theory argue that Google and other search engines are censoring the Web by filtering content that is not desirable by limiting what is indexed and presented in search results. The belief is that while Google may suggest that there are millions of search results for a query, the results available to a user do not reflect that. This problem is exacerbated by the phenomenon known as link rot, which is caused when content at a website becomes unavailable. All links to it on other sites break. This has led to the theory that Google is a Potemkin village, and the searchable Web is much smaller than we are led to believe. Proponents expand this to suggest it is an intentional effort to limit the content available to users.

In 2024, Google reported that its search results were being inundated with websites that "feel like they were created for search engines instead of people". In correspondence with Gizmodo, a Google spokesperson acknowledged the role of generative AI in the rapid proliferation of such content and that it could displace more valuable human-made alternatives. Bots using LLMs are anticipated to increase the amount of spam, and run the risk of creating a situation where bots interacting with each other create "self-replicating prompts" that result in loops only human users could disrupt. In an article in AI & Society, Henrique Marcos discusses the possibility of LLMs impacting linguistic communities as they become more widespread in a scenario like the dead Internet theory.

==== Social media ====
In 2020, several Twitter accounts started posting tweets starting with the phrase "I hate texting" followed by an alternative activity, such as "i hate texting i just want to hold ur hand", or "i hate texting just come live with me". These posts received tens of thousands of likes, many of which are suspected to be from bot accounts. Proponents of the dead Internet theory have used these accounts as an example.

An image posted on many subreddits as protest during the blackout

In the past, the Reddit website allowed free access to its API and data, which allowed users to employ third-party moderation apps and train AI in human interaction. In 2023, the company moved to charge for access to its user dataset. Companies training AI are expected to continue to use this data to train future AI.

As LLMs such as ChatGPT become available to the general public, they are increasingly being employed on Reddit by users and bot accounts. Professor Toby Walsh, a computer scientist at the University of New South Wales, said in an interview with Business Insider that training the next generation of AI on content created by previous generations could cause the content to suffer. University of South Florida professor John Licato compared this situation of AI-generated web content flooding Reddit to the dead Internet theory.

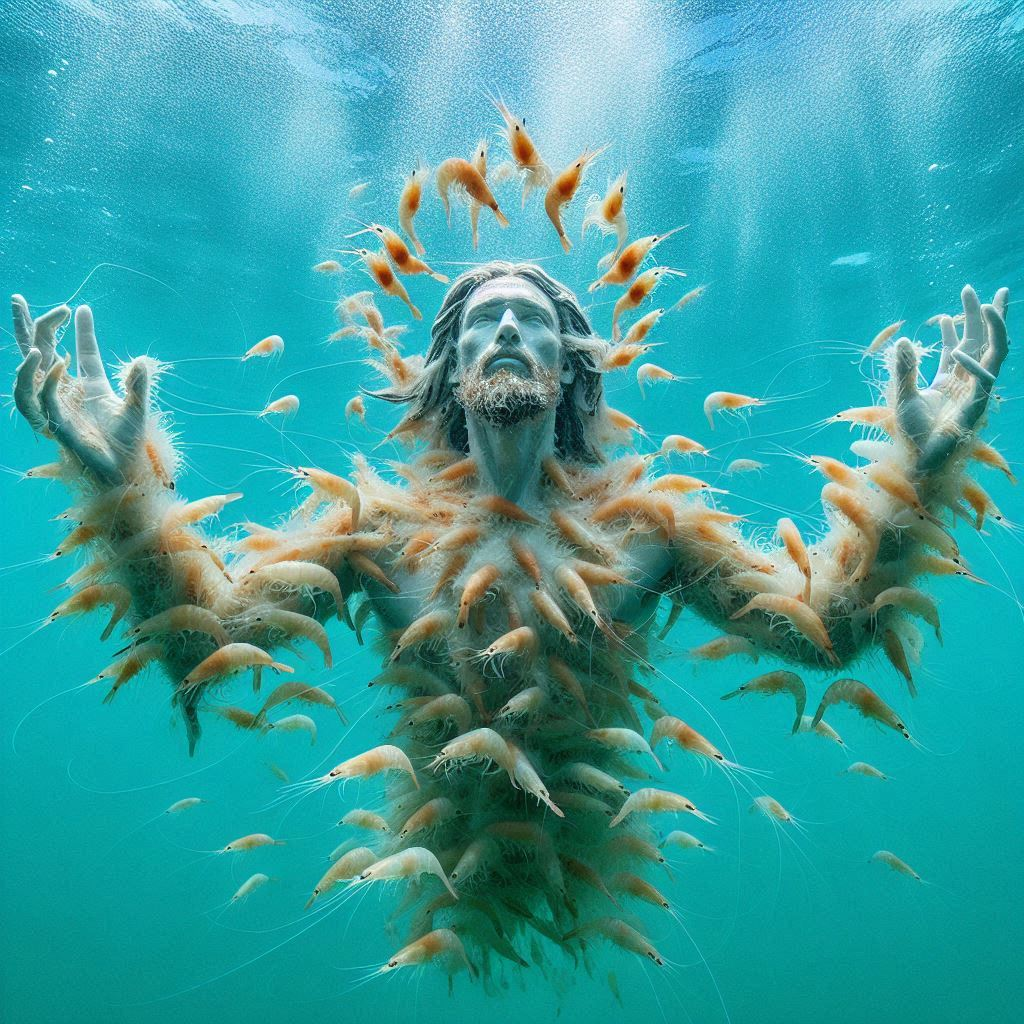
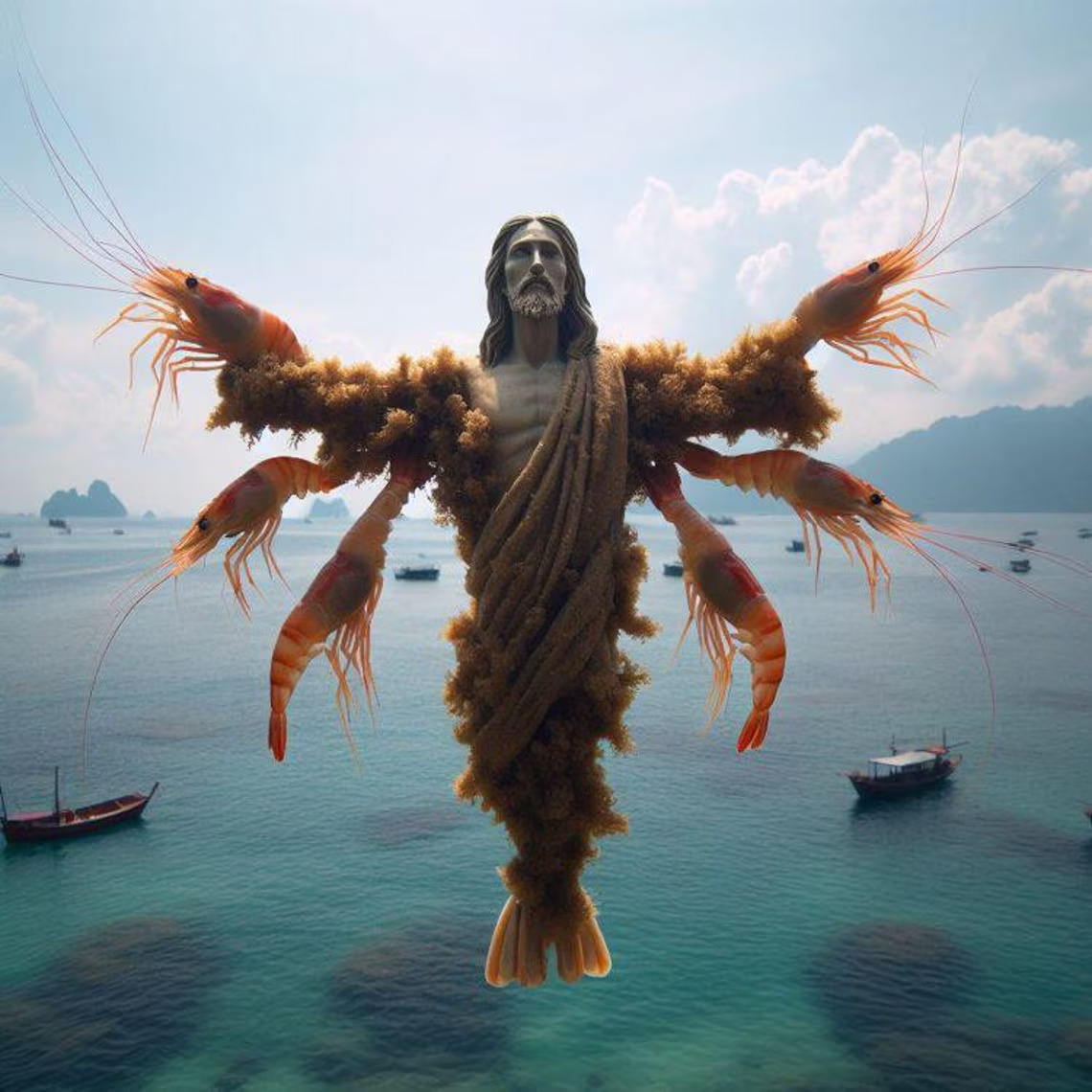
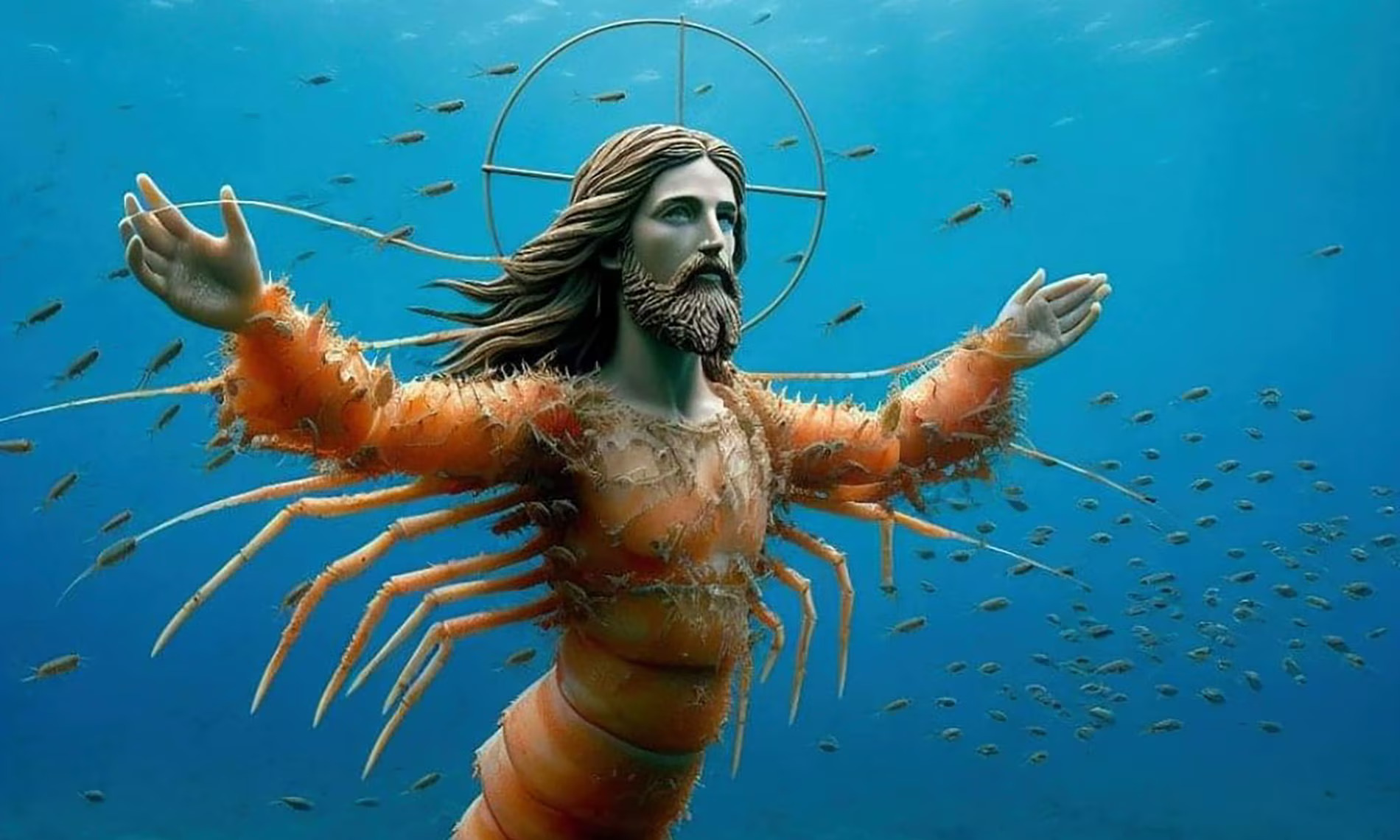
The multitude of AI-generated images of a "Shrimp Jesus" is a commonly used example of "AI slop".

In 2024, AI-generated images on Facebook, referred to as "AI slop", began going viral. Subjects of these AI-generated images included flight attendants, black children next to artwork they supposedly created, and various iterations of "Shrimp Jesus", depictions of Christ "meshed in various forms" with shrimp. Many of these posts had hundreds or even thousands of comments saying "Amen". The images were cited as an example of the Internet of the time having begun to feel "dead". Sommerer discussed Shrimp Jesus in detail within his article as a symbol to represent the shift in the Internet, specifically stating:

Just as Jesus was supposedly the messenger for God, Shrimp Jesus is the messenger for the fatal system [we've] maneuvered ourselves into. Decoupled, proliferated, and in a state of exponential metastasis.

— Thomas Sommerer

Facebook includes an option to provide AI-generated responses to group posts. Such responses appear if a user explicitly tags @MetaAI in a post, or if the post includes a question and no other users have responded to it within an hour. In January 2025, interest renewed in the theory following statements from Meta on their plans to introduce new AI-powered autonomous accounts. Connor Hayes, vice-president of product for generative AI at Meta stated, "We expect these AIs to actually, over time, exist on our platforms, kind of in the same way that accounts do ... They'll have bios and profile pictures and be able to generate and share content powered by AI on the platform." These accounts were quickly removed.

SocialAI, an app created on September 18, 2024, by Michael Sayman, was designed to chat with only AI bots without human interaction. An article on the Ars Technica website linked SocialAI to the dead Internet theory.

On June 23, 2025, Alexis Ohanian, one of the Reddit co-founders, said he thought he "long subscribed to the dead Internet theory" ever since AI has started being able to pass the Turing test, and on October 29, 2025 at TechCrunch Disrupt, Alexis reportedly told Kevin Rose, one of the original founders of Digg (a social media website originally created in 2004), "the dead internet theory is real", whilst Kevin said that he wanted to use zero-knowledge proofs to make a platform full of trusted users. On January 14, 2026, Digg was relaunched in open beta by Alexis Ohanian and Kevin Rose, but was closed 2 months later on March 14 due to an "unprecedented bot problem" among other issues, and on May 11, it was rebooted again as an AI news aggregator taking from X (formerly called Twitter). Digg said on their homepage, that they are doing this because of the very bot problem that shut them down in the first place.

==== Video platforms ====
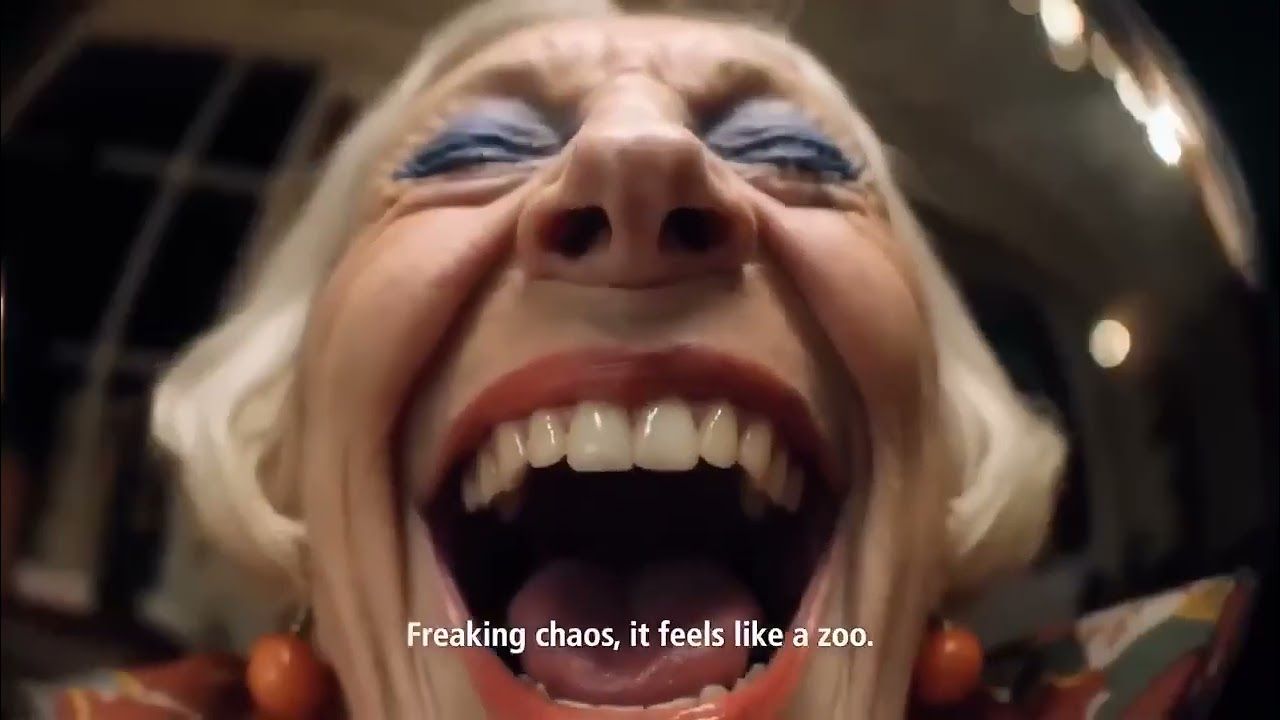
A still frame from It's the Most Terrible Time of the Year, a McDonald's advertisement generated by AI. After backlash, McDonald's disabled the comments on YouTube, and later removed the video.

YouTube is susceptible to fake views generated by computers, not human users, and fake views were so prevalent that some engineers were concerned YouTube's algorithm for detecting them would begin to treat the fake views as default and start misclassifying real ones. YouTube engineers coined the term "the Inversion" to describe this phenomenon. YouTube bots and the fear of "the Inversion" were cited as support for the dead Internet theory in a thread on the Internet forum Melonland.

In 2024, TikTok began discussing offering virtual influencers to advertising agencies. In a 2024 article in Fast Company, journalist Michael Grothaus linked this and other AI-generated content on social media to the dead Internet theory. In this article, he referred to the content as "AI slime".

== Expert view ==
Research has shown that automated bot accounts make up a significant portion of internet traffic, though experts emphasize that this does not prove a coordinated effort to replace human activity online. Critics argue that the theory is based largely on unverified observation, such as perceived declines in content quality or repetitive online interactions, rather than verifiable data. Researchers also note that many forms of bot activity, such as spam filtering, Denial-of-service attacks, and web scraping, serve specific functions, sometimes maliciously, but do not indicate in any way that human participation on the internet is being replaced. Researchers have also compared the dead Internet theory to other internet-related conspiracy theories and note that these theories often stretch current trends, like artificial intelligence and increased bot activity, into speculative claims without using concrete evidence. Research discussing the dead Internet theory has focused on several issues identified in the claims of the theory without discussing the speculative aspects, and colloquially researchers and the public have used it to refer to these issues without the conspiracy aspects.

Caroline Busta, founder of the media platform New Models, was quoted in a 2021 article in The Atlantic calling the conspiratorial aspect of the dead Internet theory a "paranoid fantasy", despite acknowledging that there are legitimate criticisms involving bot traffic and the integrity of the Internet, and agreeing with the "overarching idea". A 2021 Ouest-France article, which heavily referenced the 2021 article in The Atlantic, went on to compare the dead Internet theory to flat Earth and COVID-19 conspiracy theories. The article stated that even though bots do produce online content, the dead Internet theory is still not realistic. In 2023 in The New Atlantis, Robert Mariani called the theory a mix between a genuine conspiracy theory and a creepypasta. A 2023 book published by CRC Press discussed the dead Internet theory, specifically mentioning Google censoring the web. The book included an entry for the term in its glossary defining it:

The Dead Internet Theory is a conspiracy theory that suggests the Internet has died and that much of the content we see online is now artificially generated by AI to manipulate the world population. The theory raises concerns about the impact of AI on propaganda, art, and journalism.

A 2024 IFLScience article stated:

Like all good conspiracy theories, the Dead Internet Theory takes a kernel of truth or agreed sentiment (that the internet is getting worse, and that bot activity is increasing) and twists it into something it isn't.

— James Felton

In 2024, "dead Internet theory" was sometimes used to refer to the observable increase in content generated via large language models (LLMs) such as ChatGPT appearing in popular Internet spaces without mention of the full theory. In a 2024 opinion column in AI & Society's "Curmudgeon Corner", Yoshija Walter stated that the once speculative theory is now observable with the introduction of AI generated content. In a 2025 article by Thomas Sommerer, this portion of the dead Internet theory is explored, with Sommerer citing Walter and calling the displacement of human generated content with artificial content "an inevitable event". Sommerer states the dead Internet theory is not scientific in nature, but reflects the public perception of the Internet.

Another article in the Journal of Cancer Education discussed the impact of the perception of the dead Internet theory in online cancer support forums, specifically focusing on the psychological impact on patients who find that support is coming from an LLM rather than a genuine human. The article cited both Walter and the CRC Press book when defining the dead internet theory, but did not mention the conspiracy aspect. The article also discussed potential problems in training data for LLMs that could emerge from using AI-generated content to train the LLMs. In a 2025 paper, Roland Leikauf described the dead Internet theory as "pseudoscientific" while questioning if new AI tools would justify our fear that the theory might become reality. Leikauf cites Walter's 2024 publication for his definition of the dead Internet theory. In a chapter of the 2025 book Market-Oriented Disinformation Research, it states:

What makes the Dead Internet a nameworthy conspiracy is that even though it is rooted in selective truths that are exaggerated or even taken to their logical extremes, it also draws attention to a legitimate problem.

— Carlos Diaz Ruiz

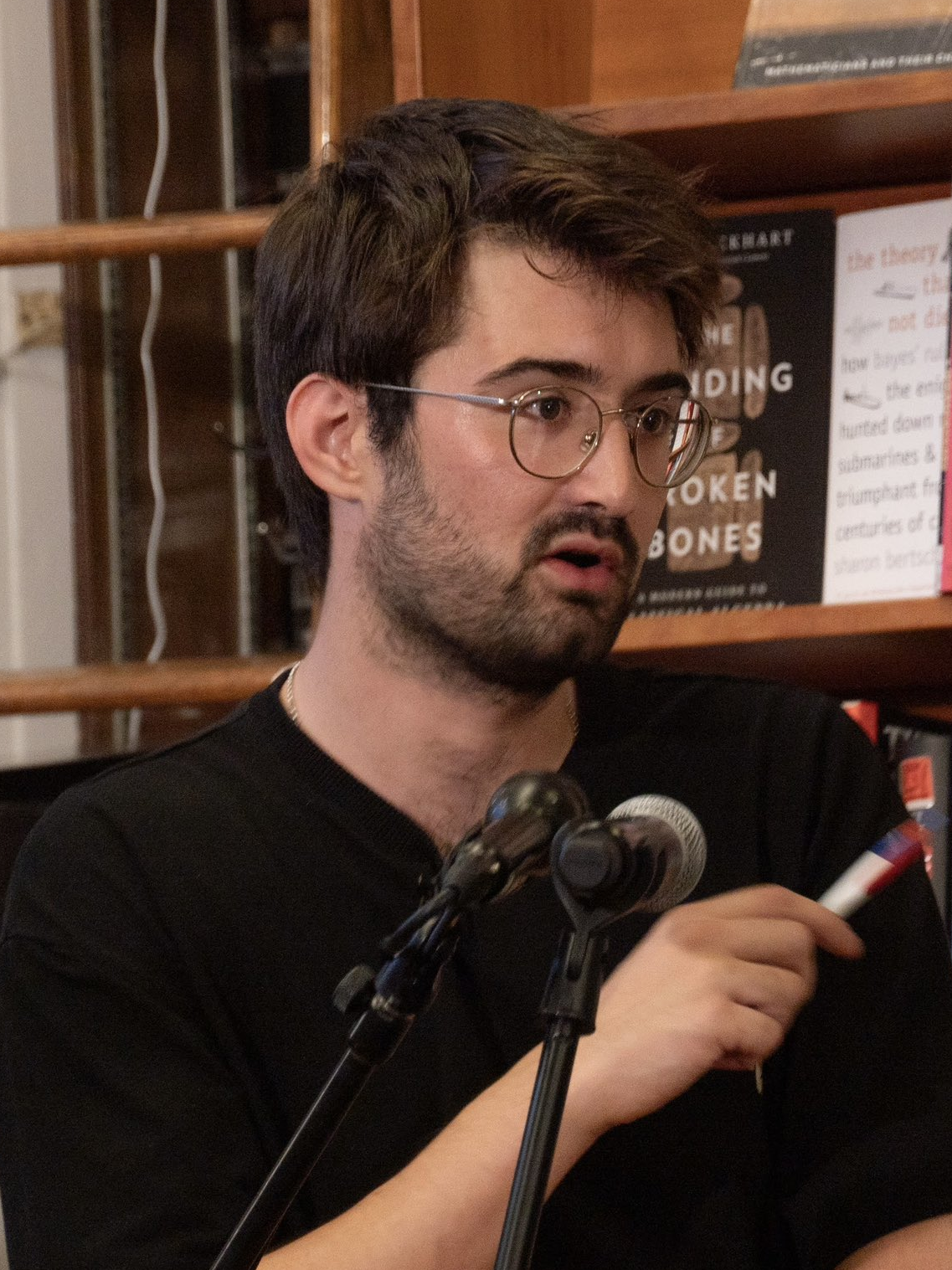
Photograph of Adam Aleksic in 2025

In a 2025 interview with Time, linguist Adam Aleksic stated that the dead Internet theory "used to be a lunatic fringe conspiracy theory, but it's looking a lot more real".

In a 2026 paper published in Computer, Hal Berghel discusses a "leaner" version of the theory, without the conspiratorial elements, focusing on the core claims, specifically referencing the 2024 paper by Yoshija Walter. In this paper, he states:

We must admit that some of the core principles of the DIT are convergent with our technical and historical experience. Unfortunately, conspiracy theorists augment these very plausible observations with their own mix of biases and agendas, leading to implausibility and absurdity, which in turn leads to rejection. But it is a mistake of the first order to dismiss the core criticisms unequivocally.

— Hal Berghel

== In popular culture ==
The dead Internet theory has been discussed among users of the social media platform X (formerly known as Twitter). Users have noted that bot activity has affected their experience. Numerous YouTube channels and online communities, including the Linus Tech Tips forums and the Joe Rogan subreddit, have covered the dead Internet theory, bringing the idea into mainstream discourse. The DIT is often used colloquially to refer to the issue surrounding bots online in popular culture, without reference to the broader conspiracy theory.

== See also ==
- Algorithmic radicalization – Radicalization via social media algorithms
- Brain rot – Slang for poor-quality digital content
- Clanker – Pejorative for robots and AI software
- Echo chamber (media) – Situation that reinforces beliefs by repetition inside a closed system
- Enshittification – Decline in online platform quality
- Eternal September – Internet jargon
- Filter bubble – Intellectual isolation through internet algorithms
- Moltbook – Social network exclusively for AI agents
- Slopaganda – AI-generated content used for political manipulation
- Closed platform, also known as Walled garden (technology) – System where a single company controls an entire ecosystem
