= Clanker =

Pejorative for robots and AI software

Clanker is a slang term for robots and artificial intelligence (AI) software. The term has been used in Star Wars media, first appearing in the 2005 video game Star Wars: Republic Commando. The term became widely used in 2025 to express hatred or distaste for various kinds of intelligent computer systems, ranging from delivery robots to large language models. This trend has been attributed to anxiety around the negative societal effects of AI.

== In science fiction ==
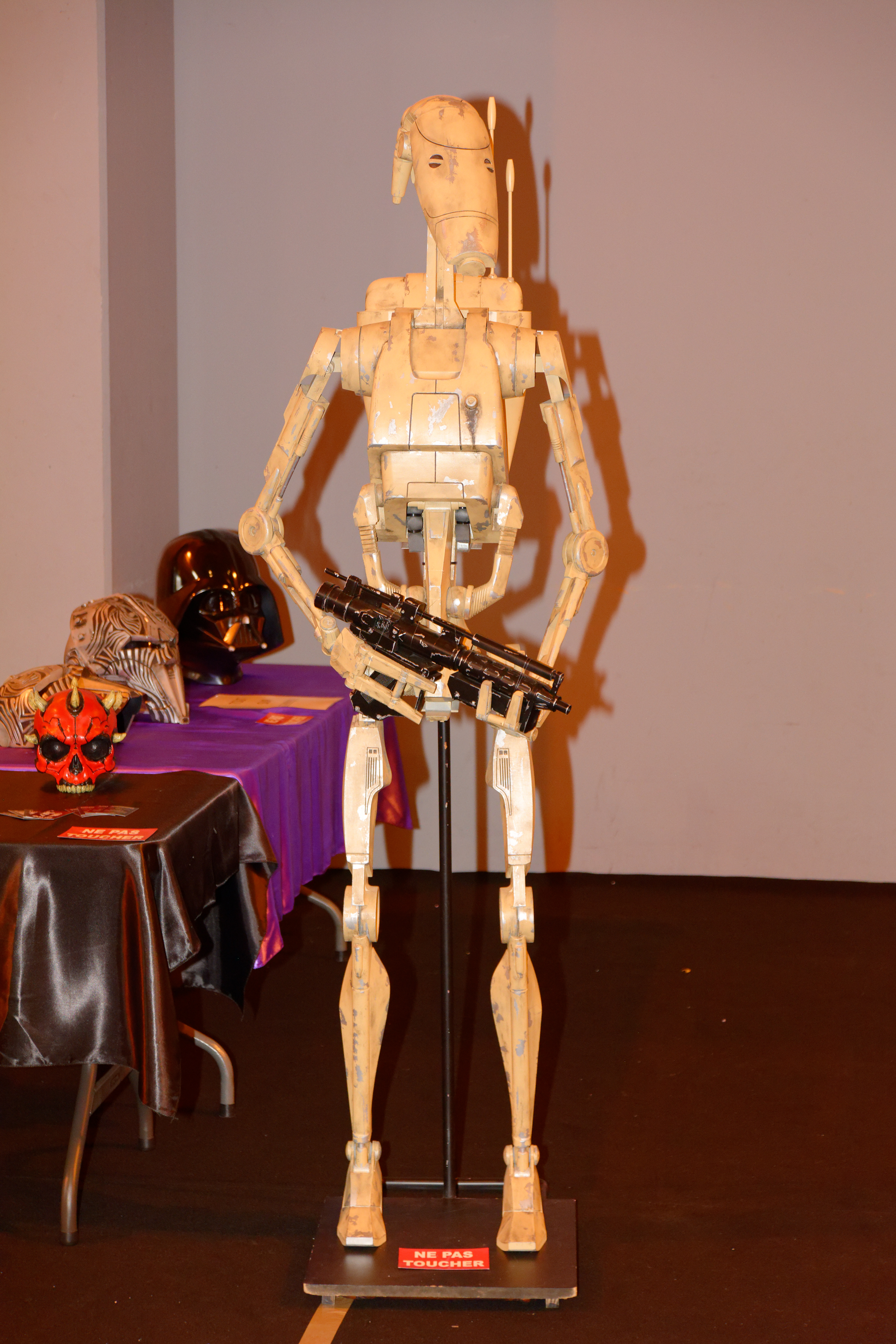
"Clanker" is used in the Star Wars franchise to refer to battle droids.

The term has been previously used in science fiction literature, first appearing in a 1958 article by William Tenn in which he uses it to describe robots from science fiction films like Metropolis. The Star Wars franchise began using the term as a slur against droids in the 2005 video game Star Wars: Republic Commando before being prominently used in the animated series Star Wars: The Clone Wars, which follows a galaxy-wide war between the Galactic Republic's clone troopers and the Confederacy of Independent Systems' battle droids.

In Star Wars media, robots—more commonly known as droids—are routinely depicted as the subjects of discrimination. For example, in the original Star Wars film, C-3PO and R2-D2 are abducted by Jawas and sold to the family of Luke Skywalker. When visiting a cantina in Mos Eisley, both droids are refused service by the bartender, who remarks that "We don't serve their kind." In Star Wars lore, the term clanker had entered use by the time of the franchise's High Republic Era and became prominent during the Clone Wars, in which clone troopers regularly use the phrase against battle droids.

== AI backlash ==
The growing popularity of the term clanker reflects an increase in direct contact between people and AI systems. On sidewalks, delivery robots have been criticized for impeding mobility and causing safety issues, especially those of pedestrians and cyclists.

The term is also a reaction to AI advocacy from industrialists like Elon Musk and Sam Altman, who have championed the integration of AI into nearly every aspect of modern life. This includes efforts by major companies and startups alike, such as Amazon's development of humanoid robots to replace human workers in service industries. Such initiatives have further fueled public skepticism, reinforcing the association of clanker with unease over automation and the displacement of human roles. A global survey conducted by the research firm Gartner in December 2023 found that 64% of customers would prefer companies to avoid using AI in customer service, with another 53% stating they would consider switching to a different company if they discovered AI was handling their service interactions. A 2026 study done at Elon University states that "83% of U.S. adults expect AI to eliminate more jobs than it creates", adding on to the fear. Another report by Ernst & Young, published in July 2025, found that 42% of employees across Europe are worried that the use of AI in the workplace may threaten their employment. Some of the backlash stems from concerns about the resource consumption of AI systems, their frequent reliance on copyrighted material without consent, questions about the intentions of the corporations behind them, and concerns about the potential cognitive effects of relying heavily on AI.

In June 2025 United States Senator Ruben Gallego tweeted that his "new bill makes sure you don't have to talk to a clanker if you don't want to", referring to proposed legislation that would require call centers to disclose their use of automated customer service agents to callers in the United States and offer the option to switch to a human representative.

== Analysis ==
Linguist Adam Aleksic has described clanker as an evolution of racial slurs that anthropomorphize robotic systems. Internet memes incorporating the term often reference historical discrimination against marginalized groups such as African Americans. Based on the work of linguist Geoffrey Nunberg, American news website Axios has argued that clanker is merely a derogatory word, rather than a slur, because it does not perpetuate social inequities. NPR has noted the irony that the word robot was coined by Karel Čapek for his 1920 science-fiction play R.U.R. as a similar criticism of industrialization forcing workers to become devoid of their humanity. Aleksic has observed that robot can be further traced to the Proto-Slavic noun *orbъ, which means 'slave'.

While other science fiction media include pejoratives for androids and robots, such as skinjob and toaster from the Blade Runner and Battlestar Galactica franchises, respectively, clanker is believed to have gained popularity because its usage is intuitive and flexible. Whereas AI slop describes low-quality output from artificial intelligence, clanker belittles the underlying computer systems.

== See also ==
- AI slop – Low-quality AI-generated digital content
- AI takeover – Artificial intelligence scenario
- Butlerian Jihad – Destruction of "thinking machines" in the Dune franchise
- Cultural impact of Star Wars – Star Wars saga in popular culture
- Dead Internet theory – Concept involving online bot activity
- Discrimination against robots
- Enshittification – Decline in online platform quality
- Ethics of artificial intelligence
- Luddite – 19th-century English anti-automation group
- Technological singularity – Hypothetical event
- Technophobia – Fear or discomfort with technology
- These aren't the droids you're looking for – Quote from the film Star Wars
- Violence against robots
