= Violence against robots =

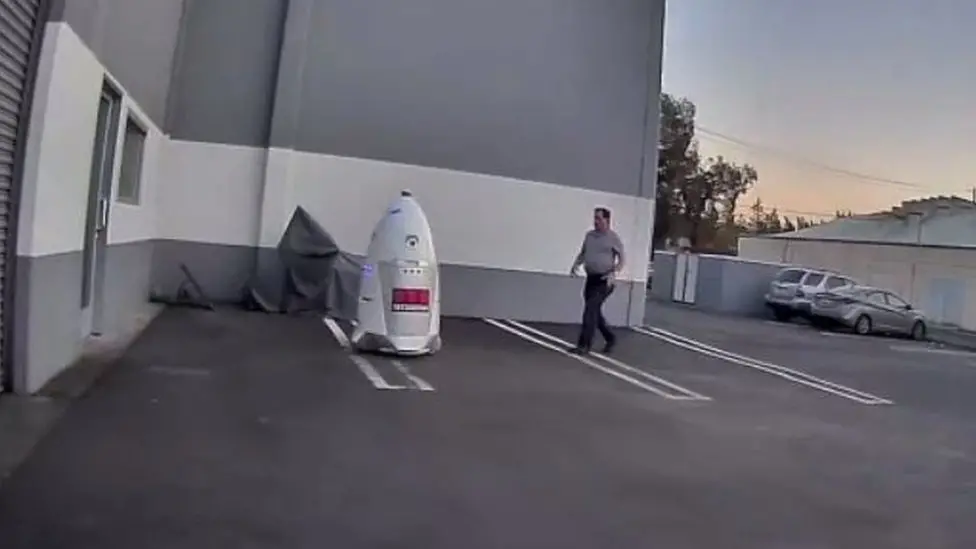
An image from CCTV footage of a 41-year-old drunk man shortly before attacking a Knightscope robot.

Methods of human violence against robots include physically damaging the robot, tricking or confusing it, or sabotaging its environmental awareness. These attacks may be motivated by personal emotions, practical considerations, or political concerns. Several incidents of violence against robots have been reported in news media, including attacks against HitchBOT, Knightscope K5 security robots, and self-driving cars.

Some companies, such as Starship Technologies, have attempted to discourage violence by creating robots that react as if in distress when abused. However, researchers disagree on the ethics of using this strategy.

== Definition ==
Brščić et al. define violence against robots as "persistent offensive action, either verbal or non-verbal, or physical violence that violates the robot's role or its human-like or animal-like nature".

== Types of attack ==
Types of attacks include disabling the robot, impairing its sensors, or verbally attacking it in ways that cause humans to believe that the robot has experienced humiliation or a weakened social status (e.g., defacement). Another type of attack involves deliberately confusing the robot, such as when a food delivery robot was led into dangerous traffic. The robot can also be hacked, causing it to perform unexpected actions. An attack against a robot may be either an act of vandalism against the organization that owns it or an attack on the robot as if it were an individual.

== History ==
There have been cases of factory workers damaging autonomous machines since at least the 19th century, including the Luddites in England, a movement of textile workers who opposed automation in their factories. They often destroyed sewing and cropping machines in organized raids.

== Cases ==
=== Attacks on autonomous bots ===
A widely published attack against the hitchhiker robot hitchBOT occurred in Philadelphia in 2015, where attackers stripped, dismembered, and decapitated it. Similar attacks have taken place against Knightscope K5 security robots. In December 2017, San Francisco's Society for the Prevention of Cruelty to Animals removed its Knightscope surveillance robot from the streets after nearby homeless people accused it of harassment, and reportedly "put a tarp over it, knocked it over and put barbecue sauce on all the sensors".

=== Attacks on autonomous cars ===
At least two dozen attacks on driverless cars occurred in Chandler, Arizona over two years after Waymo began testing its vehicles in the city in 2017. People threw rocks at them, tried to run them off the road, and threatened passengers. Human-on-robot attacks have occurred in San Francisco, with residents slapping and shouting at driverless vehicles in 2018.

In late 2025, a group vandalized a Waymo in Los Angeles shortly after one of the company's driverless vehicles reportedly killed a bodega cat in San Francisco. Children have been observed standing in front of robots to obstruct them, verbally abusing and physically punching or kicking them, despite pleas from the robots to stop.

== Mitigation ==
The Starship Technologies food-delivery robots make a "screeching" sound when they are picked up, deterring theft or vandalism. Researchers have proposed designing the robots to appear as if they are experiencing pain to stop people from attacking them.

Marieke Wieringa has warned against the misuse of this strategy, which may be used to emotionally manipulate consumers, such as creating virtual pets that display distress when not fed, but must be paid to be fed.

== See also ==
- Discrimination against robots
