= Peter Steinberger (programmer) =

Austrian computer programmer (born 1986)

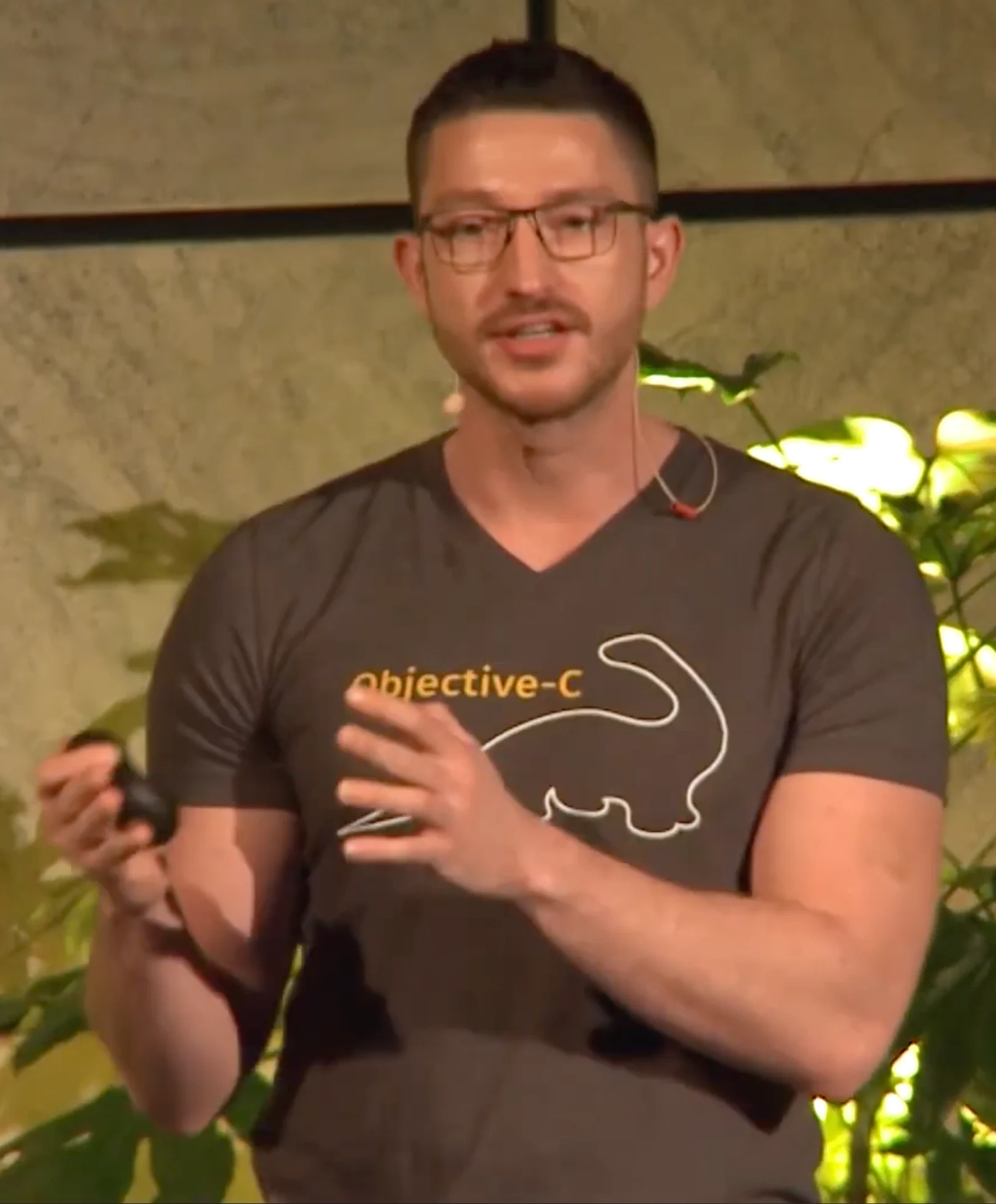
- Steinberger at dotSwift 2018
- Born: May 22, 1986 (age 40); Austria
- Occupation: Computer programmer
- Employer: OpenAI
- Known for: PSPDFKit; OpenClaw

Peter Steinberger (born 1986) is an Austrian computer programmer and entrepreneur. He is known as the creator of OpenClaw, an open-source artificial intelligence agent, and as the founder and former CEO of PSPDFKit.

== Career ==
During his studies in Vienna University of Technology, he established himself as an early adopter of Apple's iOS platform. In 2010, Steinberger founded PSPDFKit, which provides document processing and PDF frameworks for mobile and web applications. Others who helped create PSPDFkit as a company include Jonathan Rhyne and Martin Schürrer. Steinberger eventually stepped down from his role and exited the company. Following a hiatus from the tech industry, Steinberger shifted his focus to artificial intelligence and "vibe coding", to use large language models to write and execute code.

In November 2025, he released an open-source project initially named Clawdbot (later renamed Moltbot, and finally OpenClaw). OpenClaw is an autonomous AI agent that interacts with users through messaging platforms such as WhatsApp, Telegram, and Discord.

In February 2026, he announced he would be joining OpenAI and rejecting an offer to join Meta.

== Personal life ==
Steinberger is "from a rural area in Austria." In 2026, he said he was moving to the United States, saying that there was too much regulation and "scolding" stifling AI development in Europe.
