= Eternal September =

Internet jargon

Eternal September or the September that never ended was a cultural phenomenon during a period beginning around late 1993 and early 1994, when internet service providers began offering Usenet access to many new users. Before this, the only sudden changes in the volume of new users of Usenet occurred each September, when cohorts of university students from North America would gain access to it for the first time, in sync with the academic calendar.

The flood of new and generally inexperienced Internet users directed to Usenet by commercial ISPs in 1993 and subsequent years swamped the existing culture of those forums and their ability to self-moderate and enforce existing norms. AOL began their Usenet gateway service in March 1994, leading to a constant stream of new users. Hence, from the early Usenet community point of view, the influx of new users that began in September 1993 appeared to be endless.

== History ==
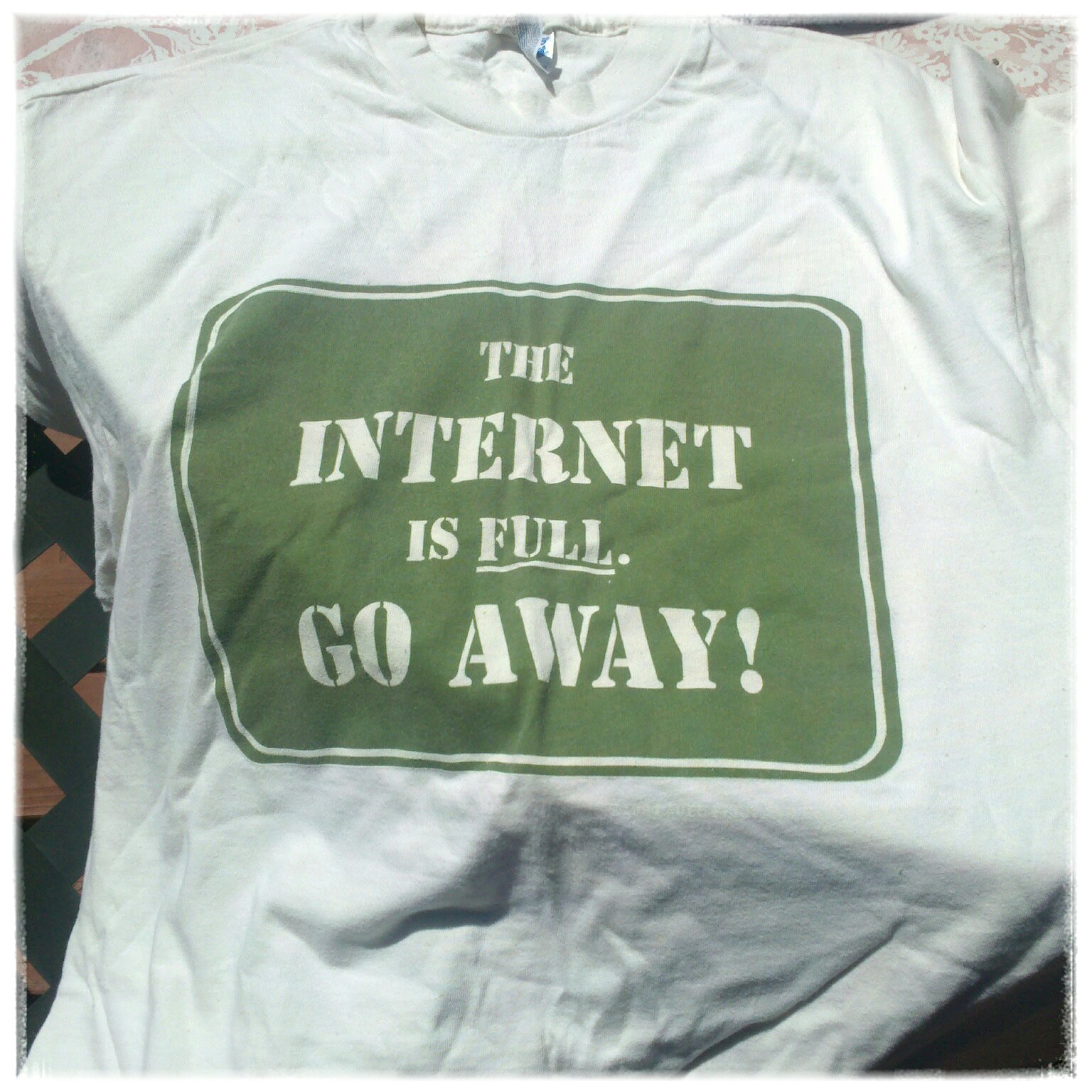
A 1994 t-shirt commemorating Eternal September

During the 1980s and early 1990s, Usenet and the Internet were generally the domain of dedicated computer professionals and hobbyists; new users joined slowly, in small numbers, and learned how to conduct themselves online without annoying the experienced users too much.

The only exception to this was September of every year, when large numbers of first-year university students from North America gained access to the Internet and Usenet through their university campuses. These large groups of new users who had not yet learned online etiquette created a nuisance for the experienced users, who came to dread September every year.

However, each year the tide of new users would eventually abate, as everyone learned to get along and assimilate into existing communities, or found the place not to their liking and quit using it. But once ISPs such as AOL made affordable Internet access widely available for home users (in particular, offering Usenet access as a sign-on service, such as AOL Mail), a continuous influx of new users began, making it feel like it was always "September" to the more experienced users.

The full phrase appears to have progressed over a series of months on two separate alt.folklore newsgroups where a number of threads exist lamenting what they saw as an increase in low-quality posts across various newsgroups. Several members of the newsgroups referenced aspects of the "September" issue, typically in a joking manner.

In a thread on January 8, 1994, Joel Furr cross-posted asking "Is it just me, or has Delphi unleashed a staggering amount of weirdos on the net?", which garnered a reply from Karl Reinsch "Of course it's perpetually September for Delphi users, isn't it?" The day before, Furr had also posted the same message to alt.folklore.urban, where David Fischer responded with a joke call-to-action where he referred to the increasing numbers of Delphi users as the "Never-Ending-September". Fischer also replied to a different thread on January 25, 1994, in alt.folklore.computers saying, "It's moot now. September 1993 will go down in net history as the September that never ended." This quote has been suggested to have been the first reference.

Possibly the first use of the "Eternal September" phrase was a newsgroup post by John William Chambless in February 1994. He posted a rant including some excerpts of low-quality articles he found in one of his newsgroups that day, but titled the post "The Eternal September".

== Legacy ==
A tongue-in-cheek program called sdate emits the current date, formatted using the Eternal September calendar (September X, 1993, where X is an unbounded counter for days since that epoch). This is not the identically named sdate, one of the sixty commands that comes with the First Edition of Unix, that is used to set the system clock. Named with similar humor is one of the free public Usenet servers, Eternal-September.org.

In 2026, software development and collaboration platform GitHub referenced this phenomenon while talking about the negative effects of AI-assisted software development on open-source software maintenance.

== See also ==
- Dead Internet theory
- Enshittification
- July effect
- Sturgeon's law
- Tragedy of the commons
