= Mark Alfano =

American philosopher (born 1983)

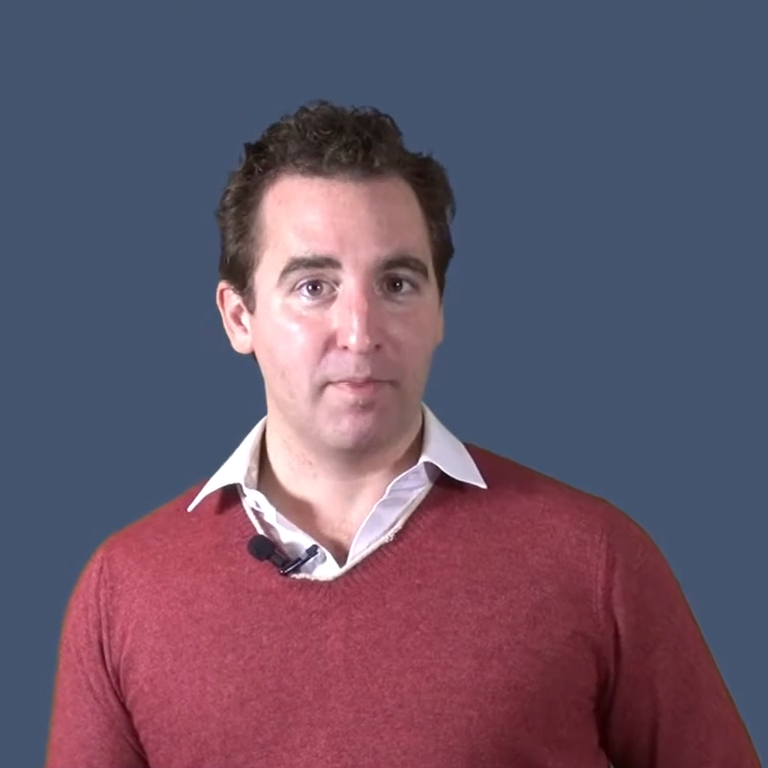
Alfano in 2017

Mark Alfano (born 1983) is an American philosopher and associate professor of Philosophy at Macquarie University. He is the editor of The Moral Psychology of the Emotions, a series of books published by Rowman & Littlefield. Alfano is known for his research on virtue ethics., virtue epistemology, social epistemology, and Friedrich Nietzsche.

== Books ==
- Alfano, Mark (2013). Character as moral fiction. Cambridge: Cambridge University Press. p. 226. ISBN 978-1-139-61265-4. OCLC 827212238.
- Alfano, Mark (2016). Moral psychology: an introduction (1st ed.). Cambridge, UK: Polity. p. 216. ISBN 978-0-7456-7224-3. OCLC 913829564.
- Alfano, Mark (2019). Nietzsche's moral psychology. Cambridge: Cambridge University Press. ISBN 978-1-139-69655-5. OCLC 1119537895.
- Roose, Joshua M. (2022). Masculinity and violent extremism. Michael Flood, Alan Greig, Mark Alfano, Simon Copland (1st ed.). Cham: Palgrave Macmillan. ISBN 978-3-031-10497-8. OCLC 1343197482.
- Current controversies in virtue theory. Mark Alfano (1st ed.). New York. 2015. ISBN 978-1-317-54162-2. OCLC 903489486.
