= AI & Society =

- Discipline: Artificial intelligence
- Language: English
- Edited by: Karamjit S. Gill

Publication details
- History: 1987–present
- Publisher: Springer Science+Business Media
- Frequency: Quarterly
- Impact factor: 3.0 (2022)

Standard abbreviations
- ISO 4: AI Soc.

Indexing
- ISSN: 0951-5666 (print); 1435-5655 (web)
- LCCN: 2002256078
- OCLC no.: 643626991

Links
- Journal homepage; Online access

AI & Society is a quarterly peer-reviewed academic journal published by Springer Science+Business Media. The editor-in-chief is Karamjit S. Gill (University of Brighton). The journal was established in 1987 and covers all aspects of artificial intelligence and its effects on and interaction with society.

== Abstracting and indexing ==
The journal is abstracted and indexed in:

- EBSCO databases
- Ei Compendex
- Emerging Sources Citation Index
- Inspec
- ProQuest databases
- Scopus

According to the Journal Citation Reports, the journal has a 2022 impact factor of 3.0.
