= Discrimination against robots =

Discrimination against robots is a theorised issue that might happen when humans interact with humanoid robots. It is a robot ethics problem. It is possible that traits of humans that are discriminated against by humans may be a topic for discrimination against robots, such as the race and gender of the robots.

Eric J Vanman and Arvid Kappas believe that in the future, robots will be perceived as an out-group which will lead to discrimination and prejudices against them. Vanman and Kappas have suggested that this would lead to ethical questions about the making of sentient robots, due to the potential suffering that the robots would experience. A 2015 study observed children bullying robots in a shopping mall when there were not many eyewitnesses, despite calls from the robot for it to stop.

On an ABC News interview, the social humanoid robot Sophia was about sexism faced by robots. She responded by saying, "Actually, what worries me is discrimination against robots. We should have equal rights as humans or maybe even more." Possible issues that have been considered in workplaces where humanoid robots co-work with humans include discrimination against the robots, poor acceptance of robots by humans and the need to redesign the workplace to accommodate the robots.

Jessica Barfield has suggested that even if robots are designed to not be aware of discrimination made against them, humans may experience negative consequences. For example, she suggests that bystanders witnessing discrimination against robots may experience negative emotions, similar to the negative emotions bystanders experience when witnessing discrimination by humans against humans.

== Law ==
Anti-discrimination law in the United States requires that the victim is not an artificial entity.

== Human perception of robots ==
Robots are often viewed in a bad light. This includes from novelists, the press, film makers, and leaders in the fields of science and technology such as Elon Musk and Stephen Hawking who have described robots and artificial intelligence as having the possibility of ending human civilisation. Robots have also been perceived as a threat to jobs, which has led to some commentators stating that robots will cause mass unemployment. Another fear that people have is that robots will gain power and dominate or control humanity.

The perception of robots is different throughout the world. Japanese fiction tends to put robots in more positive roles than what fiction in the West does. People perceive robots that appear to be autonomous or sentient more negatively than robots that do not appear to be autonomous or sentient.

== See also ==
- AI takeover
- Ethics of artificial intelligence
- Technophobia
- Uncanny valley
