= Timeline of GitHub =

History of the source control web service

This is a timeline of GitHub, a web-based Git or version control repository and Internet hosting service.

== Big picture ==
Time Period	Development summary	More details
2007	Conception, initial launch, and core features	GitHub is founded initially as Logical Awesome in February and the website launches in April. Core parts of GitHub launch during this year, including the company blog, per-project wikis, GitHub Gist, and GitHub Pages.
2009 – June 2013	Continued growth and product releases	GitHub continues to release products including GitHub Enterprise, Redcarpet, and Hubot. Many companies that now regularly use GitHub—including Facebook and Google—join GitHub during this period.
July 2013 – September 2015	Continued growth and product releases; outreach; attacks and censorship against the site; CEO resigns	GitHub continues to launch a series of products and enhancements to existing products. For the desktop, it releases Electron, Atom, and a desktop client. In terms of outreach, it launches the Bug Bounty Program, ChooseALicense.com, GitHub Classroom, GitHub Student Developer Pack, and the GitHub Engineering blog. The GitHub website also experiences multiple attacks as well as censorship from governments. In April 2014, co-founder and CEO Tom Preston-Werner resigns from the company following allegations of harassment.
October 2015 – present	Change in pricing model	GitHub changes its pricing model from a repository-based one to a user-based one; in the process, it introduces unlimited private repositories for all customers.

== Full timeline ==
Year	Month and date	Event type	Details
2005	7 April	Background	The initial version of Git, a version control system with support for data integrity, is released. Git would come to power GitHub.
2006	11 October	Competition	First public Git free hosting platform repo.or.cz is fully launched. This came several weeks after an initial launch focusing only on public mirroring and gitweb services.
2007	19 October	Company	Development of the GitHub platform begins.
2008	29 February	Company	GitHub is founded.
	22 February	Product	GitHub launches its company blog. In the announcement blog post, GitHub notes that per-project wikis have also launched.
	10 April	Product	Tom Preston-Werner, Chris Wanstrath, and PJ Hyett launch the GitHub website after having made it available a few months prior as a beta release.
	18 June	Userbase	Reddit joins GitHub.
	9 July	Userbase	Yahoo! joins GitHub.
	21 July	Product	GitHub launches Gist, a pastebin-style service with versioning.
	5 November	Product	The initial version of Jekyll, a static site generator, is released by GitHub CEO Tom Preston-Werner. Jekyll would come to power GitHub Pages.
	14 December	Userbase	The Sunlight Foundation, an American 501(c)(3) nonpartisan, nonprofit organization that advocates for open government, joins GitHub. By September 2010, the foundation would have 97 software projects hosted on GitHub.
	18 December	Product	GitHub announces GitHub Pages, a way for users to create custom websites.
	[data missing]	Competition	Bitbucket launches
2009	10 January		GitHub wins "best bootstrapped startup" from the Crunchies.
	29 January	Userbase	Twitter joins GitHub.
	24 February	Growth (repository)	GitHub team members announce, in a talk at Yahoo! headquarters, that within the first year of being online, GitHub has accumulated over 46,000 public repositories, 17,000 of which were formed in the previous month alone. At this time, about 6,200 repositories have been forked at least once and 4,600 have been merged.
	1 April	Userbase	Facebook joins GitHub.
	20 April	Product	GitHub completes its transition to use GitHub Flavored Markdown on the site. GitHub Flavored Markdown is a variant of the Markdown markup language.
	5 July	Growth (user)	GitHub reaches 100,000 users.
	27 July	Growth (repository)	Tom Preston-Werner announces that GitHub has grown to host 90,000 unique public repositories, 12,000 having been forked at least once, for a total of 135,000 repositories.
	14 December	Product	The initial commit to the Semantic Versioning repository is made by Tom Preston-Werner.
2010	January	Company	GitHub Inc started to operate GitHub.
	10 March	Product	GitHub introduces Compare View, a feature that allows users to compare commits in a Git repository. In July, GitHub would add support for comparing across repositories.
	1 July		Ruby and JavaScript become the most popular languages on GitHub, with 19% and 17% of the hosted code, respectively.
	24 July	Growth (repository)	GitHub hits 1 million hosted repositories. Of these repositories, 60% are regular repositories while the remaining 40% are Gists.
	12 August	Product	GitHub announces that its per-project wikis are now backed by Git. The company also releases Gollum, the software powering these wikis. On the same day, Gollum is declared to be version 1.0.0.
	29 December	Userbase	Pinterest joins GitHub.
2011	19 April	Product	GitHub releases Redcarpet, a Markdown parsing library based on Upskirt.
	20 April	Growth (repository)	GitHub announces that it is hosting 2 million repositories.
	2 June	Growth	ReadWriteWeb reports that GitHub has surpassed SourceForge, Google Code, and CodePlex in total number of commits for the period January to May 2011.
	23 June	Growth (employee)	At this time, GitHub has 33 employees.
	15 August	Product	GitHub begins using the Ace code editor when editing files on the web interface.
	October (approximate)	Competition	GitLab launches.
	11 October	Product	The initial version (version 1.0.0) of Hubot, a chatbot developed by GitHub and written in CoffeeScript, is released.
	1 November	Product	GitHub launches GitHub Enterprise. GitHub Enterprise is similar to GitHub's public service but is designed for use by large-scale enterprise software development teams where the enterprise wishes to host their repositories behind a corporate firewall.
2012	17 January	Userbase	Google joins GitHub.
	6 April	Userbase	The United States Consumer Financial Protection Bureau announces that it will open source the software it writes or contracts with a third party to write. The agency decides to host its source code on GitHub.
	1 July	Financial	GitHub receives $100 million in a series of investment, primarily from Andreessen Horowitz and Tom Preston-Warner becomes CEO.
	9 July	Financial	Peter Levine, general partner at GitHub's investor Andreessen Horowitz, states that GitHub has been growing revenue at 300% annually.
	1 August	Userbase	The source code for the petitioning system We the People as well as the mobile apps White House for iOS and White House for Android are released on GitHub.
	10 September		GitHub experiences service outage due to a poor database migration.
	18 October	Censorship	GitHub goes down due to a distributed denial-of-service attack.
	13 December	Growth (employee)	At this time, GitHub has 139 employees.
2013	3 January	Product	GitHub introduces ZeroClipboard to the site, which allows for copying long lines of text and hashes with a single click.
	7 January	Product	GitHub launches Contributions, an addition to user profile pages that shows which repositories the user has been active in, as well as a calendar of activities.
	14 January	User growth, repository growth	GitHub reaches 3 million total users. At this time, GitHub also has almost 5 million repositories.
	21 January	Censorship	GitHub is blocked in China using DNS hijacking. Confirming the block, a spokesperson for GitHub says: "It does appear that we're at least being partly blocked by the Great Firewall of China". The block would be lifted on January 23, 2013, after an online protest on Sina Weibo.
	26 January	Censorship	GitHub users in China experience a man-in-the-middle attack in which attackers could have possibly intercepted traffic between the site and its users in China. The mechanism of the attack is through a fake SSL certificate. Users attempting to access GitHub received a warning of an invalid SSL certificate, which due to being signed by an unknown authority was quickly detected.
	15 February	Product	GitHub open-sources Boxen, a tool that automates setting up macOS machines.
	April	Product	GitHub adds support for the STL file format for 3D modeling.
	5 April	Product	GitHub moves GitHub Pages to a dedicated domain, github.io. GitHub cites security reasons for the migration: to remove "potential vectors for cross domain attacks targeting the main github.com session" and mitigate phishing attempts. This migration reserves github.com for GitHub itself.
	9 May	Userbase	United States president Barack Obama signs Executive Order 13642, "Making Open and Machine Readable the New Default for Government Information". As part of this new Open Data Policy, data is released on GitHub.
	23 May	Growth (repository)	GitHub reaches 3.5 million users and 6 million repositories.
	31 May	Product	GitHub announces the release of Octokit, a set of client libraries for working with the GitHub API.
	15 July	Product	GitHub launches the ChooseALicense.com website to help users choose a free and open-source software license.
	15 July	Product	The initial version of Electron (at the time called Atom Shell) is released by GitHub.
	7 August	Growth (repository)	GitHub reaches 7 million projects by their users.
	September	Growth (user)	GitHub reaches 4 million active users.
	20 December	Userbase	Facebook publishes a blog post about its progress in open-source software. At the time, Facebook has over 90 Git repositories hosted on GitHub.
	22 December	Growth (employee)	At this time, GitHub has 234 employees.
	23 December	Growth (repository)	GitHub announces it has reached 10 million repositories.
	late in the year	Userbase	Microsoft joins GitHub.
2014	6 January	Acquisition	Easel, a browser-based web design tool, announces that it has been acquired by GitHub. GitHub would announce the acquisition several days later.
	9 January	Product	GitHub launches their Bug Bounty Program and Chris Wanstrath becomes CEO for the second time.
	12 February	Legal	WhatsApp sends a DMCA takedown request to GitHub for alleged copyright and trademark violations.
	26 February	Product	GitHub releases the initial version of Atom, a free and open-source text and source code editor.
	17 March	Company	GitHub programmer Julie Ann Horvath alleges that founder and CEO Tom Preston-Werner and his wife Theresa engaged in a pattern of harassment against her that led to her leaving the company.
	April	Company	GitHub releases a statement denying Horvath's allegations of harassment. However, following an internal investigation, GitHub would confirm the claims. GitHub's CEO Chris Wanstrath would write on the company blog, "The investigation found Tom Preston-Werner in his capacity as GitHub's CEO acted inappropriately, including confrontational conduct, disregard of workplace complaints, insensitivity to the impact of his spouse's presence in the workplace, and failure to enforce an agreement that his spouse should not work in the office." CEO Preston-Werner would subsequently resign from the company.
	6 May	Product	GitHub fully releases the source code of its text editor Atom. Previously, many of its libraries and packages were open source, but the editor itself was not.
	16 May		The Crunchies announces that GitHub is a winner in Best Bootstrapped Startup.
	17 July	Company	GitHub introduces a middle management system. Prior to this, GitHub was a flat organization.
	7 October	Product	GitHub announces the GitHub Student Developer Pack, which gives students access to various premium services from GitHub and other tech companies.
	2 December	Censorship	Roscomnadzor, Russia's regulatory agency, blocks GitHub for hosting various copies of a suicide manual. Because GitHub uses HTTPS, which encrypts data between a user's computer and GitHub, internet service providers (ISP) are forced to block the whole website instead of the pages in question. Complying ISPs included Beeline, MTS, MGTS, and Megafon. Maxim Ksenzov, the Deputy Head of the Roscomnadzor, said in a statement that the block was due to GitHub not complying with earlier takedown requests for the manual on October 10, 2014. GitHub was also momentarily blocked on October 2, 2014, until the original copy of the manual was deleted.
	31 December	Censorship	GitHub is blocked in India (along with 31 other Websites) over pro-ISIS content posted by users. On 10 January 2015, GitHub would be unblocked. Again, on 12 September 2015, GitHub would be blocked all over India.
2015	28 January	Product	GitHub announces that it has doubled its maximum payout for its bounty program to $10,000.
	2 February	Userbase	The Office of Management and Budget releases budget data for fiscal years 2016 and 2017.
	7 February	Growth (employee)	At this time, GitHub has 257 employees.
	March	Competition	Google announces that it would be closing down Google Code on January 15, 2016. Most projects on the site would enter read-only mode on August 24, 2015.
	26 March	Censorship	GitHub falls victim to a massive distributed denial-of-service (DDOS) attack that lasts for more than 118 hours. The attack, which appeared to originate from China, primarily targeted GitHub-hosted user content describing methods of circumventing Internet censorship.
	30 March	Growth (user)	GitHub reports having over 9 million users and over 21.1 million repositories, making it the largest host of source code in the world.
	8 April	Product	GitHub announces Git Large File Storage (Git LFS). Git LFS allows users to store and work with large binary files in Git.
	30 April		At the conference Build 2015, Microsoft announces that Microsoft Visual Studio 2015 will have GitHub integrations, and that GitHub Enterprise would become available on Microsoft Azure.
	19 May	Product	GitHub launches the GitHub Engineering blog, which hosts information about GitHub's engineering practices.
	3 June	Company	GitHub announces the formation of GitHub Japan G.K., a subsidiary of GitHub, Inc., as well as its new office in Tokyo, Japan. This new office is the first GitHub office outside of the United States.
	25 June	Product	GitHub releases version 1.0 of its Atom text editor.
	25 July	Financial	GitHub announces it has raised $250 million in funding in a round led by Sequoia Capital. The round valued the company at approximately $2 billion.
	12 August	Product	GitHub launches a desktop client for working with the site, for macOS and Microsoft Windows.
	15 August	Growth (employee)	At this time, GitHub has 330 employees.
	1 September	Growth (user)	At this time, GitHub has around 10 million users.
	1 September	Growth (user)	Around this time, 10,000 users are reportedly joining GitHub per weekday.
	22 September	Product	GitHub launches GitHub Classroom, a way for teachers to create and share programming assignments.
	24 September		Chris Wanstrath, co-founder and CEO of GitHub, is named as one of the Fortune 40 Under 40.
	1 October – 2 October	Conference	GitHub Universe 2015 takes place in San Francisco, California. GitHub Universe is GitHub's user conference; the company would continue to host the conference in subsequent years.
	1 October	Product	GitHub announces a partnership with Yubico to allow YubiKey authentication on the GitHub website.
	3 December	Userbase	Apple open-sources its programming language Swift and hosts it on GitHub. This also marks the beginning of Apple using GitHub, as the company did not host anything on GitHub prior to this.
2016	28 January	Growth (repository)	At this time, there are over 29 million repositories on GitHub.
	28 March	Growth (user)	GitHub announces that Atom, a text editor it created, has hit 1 million monthly active users. GitHub knows this number because Atom comes with a package called metrics that tracks usage information using Google Analytics and sends it to GitHub.
	5 April	Company	GitHub announces Spokes (called Distributed Git or DGit at the time), GitHub's application-level replication system for Git, which makes GitHub more resilient to server outages.
	9 May	Product	Version 1 of Electron is released.
	10 May	Product	GitHub introduces unlimited private repositories as it changes its pricing model from a repository-based one to a user-based one.
	17 May	Growth (employee)	At this time, GitHub has 568 employees.
	6 July	Userbase	Nike, Inc. releases the source code of several of its projects on GitHub.
	14 September – 15 September	Conference	GitHub Universe 2016 takes place in San Francisco, California. GitHub Universe is "the flagship user conference for the GitHub community".
	8 October	Censorship	GitHub access is blocked by the Turkish government to prevent email leakage of a hacked account belonging to the country's Energy Minister.
	24 December	Growth (employee)	At this time, GitHub has 592 employees.
2017	14 February	Product	GitHub launches the Open Source Guides at the dedicated domain name opensource.guide.
2018	4 June	Company	Microsoft announced it is acquiring GitHub.
	16 August	Product	GitHub Actions is launched
2019	23 May	Acquisition	GitHub acquired dependabot.
	18 September	Acquisition	GitHub acquired semmle.
2020	16 March	Acquisition	GitHub announced that they are acquiring npm.
2023	28 Jan	Usage	GitHub reports having ~100 million users, making it the largest host of source code in the world

== See also ==
- Censorship of GitHub
- Timeline of social media
- Timeline of online food delivery
- Timeline of online advertising
