= Thomas Dohmke =

German software developer (born 1978)

- Born: 1978 (age 47–48); East Berlin, East Germany
- Education: Technische Universität Berlin; University of Glasgow
- Occupations: Software developer, Business executive
- Known for: ex-CEO of GitHub, co-founder of HockeyApp

Thomas Dohmke (born 1978) is a German software developer and business executive. He is best known as the former CEO of GitHub Inc. after the November 2021 resignation of Nat Friedman. He co-founded HockeyApp, which was acquired by Microsoft in 2014.

== Early life and education ==
Dohmke was born in East Berlin and studied computer engineering at Technische Universität Berlin, earning a Diplom-Ingenieur degree. He later completed a PhD in mechanical engineering at the University of Glasgow.

== Career ==
After previously serving as Chief Product Officer, Dohmke became CEO of Github in November 2021, replacing former CEO Nat Friedman. He served as CEO until 2025.

In August 2025, he announced his leave from CEO of GitHub at the end of the year to start a new company. In early 2026 Dohmke announced the launch of the new startup, called Entire. The company produces tools to merge human and AI-based programming. By February 2026 Entire was valued at $300 million.
