= RateMyTeachers =

Review site used to rate teachers' popularity and performance

Rate My Teachers
- Website type: Review site
- Website: RateMyTeachers.com
- Users: ~2,000,000 visitors per month
- Launched: 20 April 2001; 25 years ago

RateMyTeachers.com (RMT) is a review site for rating K-12 and college teachers and courses. As of April 2010, over eleven million teachers have been rated on the website.

== Founding ==
Launched in 2001 by Mister Message, LLC, the first iteration of RMT was created by Tim Davis, a high school teacher, and his wife Nancy, a junior college teacher. RMT was later sold to the same developer who created RateMyProfessors. From there it was expanded to serve an international audience, including the United States, United Kingdom, Canada, Ireland, Australia and New Zealand.

Originally, RMT was governed by a public community of volunteers who were granted the power to add, remove and delete teacher listings and teacher ratings. The public community was replaced in 2017 by private moderators.

== Acquisition ==
In 2018 RMT was acquired by a company which, for both pragmatic and regulatory reasons opted to rebuild the site from the bottom up.

In the previous version of the site, users were asked to rate their teachers on a scale of 1 to 5 in the categories of easiness, helpfulness, knowledge, and clarity, with the latter two factoring into an "overall quality" score. Because those categories were so broad and influenced by the predisposition of the reviewer, a new survey was developed in consultation with educational psychologists, teachers, and students themselves. In addition, the newly activated GDPR meant that for students in the European Union, it would no longer be safe to rate teachers individually, so the rating for EU countries was changed from teachers to courses.

To complement the new survey and comply with GDPR, the site was entirely rebuilt and launched prior to the 2019–20 school year with a new look and feel. Artist Adam Larkum was commissioned to create the imagery within the site's pages, and Simon Oxley, the graphic artist behind the Twitter bird and GitHub's Octacat was commissioned to create Owen, RMT's owl mascot.

== Controversy ==
Prior to the relaunch in 2019, RMT was controversial in certain circles with some questioning their approach. The site had previously been open to the general public with no registration or requirement to reveal their first or last name when commenting. That led some to worry that those surfing the Internet could leave libelous comments without any repercussions to their own reputation. In 2007, the Queensland College of Teachers called for the shutdown of the page "until it can be established that it provides a credible service". In 2003, the New York State United Teachers sought a court injunction to shut down the site, though the request was denied on free speech grounds. In April 2007, the British education secretary Alan Johnson said that the online harassment of teachers performed by sites such as RateMyTeachers.com needs to stop.

After the acquisition in 2018, new management's analysis of the comment database found that there were a large number of comments that violated the site's Terms and Conditions. They further concluded there was no effective way to separate the compliant from non-compliant comments. Therefore, in order to comply with GDPR and its own terms, the site took down all comments that preceded the 2019–20 school year.

== Teacher of the Year Awards ==
2020 marked the first full school year since the relaunch of RMT, and to celebrate they created a Teacher of the Year Award to recognize the best rated teachers in each state or province according to the students' reviews. To be considered, a teacher must have an average overall rating above a 4.0 and to win, they must have the highest overall number of above average ratings.

== See also ==
- Course evaluation
- Teacher quality assessment
- Educational evaluation
