= StudiVZ =

Website

- Company type: Private
- Website type: Social network
- Available in: German
- Founded: Germany (October 2005)
- Dissolved: March 2022; 4 years ago
- Headquarters: Berlin, Germany
- Founders: Ehssan Dariani (CEO) & Dennis Bemmann
- Employees: 12 Poolworks LTD.
- Website: www.studivz.net
- Registration: Required
- Launched: November 2005; 21 years ago
- Current status: Defunct

StudiVZ, SchülerVZ and MeinVZ was a social networking platform for students (in particular for college and university students in Europe) that was based in Berlin, Germany. The name is an abbreviation of the German expression Studentenverzeichnis, which means students' directory.

The service was largely comparable to other social networking sites. StudiVZ claimed to be one of the biggest social networks in Europe, with (reportedly) over 15 million members as of September 2009 across Europe, mostly in the German-speaking countries of Germany, Switzerland, and Austria. However, traffic to the site entered a state of steady decline in late 2009. After being sold to a new Investor beginning of 2017 for around 10 Mio. the new owner Momentous Entertainment declared StudiVZ insolvent in September 2017 due to a lack of cash flow for planned products. With a second new investor, the Gerbig Ventures GmbH, VZ networks launched a new group centered platform in May 2020. In the following years the website had shifted its business model towards social gaming, but was permanently shut down in March 2022 after losing its major gaming partner in China and Russia.

== History ==
The network was launched in November 2005, inside a flat in Berlin by two students named Ehssan Dariani (CEO) and Dennis Bemmann and was financed by founding investor Lukasz Gadowski. Since then, they have also collected an undisclosed sum of investments by Georg von Holtzbrinck Publishing Group, the Samwer brothers (founders of the ringtone vendor Jamba!), and other sources. In fall 2006, similar services were launched in France (StudiQG), Italy (StudiLN), Spain (EstudiLN) and Poland (StudentIX). In February 2007, another version called SchülerVZ was launched, this time focused on secondary school students, with a reported membership around three million users. As of 2010, VZ Networks claim a total userbase of over 16 million users. In February 2008, another version for non-students called meinVZ was launched.

In January 2007, StudiVZ was sold to one of its investors, Georg von Holtzbrinck Publishing Group, for 85 million euros. After a massive decline in usage since late 2009, Holtzbrinck attempted to sell StudiVZ, but as of July 2011 was not able to find any potential buyer.

In February 2012, the German newspaper Süddeutsche Zeitung reported that the VZ networks have experienced a decline in total page views by 80%. Hence, only 5.9 million of the 16 million members were active in October 2011.

From January 2011 to February 2012 the average monthly visit time has fallen steadily within the VZ networks. Its main competitor, Facebook, benefited from continuously rising numbers during the same period.

In August 2012, Comscore counted only 591,000 unique page visitors resulting in a decrease of 76.8% as compared to the previous year.

== Features ==
StudiVZ provided several features for its members. Students were able to keep and maintain a personal page containing information about their name, age, study subjects, interests, courses and group memberships within StudiVZ. They had the option to upload photographs on their personal pages. Through the search function, former classmates, fellow students, learning partners or people with the same interests could be found. The latter were often organized in groups within StudiVZ. These groups had their own pages and a discussion forum open to group members. Additionally, StudiVZ provided a private messaging service for its members, including a birthday reminder for people on their friends list.

One of StudiVZ's central functions was the "gruscheln" (a mix of the German words grüßen = to greet, and kuscheln = to cuddle). It was much like the poking function on Facebook where users can send each other notifications.

In 2008 StudiVZ launched its chat function called "Plauderkasten" (= chitchat box).

StudiVZ tried to add onto its private profile and group functions by adding Buschfunk (= bush radio) in 2009. It resembled a mixture of the Twitter feed and the Facebook Newsfeed, showing friends’ updates and news.

== Criticism ==
The most common criticism of the site was its strong similarity to Facebook. Dariani admitted that his site was based on Facebook. There were some features that set the two sites apart, such as seeing who most recently visited the profile. Besides these additional features, the most notable difference was that features bear German instead of English names. Some of the error messages revealed that one of the folders on the site was called "Fakebook", indicating that the developers were well aware of the similarities. Another difference was that sometimes while searching for users, a CAPTCHA had to be entered to view search results.

In early November 2006, StudiVZ gained some notoriety outside its realm (and also in English-speaking countries) when the word was at times listed as the most popular search term on Technorati, even eclipsing former US defense secretary Donald Rumsfeld, who had just resigned from office. This followed discussions and speculations which the company had to face in the German blogosphere, mainly about issues, such as server performance, questions of privacy, internationalization and publicity gaffes by the inexperienced team of founders.

Some bloggers have also published critical accounts and speculations about the company's business practices, claiming they included spamming, cybersquatting and over-reliance on the enthusiasm of volunteers. The company tried to respond to some of the criticisms, but the criticisms continued unabated. In March 2007, Dariani withdrew from the management, but entered the directorate.

In February 2007, hackers broke into StudiVZ and stole numerous profiles, which included passwords and e-mail addresses. As a result, the passwords of all members had to be reset.

In August 2007, studiVZ was criticized for the provocative contents of a campaign of viral videos. For instance, one of the three particular videos reportedly shows gang members murdering a vegetarian and feeding him to pigs.

Facebook sued StudiVZ in a California federal court on July 18, 2008, for copying its look, feel, features and services, the case Facebook, Inc. v. StudiVZ Ltd. StudiVZ denied the intellectual property lawsuit accusations, and asked for declaratory judgment at the District Court in Stuttgart. Facebook stated: "As with any counterfeit product, StudiVZ's uncontrolled quality standards for service, features and privacy negatively impact the genuine article." On September 10, 2009 a settlement was reached resulting in StudiVZ paying an undisclosed sum to Facebook and on September 14, 2009 the California case was dismissed with prejudice per the parties' stipulation.

== See also ==
- Facebook – Similar website
- RateMyTeachers – ratings for high school teachers
- Rate Your Students – a blog created as a reaction to RateMyProfessors
