= Facebook, Inc. v. StudiVZ Ltd. =

Federal lawsuit

- Court: United States District Court for the Northern District of California
- Full case name: Facebook, Inc. v. StudiVZ Ltd.
- Decided: September 10, 2009
- Docket nos.: 5:08-cv-03468
- Citation: No. 5:08-cv-03468 (N.D. Cal. May 4, 2009)

Court membership
- Judge sitting: Jeremy D. Fogel

Keywords
- Computer Fraud and Abuse Act, copyright infringement, forum non conveniens, trade dress, trademark law, venue

Facebook, Inc. v. StudiVZ Ltd. was a federal lawsuit filed on July 18, 2008, by Facebook, Inc. in the United States District Court for the Northern District of California against StudiVZ Ltd., a UK company with its principal place of business in Germany. StudiVZ had launched a website which was alleged to be visually and functionally similar to Facebook's site. Facebook filed a similar lawsuit the same day in the German regional court of Stuttgart and an additional related lawsuit on November 19, 2008, in the German regional court of Cologne. In May 2009 the District Court in California issued an order indicating its view that Germany was the more appropriate forum for the dispute, but withheld issuing a final order on the question until further review of the issues of personal jurisdiction could be addressed. The parties subsequently settled the California case, but continued the litigation in Germany in which the regional court of Cologne held that StudiVZ did not violate any intellectual property rights held by Facebook.

== Facts and procedural history ==
Facebook, Inc. operates a social networking website, that was founded by Mark Zuckerberg in 2004 while he was a student at Harvard University. Since 2008 Facebook has been available in the German language.

In October 2005 StudiVZ launched its website by two students from Berlin, Ehssan Dariani and Dennis Bemmann. StudiVZ is an abbreviation of the German term Studentenverzeichnis or Studienverzeichnis, which means "students' directory". StudiVZ became popular in Germany and subsequently launched several other websites designed to target high school students and students in other European countries.

In 2006 Facebook learned of StudiVZ's website and, believing that the StudiVZ website infringed its proprietary trade dress, Facebook sent a demand letter to StudiVZ. The letter alleged a series of potential claims for infringement of Facebook's intellectual property rights under German law. A similar letter was sent in January 2007. Facebook argued that StudiVZ copied the look, feel, features and services of Facebook.com.

In August 2006 and October 2007 Facebook began negotiations to purchase StudiVZ's websites. After the negotiations failed, Facebook sent demand letters to Holtzbrinck (Verlagsgruppe Georg von Holtzbrinck, that acquired StudiVZ in 2007) again alleging infringement of intellectual property rights.

On July 18, 2008, StudiVZ filed a declaratory judgment action against Facebook in the German regional court of Stuttgart in order to declare the claims by Facebook without merit. The same day, Facebook filed a complaint against StudiVZ Ltd., Verlagsgruppe Georg Von Holtzbrinck GmbH (German entity), Holtzbrinck Networks GmbH (German entity), Holtzbrinck Ventures GmbH (German entity) with the United States District Court for the Northern District of California, demanding StudiVZ desist from running a "knock-off" of Facebook's website. and filed motions to dismiss based on a lack of personal jurisdiction and on the grounds that Germany was a more convenient forum. Facebook was represented by some of the same attorneys that handled its case with the Winklevoss twins, including Neel Chatterjee and Julio Avalos of the law firm Orrick, Herrington & Sutcliffe (that case became the basis of the academy-award-winning film The Social Network). StudiVZ was represented by Los Angeles-based entertainment law firm Greenberg Glusker.

On October 22, 2008, StudiVZ, Holtzbrinck Networks GmbH and Holtzbrinck Ventures GmbH filed motions to dismiss based on a lack of personal jurisdiction and on the grounds that Germany was a more convenient forum.

On November 19, 2008, Facebook filed a second lawsuit for injunctive relief against StudiVZ in the German regional court of Cologne, alleging a series of claims under German law.

On May 4, 2009, the United States District Court for the Northern District of California issued an order indicating its view that Germany was the more appropriate forum, but deferred making a final decision on the issue until further review of the issues of personal jurisdiction could be addressed.

== District Court for the Northern District of California ==
=== Facebook's claims ===
Facebook alleged five different causes of action:

- Violations of the Computer Fraud and Abuse Act (CFAA) (18 U.S.C. § 1030). Facebook alleged that StudiVZ was not authorized to log in and use Facebook's site or services for the purpose of copying its web pages, copying its design, copying its features or copying its trade dress. Facebook also alleged that StudiVZ was not authorized to access Facebook's computer servers beyond the terms set forth in Facebook's terms of use, which StudiVZ allegedly violated by (among other things) using Facebook's servers for commercial purposes without authorization.
- Violation of California Penal Code §502(c)(2). Facebook alleged that StudiVZ knowingly accessed and without permission, took, copied, or made use of data from a computer, computer system, or computer network, or took or copied supporting documentation in violation of California Penal Code §502(c)(2).
- Trade dress infringement (15 U.S.C. § 1125). Facebook alleged that the unique look and feel of Facebook's website and services, including its graphical user interface, constituted protectable trade dress and that its user interface was unique, recognizable, and not merely functional. Facebook alleged that StudiVZ has copied Facebook's trade dress in a manner likely to cause confusion or to deceive users as to the affiliation, connection, or association of the StudiVZ websites with Facebook or as to deceive users as to the origin, sponsorship, or approval of the StudiVZ goods, services or commercial activities.
- Breach of contract. Facebook alleged that by using or registering to use its website and service, StudiVZ consented to Facebook's terms of use, thereby entering into a valid contract with Facebook. Misappropriating Facebook's intellectual property or using Facebook for an unauthorized commercial purpose is in breach of the Terms of Use.
- Breach of Implied Covenant of Good Faith and Fair Dealing. California law implies a covenant of good faith and fair dealing in all contracts entered into in the State of California. By agreeing to the Facebook's terms of use, Facebook alleged that StudiVZ entered into a California contract with Facebook and through their actions, also violated the implied covenant of good faith and fair dealing.

=== StudiVZ and Holtzbrinck Networks' position ===
StudiVZ and its owner, Holtzbrinck Networks GmbH, denied the claims and filed motions to dismiss based on a lack of personal jurisdiction and on the grounds that Germany was a more convenient forum.

=== Ruling ===
On May 4, 2009, the California Court deferred ruling with respect to forum non conveniens until the issue of personal jurisdiction could be fairly presented. The court also held that no choice-of-law determination was required here because neither the Lanham Act nor the Computer Fraud and Abuse Act (CFAA) contain a special venue provision.

Under the doctrine of forum non conveniens, courts have broad discretion to decline jurisdiction in favor of a more convenient forum. A party moving to dismiss based on forum non conveniens must show (i) the existence of an adequate alternative forum and (ii) that the balance of private and public interest factors weighs in favor of dismissal.

To determine whether to dismiss an action, the court must determine (i) the degree of deference properly accorded the plaintiff's choice of forum, (ii) whether the alternative forum proposed by the defendants is adequate to adjudicate the parties' dispute and (iii) a balance between the private and public interests implicates in the choice of forum.

Facebook, as the plaintiff, would ordinarily be accorded a great deal of deference in choice of forum. However, because Facebook is a multinational corporation with "a significant business presence in Germany," was currently litigating a similar suit in Germany and the conduct complained of occurred principally in Germany, Facebook's choice of forum was given reduced deference. The court indicated that it believed that Germany was an adequate forum because it would permit adequate litigation of the subject matter in dispute.

=== Settlement ===
On September 10, 2009, a settlement was reached resulting in StudiVZ paying an undisclosed sum to Facebook and on September 14, 2009, the California case was dismissed with prejudice per the parties' stipulation.

== Decision by the German regional court ==
Unlike the proceedings before the U.S. District Court, the parties did not settle their lawsuit in Germany. On June 16, 2009, the German regional court of Cologne decided against Facebook regarding the action for injunctive relief (33 O 374/08). The declaratory judgment action before the regional court of Stuttgart therefore became obsolete.

In Germany, Facebook had sued StudiVZ on grounds of unfair competition, trademark infringement and copyright infringement.

=== Unfair competition ===
Facebook alleged in its unfair competition charges that StudiVZ is a mere imitation of Facebook and therefore free rides on their good will. This imitation would subsequently lead to consumer confusion as to the source of the StudiVz website. Additionally, an impeded market of Facebook in the German market originated from improper access to Facebook's website by one of the founders of StudiVZ while staying in the United States for an internship. Further, Facebook based the improper access allegation on several security blackouts throughout 2007.

This unfair competition claim was rejected by the court on several grounds.

First, the court held that an imitation leading to confusion as to the source of the websites and the associated free riding on the goodwill of Facebook's website requires a certain degree of public awareness of the website. However, at the time of the introduction of StudiVz to the German market (November 2005) Facebook had not yet established the critical level of awareness in order to justify a claim for improper imitation of a famous website. Rather, until September 2006, Facebook was only designed for North American students and thus did not reach the required degree of public awareness.

Concerning the improper access of Facebook's secret information, the court found the allegations set forth by Facebook improper in order to justify the claim. Neither could Facebook prove any illegal appropriation of the source code, nor was the information accessed by one of the founders of StudiVZ as a registered member of Facebook improperly obtained. Equally, the reliance on general security blackouts was found insufficient.

Finally, the court rejected the unfair competition claim based on impediment of market entry by Facebook. After launching their German version in 2008, Facebook achieved tremendous success. Further, the court held that the alleged copying of several functions of Facebook (like the wall, the group or the poke function) are merely unprotectable ideas not covered by the imitation prohibitions of unfair competition law.

=== Trademark ===
As to the trademark claim, the court acknowledged that the Facebook logo serves as a trademark, but was as such not used by the defendant.

The design of a website can assume trademark quality as well, but only if the design is to a high degree remarkable. The court held that such a distinctiveness was not achieved by Facebook, where the logo is clearly located apart from the design, which is in its remaining parts mostly simple and functional.

=== Copyright ===
The court later decided to address the question of copyright infringement. According to German law, only copying of the source code would constitute copyright infringement. But that there are similarities in the design, structure and function of the two networks could equally derive from a conscious imitation of the other website without directly accessing and copying of the source code of Facebook. The reference to Facebook's web appearance could have simply happened by using the publicly available HTML texts and stylesheets when programming StudiVZ. Even if the programmer of StudiVZ was given the concrete task to create a website in the style of Facebook, this does not constitute copyright infringement according to German Copyright law, see §69a German Copyright Act Mere similarities between the two websites are not enough to demonstrate with sufficient probability a copying of the source code.

=== Breach of contract claim ===
Finally the court rejected a contract claim on the grounds that defendant was never a registered member of Facebook.
