= Arctic World Archive =

Data preservation facility in Svalbard

- Location within Svalbard

General information
- Status: Completed
- Type: Archive
- Location: Spitsbergen, Vei 706, Longyearbyen, Norway
- Coordinates: 78°14′17.9″N 15°26′49.5″E
- Elevation: 130 m (430 ft)
- Opened: March 27, 2017 (9 years ago)

Website
- arcticworldarchive.org

The Arctic World Archive (AWA) is a facility for data preservation, located in the Svalbard archipelago on the island of Spitsbergen of Norway, a mere few hundred metres away from the Svalbard Global Seed Vault. It contains data of historical and cultural interest from several countries, as well as all of American multinational company GitHub's open source repositories, stored on silver halide film stored under the Arctic permafrost in a large steel vault. It is run as a profit-making business by private company Piqi and the state-owned coal-mining company Store Norske Spitsbergen Kulkompani (SNSK).

== History ==
Piql is a Norwegian data-storage company that specialises in long-term storage of digital media. Piql and SNSK created the deeply buried steel vault out of a mineshaft of an abandoned coal mine. At the time of its opening as the Arctic World Archive on 27 March 2017, the Brazilian, Mexican and Norwegian governments deposited copies of various historical documents in the vault.

== Description ==
The Svalbard archipelago, situated north of mainland Norway, about 970 kilometres (600 mi) from the North Pole, is declared demilitarised by 42 nations, as established in the Svalbard Treaty signed after World War I. This means that the territory cannot be used for military purposes, and the company describes the location as "one of the most geopolitically secure places in the world". The archive facility is on Spitsbergen, the biggest island in Svalbard.

The facility is a large steel vault located somewhere between 150 metres (490 ft) and 300 metres (980 ft) below the ground or permafrost inside an abandoned coal mine (Store Norske Gruve 3) that reaches over 300 metres (980 ft) into the side of a mountain. The facility is secured with a concrete wall and a steel gate. The deposits themselves are stored in secure shipping containers behind the gate.

Because of the island's Arctic climate and resulting permafrost, even if the power to the facility failed, the temperature inside the vault would remain below freezing point, which is cold enough to preserve the vault's contents for decades or more, with the vault 250 metres (820 ft) below the permafrost. The vault is situated deeply enough to avoid damage even from nuclear and EMP weapons.

== Long term storage ==
Data is stored offline on film reels made using a refined version of ordinary darkroom photography technology. The film is made of polyester coated in silver halide crystals and powder-coated with iron oxide, and has a life span of at least 500 and possibly up to 2,000 years, if stored in optimum conditions.

Realising that people in the far future may have difficulty understanding what they see in the vault, a kind of "Rosetta Stone" has been devised to help decode the data, in the form of a guide to interpreting the archive. The guides are all readable by eye, after magnification, and are written in English, Arabic, Spanish, Chinese, and Hindi.

Clients who pay for the storage of data can send their data digitally or physically. The data can be retrieved at any time from the vault, but it is not a quick process, because the data is not connected to the internet. If data is requested, the relevant reel of film has to be manually retrieved, then uploaded via a fibre optic connection to the mainland, to Piql's headquarters in Drammen; the fastest possible retrieval time is 20–30 minutes, but it can take up to 24 hours with an active subscription and up to 72 hours without an active subscription.

=== Contents ===
The archive stores a wide range of historical and cultural data. Governments, researchers, religious institutions, media companies and others store some of their most significant records in the vault; Brazil and Norway have archived their constitutions and other important historical papers.

The archive includes information about the biodiversity of Australia, and examples of culturally significant Australian works. It includes the Atlas of Living Australia, and machine learning models created by Geoscience Australia, which assist in understanding topics such as bushfires and climate change.

The archive includes a digitised version of the painting The Scream by Edvard Munch for the National Museum of Norway, and a digitised version of Dante's master-work of Italian literature, The Divine Comedy for the Vatican Library.

In March 2018, German science TV show Galileo deposited their first show, and made a documentary about it for ProSieben.

In October 2020, the first deposit from a Nobel Prize laureate went to the Archive: 14 books of the 2018 Nobel Prize in Literature winner, Olga Tokarczuk, were placed on PiqlFilm, undertaken by the Piql Polska and funded by publisher Wydawnictwo Literackie.

== GitHub Archive Program ==
In November 2019, GitHub announced that all of its public open source code would be archived in a code vault at the Arctic World Archive, as part of its GitHub Archive Program.

In July 2020, the 21-terabyte February site archive was stored at the AWA. The data is stored on 186 film reels measuring 1 kilometre (0.62 mi) long, covered in code stored as matrix (2D) barcode (Boxing barcode), which store data very densely (each of the 200 platters of data carry 120 gigabytes). The amount of code stored has been described thus: "If someone who types at about 60 words a minute sat down and tried to fill up all that space, it would take 111,300 years". The first reel holds the code for the Linux kernel and the Android operating system, plus that of 6,000 other major open source applications.

Further to the general guide to the vault, the "Tech Tree" details software development, programming languages and other information about computer programming. The Guide and the Tech Tree are written in a collaborative process as a public Git repository.

GitHub's Arctic Cold Vault is a "cold layer" of archiving. The "hot" (accessible online repositories) and "warm" (e.g. Internet Archive) layers of GitHub's code archives both have the weakness of being founded upon electronics. It is an incomplete but more secure snapshot of data, with archiving intended at five-year intervals.

== See also ==
- Svalbard Global Seed Vault, which stores seeds from all over the world in case of large-scale crises
- Internet Archive
