= Boxing barcode =

Type of barcode

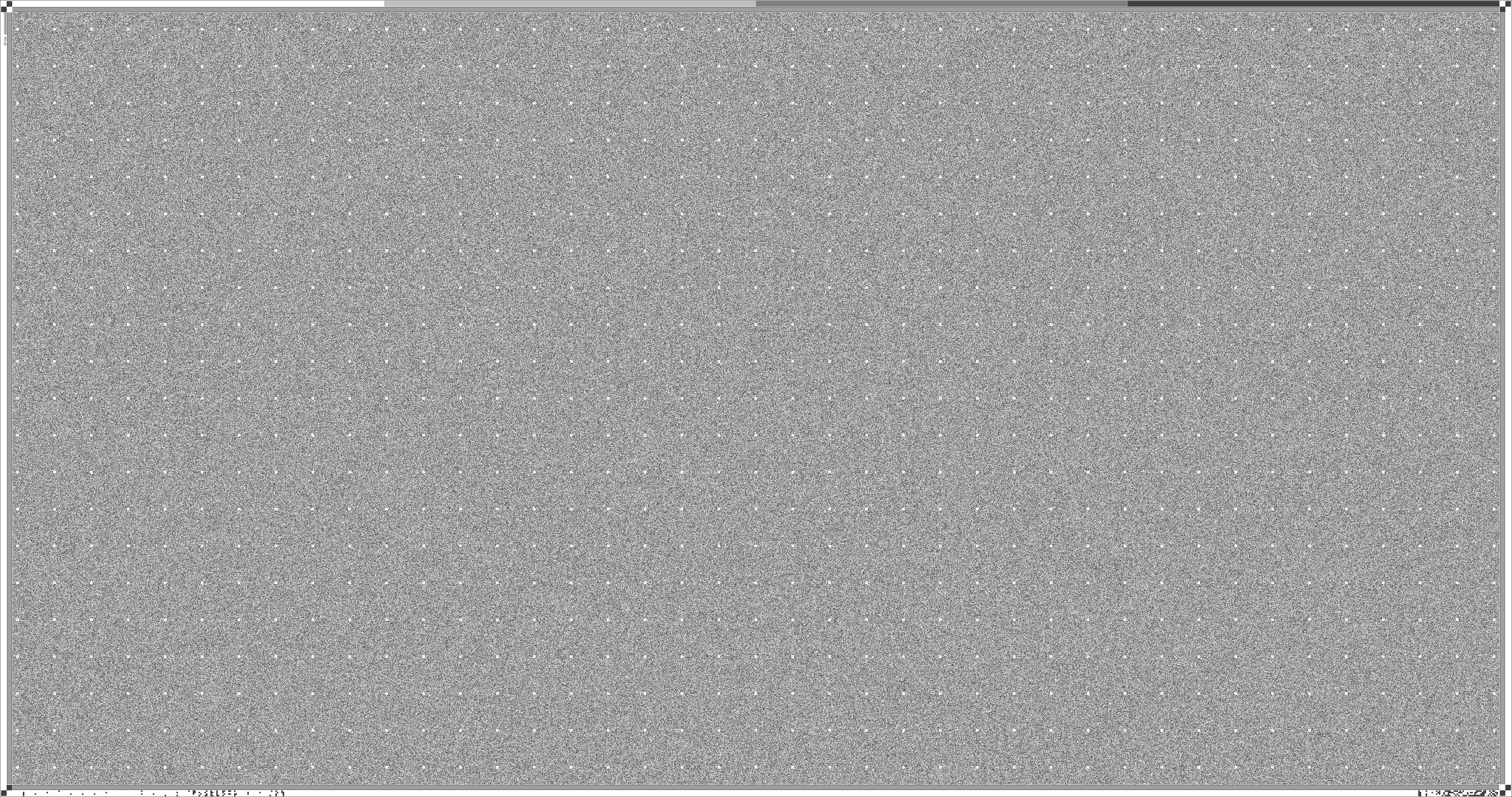
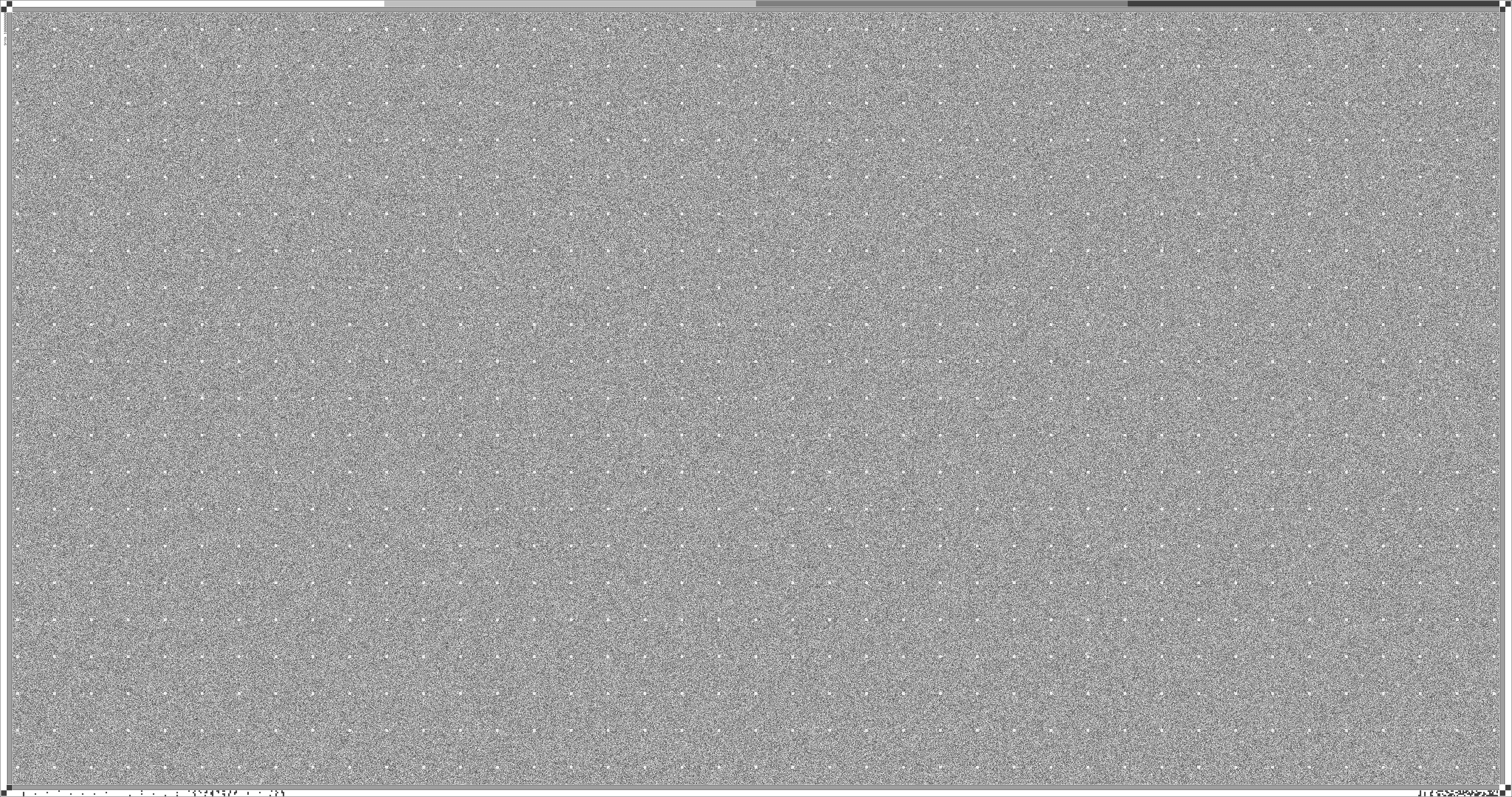
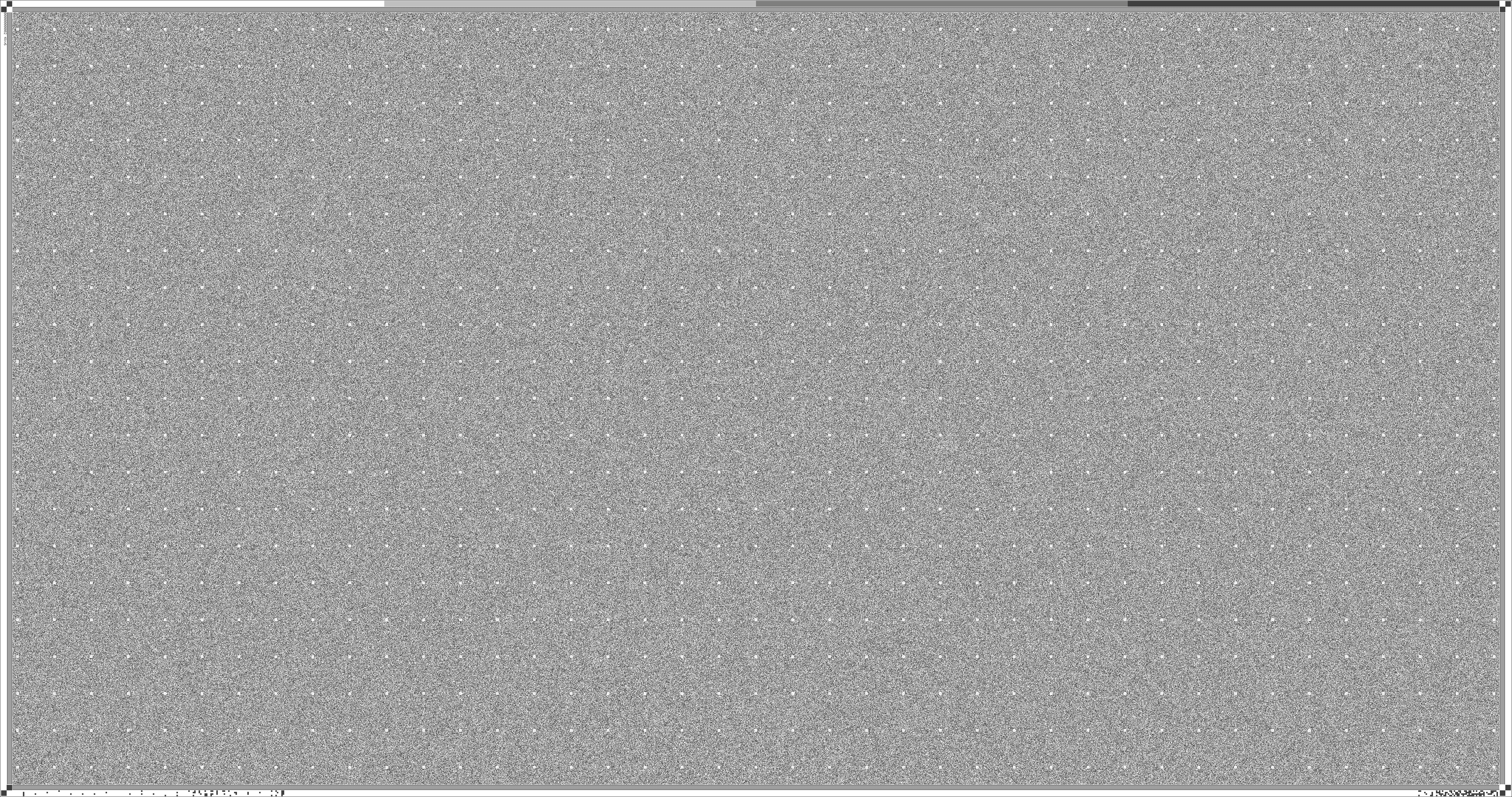
Samples of a Boxing frame

Boxing is high-capacity 2D barcode. The flexible barcode format is fully customizable in terms of frame geometry, number of symbols per pixel and forward-error-correction (FEC) method. This makes it a suitable choice for storing large amounts of any kind of digital data on storage mediums such paper, photographic film or similar.

== Applications ==
Boxing barcode is used on piqlFilm by Piql AS to store a large volume of information in the Arctic World Archive:

- the Vatican Library
- the photographic collection
- GitHub
- and other

== Format ==

The Boxing barcode used in the piqlFilm consists 4096 rows and 2160 cols. Each frame has:

- border
- four corner marks
- external bars (reference, calibration, structural metadata, human-readable)
- data container
- sync points
