= Electron (software framework) =

Development framework built on Chromium

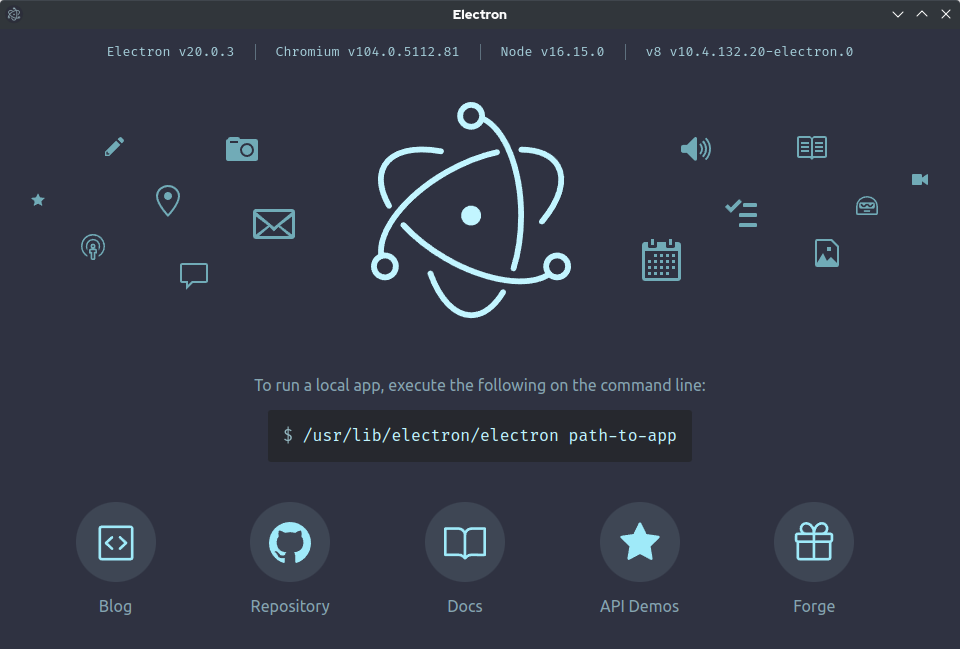
- Original author: GitHub
- Developer: OpenJS Foundation
- Release: 15 July 2013; 13 years ago
- Stable release: 44.4.5 / September 23, 2026; 42 days ago
- Preview release: 46.0.0-nightly.20260911 / September 11, 2026; 54 days ago
- Written in: C++, JavaScript, Objective-C++ and Objective-C
- Operating system: Linux, macOS, and Windows
- Platform: IA-32, x86-64, ARM
- License: MIT License (original components); BSD license, LGPL, and others (for Chromium/NodeJS core)
- Website: www.electronjs.org
- Repository: github.com/electron/electron

Electron (formerly known as Atom Shell) is a free and open-source software framework developed and maintained by OpenJS Foundation. The framework is designed to create desktop applications using web technologies (mainly HTML, CSS and JavaScript, although other technologies such as front-end frameworks and WebAssembly are possible) that are rendered using a version of the Chromium browser engine and a back end using the Node.js runtime environment. It also uses various APIs to enable functionality such as native integration with Node.js services and an inter-process communication module.

Electron was originally built for Atom and is the main GUI framework behind several other open-source projects including GitHub Desktop, Light Table, WordPress Desktop, and Eclipse Theia. It is also used in Microsoft's proprietary code editor Visual Studio Code.

== Architecture ==
Chromium forms the basis of a managed runtime, allowing application developers to write cross-platform applications in memory-safe JavaScript or TypeScript and target Web browser technologies including HTML, CSS, and SVG for graphics.

Electron-based applications include a "main" process and several "renderer" processes. The main process runs the logic for the application (e.g., menus, shell commands, lifecycle events), and can then launch multiple renderer processes by instantiating an instance of the BrowserWindow class, which loads a window that appears on the screen to render HTML, CSS, etc.

Both the main and renderer processes can run with Node.js integration if the nodeIntegration field in the main process is set to true.

Most of Electron's APIs are written in C++ or Objective-C and are exposed directly to the application code through JavaScript bindings.

== History ==
In September 2021, Electron moved to an eight-week release cycle between major versions to match the release cycle of Chromium Extended Stable and to comply with a new requirement from the Microsoft Store that requires browser-based apps to be within two major versions of the latest release of the browser engine.

Electron frequently releases new major versions along every other Chromium release. The latest three stable versions are supported by the Electron team.

Version history
Release	Status	Release date	End of life date	Chromium version	Node.js version	Module version	N-API version	ICU version
v1.8.x	End-of-Life	12 December 2017	20 December 2018	59	8.2	57	?	?
v2.0.x	End-of-Life	1 May 2018	24 April 2019	61	8.9	57	?	?
v3.1.x	End-of-Life	18 September 2018	29 July 2019	66	10.2	64	3	?
v4.2.x	End-of-Life	20 December 2018	22 October 2019	69	10.11	69	3	62.2
v5.1.x	End-of-Life	24 April 2019	4 February 2020	73	12.0	70	4	63.1
v6.1.x	End-of-Life	29 July 2019	18 May 2020	76	12.4	73	4	64.2
v7.3.x	End-of-Life	22 October 2019	25 August 2020	78	12.8	75	4	64.2
v8.3.x	End-of-Life	4 February 2020	16 November 2020	80	12.13	76	5	65.1
v9.4.x	End-of-Life	18 May 2020	2 March 2021	83	12.14	80	5	65.1
v10.4.x	End-of-Life	25 August 2020	25 May 2021	85	12.16	82	5	65.1
v11.4.x	End-of-Life	16 November 2020	30 August 2021	87	12.18	85	5	65.1
v12.0.x	End-of-Life	2 March 2021	15 November 2021	89	14.16	87	7	68.1
v13.x.y	End-of-Life	25 May 2021	31 January 2022	91	14.16	89	7	68.1
v14.x.y	End-of-Life	30 August 2021	29 March 2022	92	14.17	89	8	69.1
v15.x.y	End-of-Life	21 September 2021	24 May 2022	94	16.5	98	?	?
v16.x.y	End-of-Life	15 November 2021	24 May 2022	96	16.9	99	?	?
v17.x.y	End-of-Life	1 February 2022	2 August 2022	98	16.13	101	?	?
v18.x.y	End-of-Life	29 March 2022	26 September 2022	100	16.13	103	?	?
v19.x.y	End-of-Life	24 May 2022	29 November 2022	102	16.14	106	?	?
v20.x.y	End-of-Life	2 August 2022	7 February 2023	104	16.15	?	?	?
v21.x.y	End-of-Life	26 September 2022	4 April 2023	106	16.16	?	?	?
v22.x.y	End-of-Life	30 November 2022	10 October 2023	108	16.17	?	?	?
v23.x.y	End-of-Life	30 November 2022	15 August 2023	110	18.12	?	?	?
v24.x.y	End-of-Life	4 April 2023	10 October 2023	112	18.14	?	?	?
v25.x.y	End-of-Life	30 May 2023	5 December 2023	114	18.15	?	?	?
v26.x.y	End-of-Life	15 August 2023	20 February 2024	116	18.16	?	?	?
v27.x.y	End-of-Life	10 October 2023	16 April 2024	118	18.17	?	?	?
v28.x.y	End-of-Life	5 December 2023	11 June 2024	120	18.18	?	?	?
v29.x.y	End-of-Life	20 February 2024	20 August 2024	122	20.9	?	?	?
v30.x.y	End-of-Life	16 April 2024	15 October 2024	124	20.11	?	?	?
v31.x.y	End-of-Life	11 June 2024	7 January 2025	126	20.14	?	?	?
v32.x.y	End-of-Life	20 August 2024	4 March 2025	128	20.16	?	?	?
v33.x.y	End-of-Life	15 October 2024	29 April 2025	130	20.18	?	?	?
v34.x.y	End-of-Life	14 January 2025	24 June 2025	132	20.18	?	?	?
v35.x.y	End-of-Life	4 March 2025	2 September 2025	134	22.14	?	?	?
v36.x.y	End-of-Life	29 April 2025	28 October 2025	136	22.14	?	?	?
v37.x.y	End-of-Life	24 June 2025	13 January 2026	138.0.7204.251	22.21.1	?	?	?
v38.x.y	End-of-Life	2 September 2025	10 March 2026	140.0.7339.249	22.21.1	?	?	?
v39.x.y	End-of-Life	28 October 2025	5 May 2026	142.0.7444.235	22.21.1	?	?	?
v40.x.y	End-of-Life	13 January 2026	30 June 2026	144.0.7547.0	24.11.1	?	?	?
v41.x.y	End-of-Life	10 March 2026	25 August 2026	146.0.7650.0	24.14.0	?	?	?
v42.x.y	End-of-Life	5 May 2026	20 October 2026	148.0.7778.96	24.15.0	?	?	?
v43.x.y	Active	30 June 2026	5 January 2027	150.0.7871.46	24.17.0	?	?	?
v44.x.y	Active	24 August 2026	2 March 2027	152	24.18.1	?	?	?
v45.x.y	Current	20 October 2026	27 April 2027	156	24.22.0	?	?	?
v46.x.y	Alpha	5 January 2027	22 June 2027	160	26.13.0	?	?	?
v47.x.y	Nightly	2 March 2027	17 August 2027	164	26.13.0	?	?	?

== Usage ==
Desktop applications built with Electron include Atom, balenaEtcher, Discord, Slack, and Visual Studio Code. The Brave browser was based on Electron before it was rewritten to use Chromium directly, while Microsoft Teams used Electron before 2.0.

== Reception ==
The most common criticism of Electron is that it necessitates software bloat when used for simple programs. As a result, Michael Larabel has referred to the framework as "notorious among most Linux desktop users for being resource heavy, not integrating well with most desktops, and generally being despised". Researchers have shown that Electron's large feature set can be hijacked by bad actors with write access to the source JavaScript files. This requires root access on Unix-like systems and is not considered to be a vulnerability by the Electron developers. Those who are concerned that Electron is not always based on the newest version of Chromium have recommended progressive web applications as an alternative.

== See also ==
- Apache Cordova
- Chromium Embedded Framework (CEF)
- HTML Application
- Qt WebEngine
- XULRunner
- JavaFX WebView
- DotNetBrowser
- List of open-source application frameworks
- Progressive web app
- Node.js
- Tauri (software framework)
- Flutter (software)
- PyQt
