= Simon Oxley =

British graphic designer (1969–2026)

- Born: 1969; Kingsclere, Hampshire, England
- Died: 4 April 2026 (aged 56)
- Other name: Idokungfoo
- Occupations: Graphic designer, illustrator
- Years active: 1989–2026
- Known for: Designing the original Twitter bird logo and the GitHub Octocat logo
- Notable work: Twitter bird logo; Twitter Failbot; GitHub Octocat; Bitly Puffer Fish; DigitalOcean Sammy the Shark; iStockphoto logo redesign

Simon Oxley (1969 – April 2026) was a British freelance graphic designer and illustrator who was most famous for designing the original bird logo for Twitter, the Octocat logo for GitHub, the puffer fish for Bitly, and Sammy the Shark for DigitalOcean. Operating predominantly under the studio pseudonym Idokungfoo, Oxley became a pioneer in the microstock economy and played a seminal role in establishing the friendly, mascot-driven aesthetic of the Web 2.0 era.

== Early life and education ==
Oxley was born in 1969 in the rural village of Kingsclere, United Kingdom. From an early age, he developed a profound fascination with graphic novels, comic strips, and heavily illustrated storybooks. Rather than a passive consumer, he spent considerable hours meticulously tracing comic images to analyse line structure and character anatomy, often engaging in friendly drawing competitions with his peers. His early artistic inclination was rewarded during his school years, where he frequently incorporated elaborate illustrations into his history and geography assignments, earning him "House Points" for his visual presentation over written content.

Seeking formal training, Oxley enrolled in a one-year foundational art and design course at Basingstoke Technical College from 1986 to 1987. The curriculum immersed him in classical drawing, anatomical study, and the techniques of old masters, supplemented by regular visits to London art museums. Crucially, he was also introduced to traditional darkroom photography, which instilled in him an understanding of light, contrast, and negative space that later informed his digital vector work.

He subsequently moved to the south coast of England to attend the Bournemouth and Poole College of Art and Design between 1987 and 1989. His time there was transformative, deeply influenced by guest lectures from industry giants such as the American graphic designer Saul Bass and the British war photographer Tim Page. Bass taught Oxley the power of visual reduction and clean corporate metaphors, while Page's visceral work demonstrated the importance of emotional impact. This dialectic shaped Oxley's signature style: polished corporate icons retaining a spark of whimsical humanity.

== Career ==
=== Early career and Japan (1989–2011) ===
Following his graduation in 1989, Oxley entered the burgeoning interactive technology sector, working for a small UK-based video game company. In a pre-CAD era, his responsibilities involved manual artworking for game cassette inserts, requiring him to physically cut and arrange typography alongside illustrations using hot wax machines. During the early 1990s, he experimented with large-format fine art painting, but after failing to gain traction in the traditional gallery circuit, he gave away most of his canvases and pivoted definitively towards commercial graphic design and digital illustration.

Around 1999, Oxley relocated to Japan, a move that radically transformed his aesthetic vocabulary. He initially worked for a design and multimedia company in Harajuku, Tokyo's epicentre of youth culture and experimental design. Seeking a quieter environment, he later moved to Fukuoka with his Japanese wife, Noriko. In Japan, Oxley was deeply influenced by the cultural acceptance of the kawaii (cute) aesthetic and the ubiquitous use of yuru-chara (mascots) in serious corporate and institutional communication. This validated his inclination to create whimsical characters for corporate applications.

In 2002, Oxley founded his independent design studio under the moniker Idokungfoo (a phonetic stylisation of "I do kung fu"). He produced corporate annual reports and character-driven brand promotions for the domestic market.

=== The Microstock Economy and iStockphoto ===
In 2004, a promotional offer for the Adobe Creative Suite led Oxley to discover the pioneering microstock photography platform iStockphoto. Recognising a severe shortage of high-quality vector illustrations on a platform dominated by photography, Oxley began prolifically uploading his catalogue of abstract characters and hybrid animals. His clean, scalable vectors quickly flooded search results, turning his portfolio into a global advertising platform.

His success caught the attention of iStockphoto's founder and CEO, Bruce Livingstone, leading the company to officially commission Oxley to redesign the overarching iStockphoto corporate logo.

=== Twitter Bird Logo (2006) ===
Oxley is most famous for designing the original bird logo for the microblogging platform Twitter. In 2006, he uploaded a geometric, light-blue avian illustration to iStockphoto. Seeking a friendly visual identity to mitigate the technical nature of their SMS-based service, Twitter's founders purchased the image for $10–15; after platform fees, Oxley received approximately $2–6.

The bird became the face of the platform during its hyper-growth phase. Oxley was completely unaware of its adoption until 2009, when he spotted his bird on a CNN broadcast. However, iStockphoto's royalty-free licensing agreements explicitly prohibited the use of downloaded assets as registered trademarks or exclusive corporate logos. Consequently, Twitter was legally compelled to abandon Oxley's exact vector and undergo a corporate redesign to secure its intellectual property. Despite the nominal financial compensation, Oxley publicly expressed gratitude, acknowledging that the global visibility generated by the Twitter bird served as an unparalleled marketing catalyst for his career. Additionally, Oxley designed Twitter's "Failbot", a whimsical illustration of a broken robot used during the site's frequent early server outages to successfully de-escalate user frustration.

=== GitHub "Octocat" (2007–2008) ===
In 2007, Oxley designed and uploaded a vector depicting a biological chimera: a feline head attached to five octopus tentacles, which he cheekily titled "Octopuss".

The founders of the code-hosting platform GitHub, looking for a humorous 404 error page illustration that referenced the complex Git technical command known as an "octopus merge", discovered Oxley's image. Aware of the legal constraints of microstock licenses, GitHub proactively contacted Oxley and successfully negotiated the exclusive rights to the character.

Renamed the "Octocat", the character was overwhelmingly embraced by the global open-source programming community, becoming a ubiquitous cultural icon in Silicon Valley. GitHub later hired internal illustrator Cameron McEfee to expand the character's universe (dubbing her "Mona Lisa the Octocat") and developed the stylised "Invertocat" silhouette, but the foundational anatomy and conception remain exclusively Oxley's.

=== Corporate Mascots and Later Career ===
Capitalising on his reputation as the definitive architect of friendly visual identities for complex Software as a Service (SaaS) and cloud computing startups, Oxley created a taxonomy of famous tech mascots. His commissioned works include:

- Sammy the Shark for DigitalOcean
- The Bitly Puffer Fish for the URL management service Bitly
- Pulumipus for the infrastructure-as-code platform Pulumi
- Sparky for the venture capital firm boldstart.vc
- HOSSTA for API management platform Hoss.com
- Cody for coding metrics platform YEN/Software.com
- Interactive avatars for the social music streaming platform Turntable.fm

Between 2012 and 2014, Oxley relocated back to Europe with his family, settling in a rural home near Oxford, England.

In the 2020s, operating predominantly through the design network Dribbble (under the handle simonox), Oxley expanded his style into surrealistic biology, abstract expressionism, and dark humour. Works from this period—such as "Boingtopia", "don't burst", "shut up potty", and "Jazz potato"—demonstrate a departure from clean corporate constraints towards complex emotional and somatic anxieties.

Refusing to be confined to the digital realm, Oxley was a prolific physical artist. He hand-sculpted models using air-dry clay and produced large-format mixed-media paintings, such as the acrylic work "I'M Sprinting, Painting, Painting For My Life", which were exhibited and sold through platforms like Saatchi Art, London's ICA, and Gallery 1988 in Los Angeles.

== Personal life and death ==
Oxley was married to Noriko, a Japanese citizen he met while living in Tokyo. They had two sons, Tyler and Hagen. The family shared a deep inclination for manual artistic exploration. Oxley lived in the countryside near Oxford, where he worked from his home studio.

Oxley passed away in April 2026, at the age of 56. His death was widely mourned within the tech and design communities, with numerous designers and industry professionals paying tribute to his foundational contributions to the internet's visual culture.

== Notes ==
- Note: He is not to be confused with Simon Oxley, the former Chief Financial Officer (CFO) of XCF Global Capital Inc.
