= Nat Friedman =

American technology executive and investor

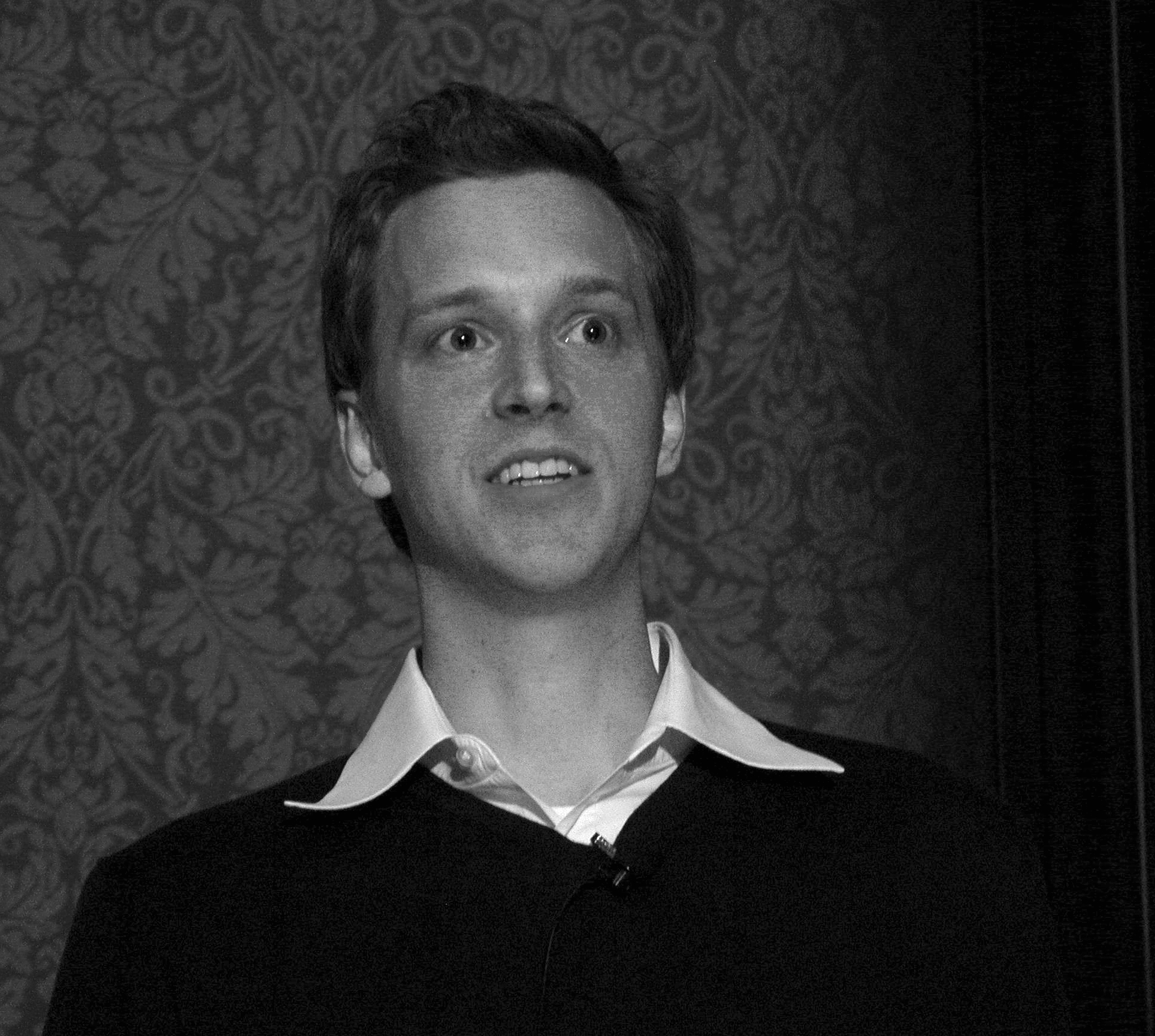
- Friedman in April 2006
- Born: Nathaniel Dourif Friedman; August 6, 1977 (age 49)
- Education: Massachusetts Institute of Technology (BS)
- Known for: CEO of GitHub (2018–2021)
- Spouse: Stephanie Schatz (m. 2009)
- Children: 1
- Website: nat.org

Nathaniel Dourif Friedman (born 6 August 1977) is an American technology executive and investor, currently head of product at Meta Superintelligence Labs. He was the chief executive officer (CEO) of GitHub and former chairman of the GNOME Foundation. Friedman is currently a board member at Arc Institute and an advisor of Midjourney.

== Early life and education ==
Friedman attended and graduated from St. Anne's-Belfield School in 1995.

In 1996, while a freshman at the Massachusetts Institute of Technology, Friedman befriended Miguel de Icaza on LinuxNet, the IRC network that Friedman had created to discuss Linux. As an intern at Microsoft, Friedman worked on the IIS web server. At MIT, he studied Computer Science and Mathematics and graduated with a Bachelor of Science degree in 1999.

== Career ==
In 1999, Friedman co-founded Ximian (originally called International Gnome Support, then Helix Code) with de Icaza to develop applications and infrastructure for GNOME, the project de Icaza had started with the aim of producing a free software desktop environment. The company was later bought by Novell in 2003.

At Novell, Friedman was the Chief Technology and Strategy Officer for Open Source until January 2010. There he launched the Hula Project which began with the release of components of Novell NetMail as open source. During his tenure, Novell began an effort to migrate 6,000 employees away from Microsoft Windows to SUSE Linux and from Microsoft Office to OpenOffice.org. Friedman's final project before his departure was work on SUSE Studio.

During his sabbatical, Friedman created and hosted a podcast called Hacker Medley with friend and former Ximian employee Alex Graveley.

In May 2011, Friedman and de Icaza founded Xamarin, with Friedman as CEO. The company was created to offer commercial support for Mono, a project that de Icaza had initiated at Ximian to provide a free software implementation of Microsoft's .NET software stack. At Xamarin they focused on continuing to develop Mono and MonoDevelop and marketing the cross-platform Xamarin SDK to developers targeting mobile computing devices and video game consoles. In 2016, Xamarin was acquired by Microsoft.

With the June 2018 announcement of Microsoft's $7.5 billion (~$9.2 billion in 2024) acquisition of GitHub, the companies simultaneously announced that Friedman, then a Microsoft corporate vice president, would become GitHub's new CEO. GitHub's co-founder and then-current CEO Chris Wanstrath had been leading a search for his replacement since August 2017. Friedman assumed the role of CEO on October 29, 2018. During his tenure as CEO, Friedman introduced a number of new products rapidly, including GitHub Copilot, GitHub Codespaces, a native GitHub mobile app for iOS and Android, the GitHub Advanced Security product, GitHub Sponsors to support open source developers financially, and a new GitHub CLI. Friedman also acquired six companies including NPM, Semmle, Dependabot, and PullPanda. In November 2021, Friedman announced that he was stepping down as CEO.

Friedman co-founded California YIMBY in 2017 to address California's housing shortage.

In 2023, Friedman created nat.dev, a web interface for popular large language models.

Alongside Daniel Gross, Friedman also has made significant investments in the AI space through a fund called C2 Investments, as well as running an AI grant program that gives funding and Microsoft Azure credits. During the depositor run on Silicon Valley Bank in mid-March 2023, Friedman provided capital to multiple startups.

In June 2025, Friedman joined Meta Platforms to co-lead the newly established Meta Superintelligence Labs alongside Alexandr Wang, overseeing the development of Meta's AI-driven products and applied research.

== Personal life ==
He has been married to Stephanie Friedman (née Schatz) since 2009. They have a daughter, and live in Menlo Park since 2022, having moved there from San Francisco after a home invasion.
