= Julio Avalos =

American technology executive and attorney

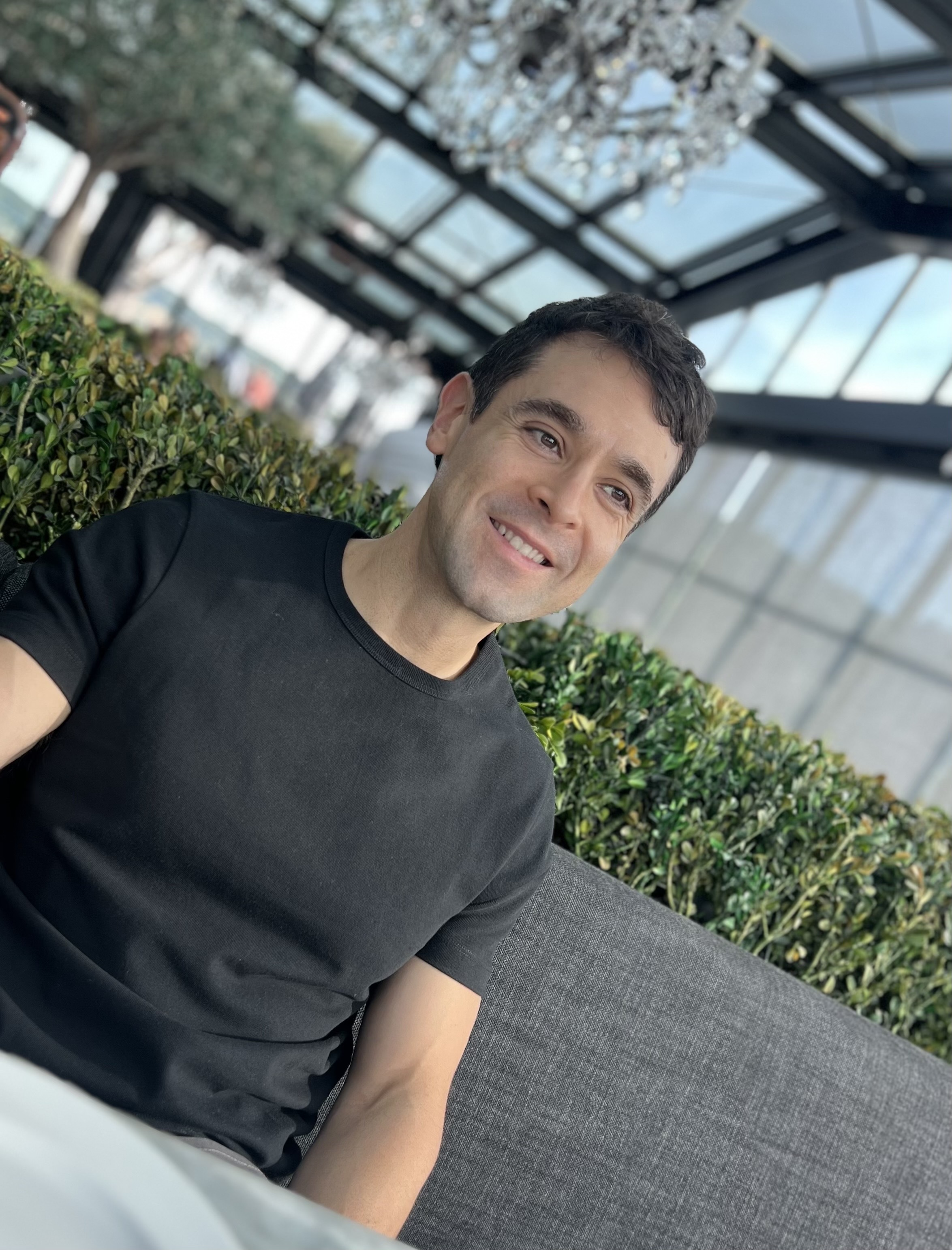
- Born: Julio C. Avalos
- Education: University of Florida (BA in English), Columbia University (JD)
- Known for: COO of GitHub (2012-2018)

Julio Avalos is a Guatemalan-American technology leader, business executive, attorney, and public speaker. According to The Wall Street Journal, Avalos has "helped shape the social phase of the digital era" as well "the founding of the internet as we know it". He is most well known for representing early-stage Facebook and its founder Mark Zuckerberg in the case that later served as the basis for the 2010 Aaron Sorkin film The Social Network as well as his role as the chief operator at GitHub, the global software platform, during the company's early, hyper-growth stage. He is a public speaker on software and technology issues, as well as general social critique and analysis on tech and culture. Avalos is considered an early proponent of remote work and best practices, as well as open source software. He has advocated for greater regulation of technology companies, as well as dramatic structural changes to the legal profession.

Avalos is currently a Board Member at Observable, Inc., the data visualization company, as well as co-founder and advisor to Shades, the Gen-Z news application.
