= Chris Wanstrath =

American tech entrepreneur, GitHub co-founder (born 1985)

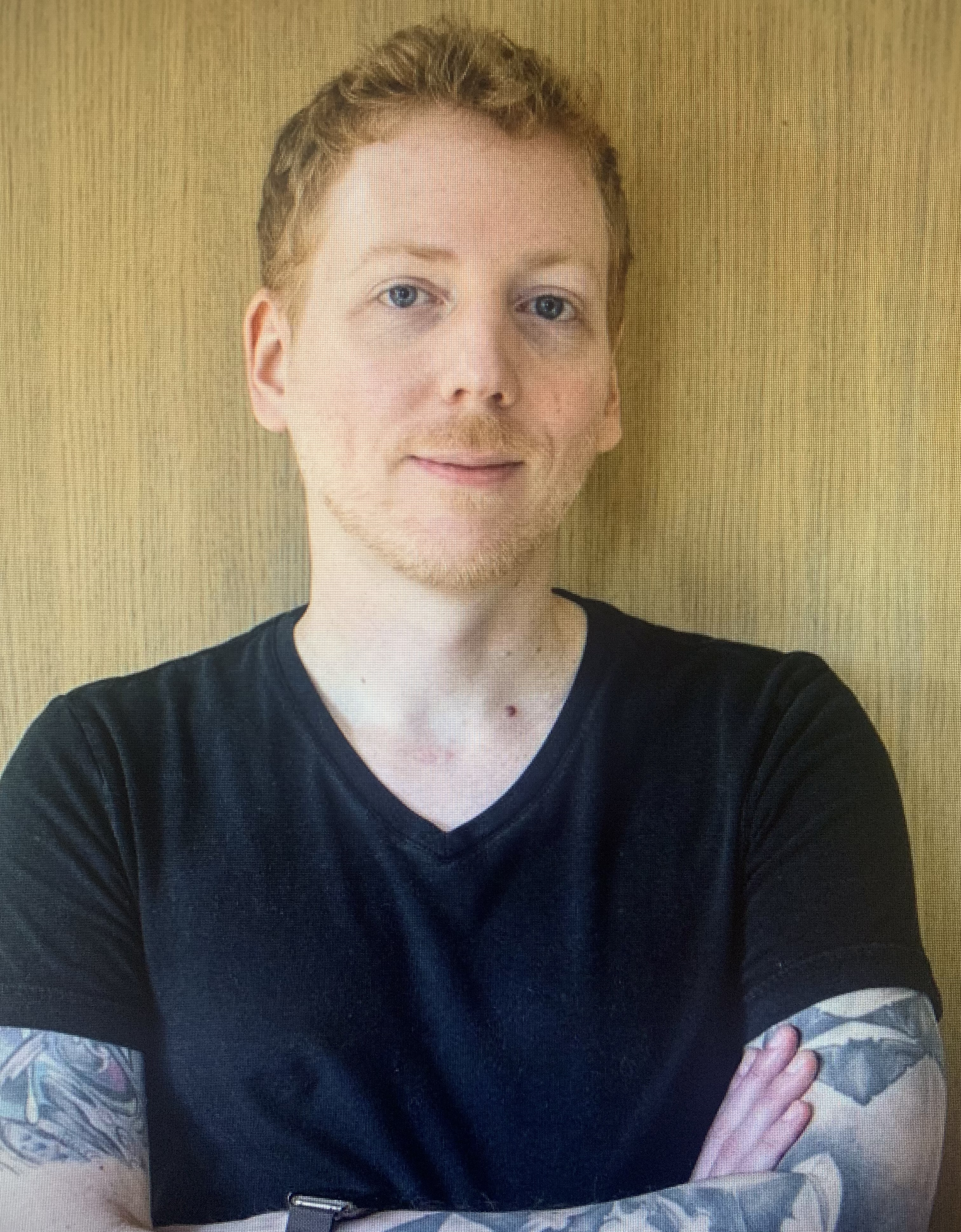
- Wanstrath in 2023
- Born: March 13, 1985 (age 41); Ohio, US
- Education: University of Cincinnati (dropped out)
- Known for: Co-founder and former CEO of GitHub

Chris Wanstrath (born March 13, 1985) is an American technology entrepreneur and programmer. He is the founder of Null Games, and the co-founder and former CEO of GitHub, an Internet hosting service for software development and version control using Git. Wanstrath co-founded GitHub in 2008 and sold it to Microsoft in 2018. Before starting GitHub, he worked with CNET on GameSpot and Chowhound. In addition to GitHub, he created the Atom text editor, Ruby's Resque job queue, the Mustache templating language, and the pjax JavaScript library. According to Forbes his net worth is estimated at US$1.8-2.2 billion and is listed in America's richest entrepreneurs under 40, as well as Fortune's 40 under 40 and he was named in CNBC's Disruptor 50 list.

== Early life ==
Wanstrath was born on March 13, 1985. From a young age, he loved video games, and wanted to create his own. He graduated from St. Xavier High School in Cincinnati in 2003 and briefly studied English at the University of Cincinnati. He left the university after getting a job in San Francisco at CNET Networks.

== Career ==
Before the success of GitHub, Wanstrath ran a Ruby on Rails consulting shop with P. J. Hyett (a GitHub co-founder). Prior to this, Wanstrath was at CNET Networks, where he worked on GameSpot and the launch of Chowhound. He was a completely self-taught programmer until his job with CNET.

In 2008, Wanstrath co-founded GitHub and the service had 100,000 users by July 2009. It was named to CNBC's Disruptor List five times between 2008 and 2018. Wanstrath served as its CEO until the Series A round of funding in 2012 and then president until 2014 at which time he returned to the CEO role. He was CEO until October 2018. At the time, GitHub had close to 1000 employees, over 20 million users, and $300 million in annualized recurring revenue.

In June 2018, Microsoft acquired GitHub for $7.5 billion (~$9.46 billion in 2025) in an all-stock deal. At the time, GitHub was the world's largest host service for software code. In addition to GitHub, Wanstrath created the job queue program Resque, the Mustache templating language, and the Atom text editor. He's also created the pjax JavaScript library.

Wanstrath is on the board of trustees for the Computer History Museum.

In 2023 Wanstrath announced the development of a new game developer platform called Void, scheduled to launch in 2024.

In 2024, Wanstrath and Andreas Kling launched the Ladybird Browser Initiative, a non-profit whose goal is to develop a new web browser that does not rely on corporate deals or advertising. Anticipated release of the browser is Summer of 2026.

=== Null Games ===
In February 2023, announced a new games publishing studio, Null Games. Null helps developers with marketing, development costs, porting, and publishing. The company's first released title was an ice hockey-based rogue-lite called Tape to Tape, developed by Excellent Rectangle. In its first week, 34,020 units of the game were sold. Null Games states on its website that it will not “publish mobile games or games with gambling, loot boxes, or any other player-hostile behavior.”

=== Speaking Engagements ===
Wanstrath was a speaker at NASA’s open source summit. He has given keynote talks at the International RailsConf, Startup Riot Atlanta, Rails Summit Latin America, and different regional and international conferences. He gave the keynote addresses at the Esri Developer Summit in 2014, at the GitHub Universe Conference from 2015 to 2017 and the GitHub Satellite Conference in 2016 and 2017.
