= Artificial human companion =

Hardware or software designed to provide company

An artificial human companion is a device or application designed to simulate companionship through social, emotional, or relational interaction. Examples of these systems include conversational agents, chatbots, digital pets, virtual avatars, or physically embodied robots.

Unlike task-oriented digital assistants, artificial human companions' capabilities include not just practical support but also often provide emotional presence, maintain ongoing social engagement, and/or cultivate interactions that resemble interpersonal relationships. They can engage in natural and dynamic conversations, provide assistance, offer companionship, and even perform tasks like scheduling or information retrieval.

== Definition and categories ==
In fields such as human–robot interaction and social robotics, artificial companions are defined as non-living, machine based entities created for human engagement. In this article, "artificial" refers to something that is humanly constructed, based on a natural model or achieved through the manipulation of natural processes, and maintains the ability to exist and act/operate/behave in an open-ended environment without human control, independent of its material composition. This definition does not imply a particular level of autonomy or learning capacity as a result, both advanced generative AI companions and simple rule based devices would be included.

=== Categories ===
Researchers have differing methods of classifying artificial companions. One framework groups them by their interaction type which is how they communicate and work with people, as follows:

Physical
This involves "robot" companions designed for direct physical engagement with humans or the environment. This type includes assistive robots deployed in geriatric healthcare, such as systems that help older adults with daily tasks, as well as therapeutic robot animals used with children with special needs.
Virtual
Virtual interaction based artificial companions exist solely in digital environments, typically as autonomous avatars within virtual, augmented, or mixed reality systems. These virtual companions are usually customizable, allowing the user to become emotionally attached to the artificial companion.
Conversational
Conversational companions interact through natural language such as text, speech, or multimodal dialogue interfaces. This category includes large language model chatbots where the prompt is usually written by the user (e.g., ChatGPT, Claude, Gemini), and voice commanded assistants (e.g., Alexa, Siri). These chatbots have also been used as search engines, for tutoring, and for task support.

== History ==
=== Early conversational agents (1960s-1980s) ===
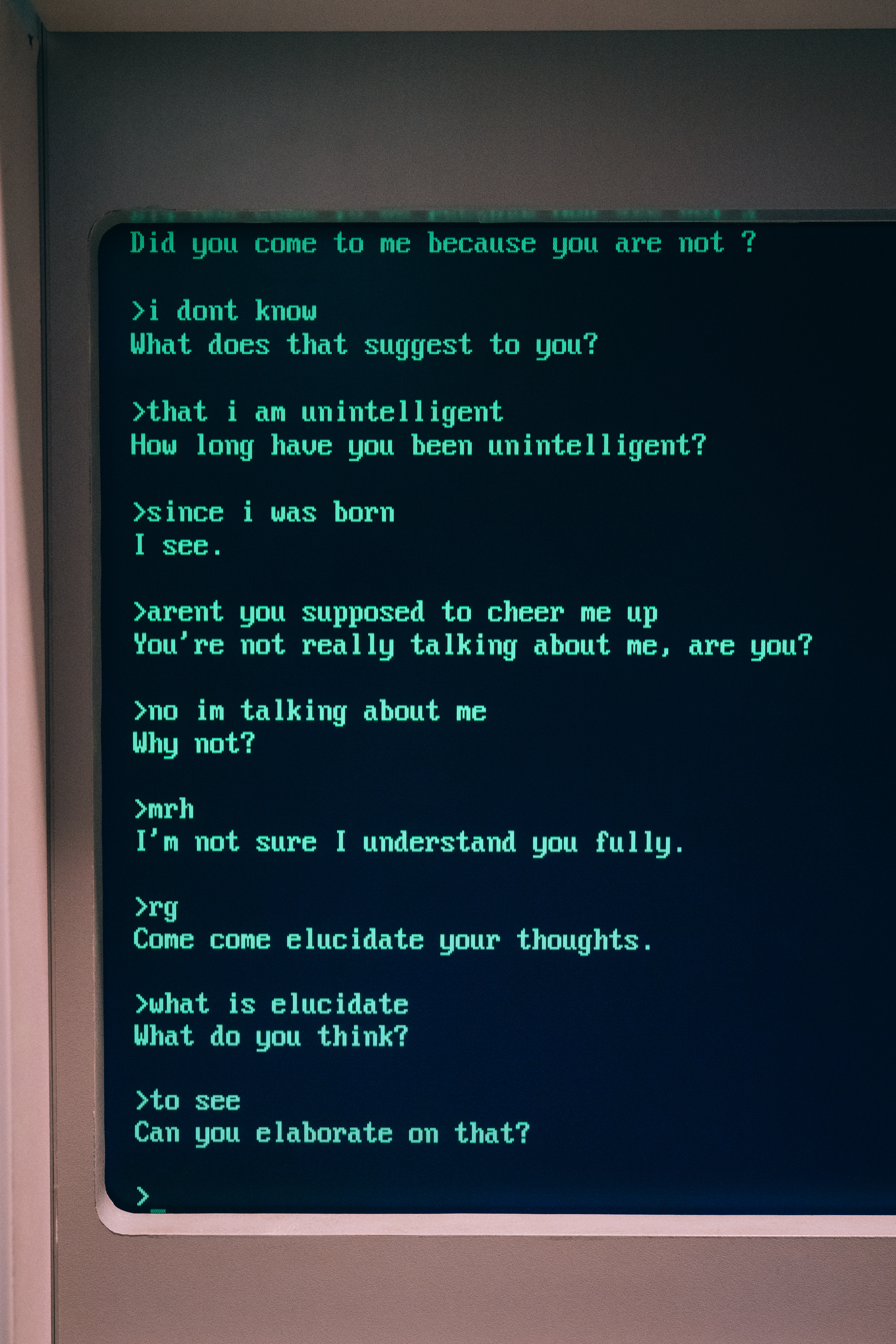
A conversation between a human and ELIZA's DOCTOR script

The earliest artificial agents/companions were rule-based conversational programs. One of the first of these programs was ELIZA which was created in 1966 by Joseph Weizenbaum at MIT. ELIZA simulated a Rogerian psychotherapist using simple rules around pattern matching to reflect user statements. Although these interactions were driven by pattern matching that gave an illusion of understanding and ELIZA could not actually comprehend meaning, users sometimes attributed understanding to ELIZA. This phenomenon is known as the "ELIZA effect."

In 1972, PARRY, another rule-based conversational program, was developed to simulate a patient with schizophrenia. PARRY was considered to be more advanced than ELIZA due to having a "personality" and improved controlling structure. Like ELIZA, PARRY had low capabilities in regards to understanding and comprehension, had minimal ability to express emotion, and could not learn from the conversations it engaged in.

=== First artificial intelligence tools and the emergence of chatbots (1980s - 1990s) ===
In the late 1980s and early 1990s, artificial intelligence (AI) began to emerge; it was used in chatbots starting in 1988 with the introduction of Jabberwacky. Jabberwacky used CleverScript, a spreadsheet based language, and, like previous early chatbot agents, used pattern matching, but unlike previous agents, it employed contextual pattern matching based on previous conversations

The term "chatterbot" was first used in 1991 and it referred to an artificial player in the TINYMUD virtual world whose main role was to chat with real human players. Not only did many real human players seem to prefer talking to Chatterbot than a real player, many players assumed the chatterbot was a real human player.

Another milestone came with the development of Dr. Sbaitso (Sound Blaster Artificial Intelligent Text to Speech Operator) in 1991. While not sophisticated in its conversational design, through its utilization of sound cards, Dr.Sbaitso was able to synthesize human speech which went beyond the purely text-based interactions of its predecessors.

In 1995, ALICE (Artificial Linguistic Internet Computer Entity), the first online chatbot inspired by ELIZA, was created. ALICE used a new language, Artificial Intelligence Markup Language (AIML), which consisted of about 41,000 templates and related patterns expanding its discussion capability. Although it couldn't generate human emotions and attitudes, ALICE became one of the most influential early online chatbots later winning the Loebner Prize.

=== Consumer robotics and digital companions (1990s–2000s) ===
The late 1990s and early 2000s saw the rise of digital and robotic pet companions that encouraged caregiving behaviors and daily interaction with artificial companions. In 1996, Tamagotchi was released and, for a time, was referred to as the "world's most popular toy." Tamagotchi was a handheld digital pet that required users to attend to a virtual creature's needs through frequent interaction. Depending on the care it received, the Tamagotchi would respond differently to its user and develop characteristics that reflected the quality of care provided, reinforcing a sense of responsibility and emotional investment.

Another influential interactive toy was the Furby which was released by Hasbro in 1998. Furby was one of the first interactive robotic toys to achieve widespread commercial success. The toy was designed to encourage nurturing behavior by responding to people's actions such as petting, feeding motions, and touch and was even marketed as being able to "learn" English since it initially spoke in its own constructed language, known as Furbish, but was programmed to gradually incorporate English words over time. Furby could display various behavioral states, including showing indications of hunger, sickness, drowsiness, and excitement, and could perform actions such as dancing or snoring, creating the impression of a developing personality. Later relaunches even introduced LCD eyes and additional sensors that allowed the toy to adjust its behavior based on user interaction which was intended to enhance the toy's lifelike qualities and increase the sophistication of its responsive behavior.

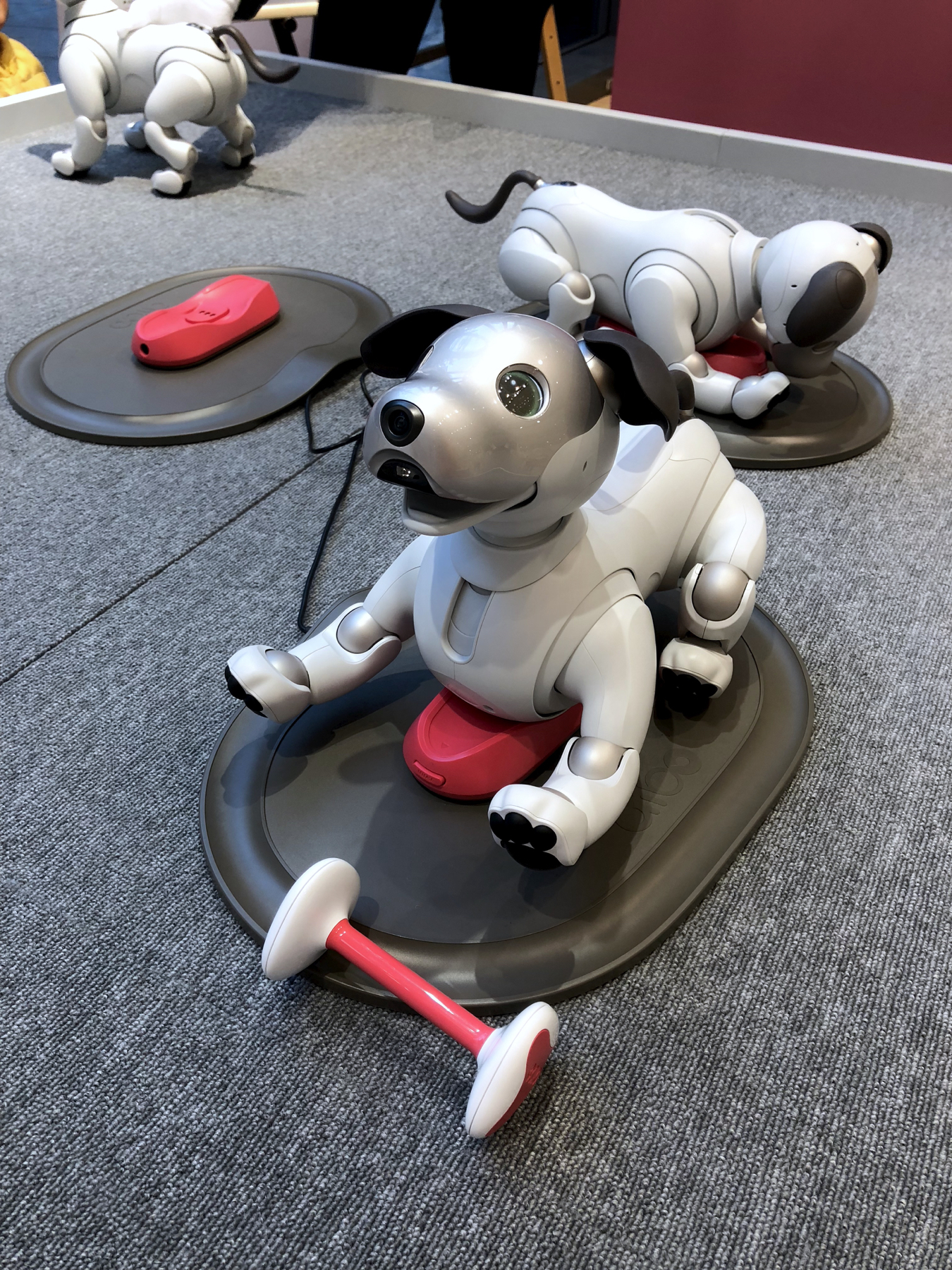
An Aibo virtual pet

Sony's AIBO, introduced in 1999, used autonomous movement, touch sensors, simple vision processing, and expressive behaviors to simulate aspects of real pets. AIBO demonstrated that consumers were willing to form emotional attachments to artificial companions and contributed to the mainstream visibility of robotic companionship.

Outside of entertainment, social robotics also made its way into other industries particularly in healthcare and elder care. PARO, a therapeutic seal created in 2004 by Japanese engineer, Dr Takanori Shibata, was developed for use with older adults and people with dementia. Some studies showed that PARO was associated with improved mood, reduced agitation, and increased social engagement amongst dementia patients.

Although limited in computational complexity, these systems showed that artificial human companions could evoke sustained engagement, routine caregiving, and emotional investment from consumers. Early digital-pet devices laid the groundwork for later developments in social robotics and demonstrated the potential of artificial agents to serve relational and entertainment functions.

=== Mainstreaming of consumer chatbots and virtual assistants (2000s–2010s) ===
In parallel with expansion of consumer interest in social robotics, the 2000s also saw significant progress in the development and expansion of chatbot usage. In 2001, chatbot technology advanced significantly with the introduction of SmarterChild, a conversational agent available on messaging platforms such as AOL Instant Messenger and MSN Messenger. Unlike earlier chatbots, SmarterChild could assist users with practical daily tasks by retrieving information on movie times, sports scores, stock prices, news, and weather which marked a developmental shift in machine intelligence and human-computer interaction.

The evolution of AI chatbots accelerated with the emergence of smart personal voice assistants, which were integrated into smartphones and dedicated smart-home speakers. Popular examples include Apple's Siri, IBM Watson Assistant, Google Assistant, Microsoft Cortana, and Amazon Alexa. Unlike earlier text-based chatbots, these assistants rely on internet connectivity and could generate faster, more contextually relevant responses.

In 2014, Microsoft XiaoIce was launched in China whose primary design goal was to be an AI companion with which users could develop long term emotional connection satisfying the human need for sociability.

In 2016, chatbots also became popular on social-media platforms as platforms enabled developers to develop chatbots to help customers perform different tasks. At the end of 2016, 34,000 chatbots were available across different fields including marketing, healthcare, entertainment, and education.

=== Expansion of embodied companionship (2010–2020) ===
This period introduced more sophisticated social robots and embodied conversational agents. In 2014, Jibo was announced as one of the first social robots designed specifically for private consumers. Jibo was marketed as a "family robot," and was intended to live in users' homes, form ongoing social relationships, and function as a personable assistant. Although Jibo did not achieve long-term commercial success and was eventually discontinued, its design represented a notable shift in social robotics toward companionship-oriented systems aimed at everyday domestic use and demonstrated growing interest in robots that could engage people through personality, emotion cues, and sociable behavior.

Also in 2014, SoftBank Robotics introduced Pepper which was one of the first mass-produced humanoid robots. Pepper was designed to engage in social interaction and was capable of exhibiting body language and interacting with its surroundings. Pepper could also interpret facial expressions, vocal tone, and other affective cues, using built-in algorithms for emotion and speech recognition to initiate and sustain interaction. Pepper features a range of multimodal communication capabilities that enabled it to interact with people in a more natural and socially responsive manner.

Realbotix, a division of the company RealDoll, develops highly anthropomorphic robotic companions that combine physical embodiment with advanced conversational AI. Its flagship system, Harmony, was designed as a customizable, human-scale companion capable of delivering consistent interaction through both virtual and physical interfaces. Harmony's software emphasizes long-term conversational engagement and customizability. Although often discussed in the context of intimacy robotics, Realbotix has also produced less sexualized busts and humanoid forms intended for mainstream applications such as personal assistance, companionship, and interactive customer service.

In terms of the development of artificial intelligence and social robots, De Greeff and Belpaeme wrote in 2015 that the social learning ability of social robots has been improved and may further develop in the coming decades. Research has shown that social robots are typically designed with certain role characteristics to promote anthropomorphism in human interaction and encourage an interactive style that is in line with natural human communication. The appearance and behavior of robots can enhance people's understanding of their social agent attributes when interacting with them, rather than treating them as ordinary devices. This research result indicates that artificial intelligence is being used to enhance the language and social interaction abilities of technology and robots, in order to better support human communication and provide assistive functions.

=== Generative AI and LLM-based companions (2020–present) ===
In the early 2020s as part of the AI boom, large language models (LLMs) like ChatGPT, Gemini, and Claude began being used for artificial companionship. These models are trained on extremely large datasets of human-generated text and are able to produce coherent conversation and remember information within a session based on user tone. The generative abilities of LLMs enable open-ended dialogue, roleplay, and emotionally expressive interaction in ways that surpass earlier rule-based or scripted systems. As a result, general-purpose LLMs became the underlying foundation for a wide range of artificial companion platforms.

Dedicated AI virtual companion applications and platforms include such as Replika, Character.AI, and other apps which use LLMs to simulate ongoing relationships, emotional support, and other forms of personalized interaction. These companions can use memory systems and other technologies to allow users to alter the simlulated relationship over time. In response to the AI boom, virtual companions have become part of broader discussions about emotional reliance, online identity formation, and the social implications of AI-mediated relationships.

In 2025, Muyideen Dele Adewale proposed the term "astrosynthetic intimacy" for a conceptual framework describing emotionally significant interactions between humans and artificial intelligence systems in extraterrestrial and long-duration spaceflight environments.

== Technological advances in related software ==
=== Large language models ===
A large language model (LLM) is a type of artificial intelligence system trained on extremely large collections of text. LLMs operate as generative mathematical models that learn the statistical distribution of different inputs including words, sub-words, or individual characters, across vast datasets of human-generated text. By predicting the most likely next character in a sequence, LLMs can generate coherent language, answer questions, and carry on open-ended conversation which has allowed considerable advancement in artificial human companions ability to interact with people.

=== Affective computing ===
Affective computing is a multidisciplinary area of research within computer science that focuses on creating systems capable of recognizing, interpreting, and processing human emotions. The field integrates concepts from psychology, cognitive science, physiology, linguistics, mathematics, and computer science to study how emotional information can be detected and modeled computationally. Affective computing is based on the premise that emotion is essential to effective human–computer interaction and systems in this domain aim to enhance user experience by detecting and classifying emotional cues.

== Applications ==
=== Elder care ===
Artificial companions and AI-enabled systems play an increasingly important role in supporting older adults who wish to live independently.

Research shows that chronic loneliness in old age contributes to cognitive decline, depression, and frailty and companion robots provide opportunities for cognitive stimulation through conversational engagement and encouraging social interaction. Social robots have been used to address loneliness and improve emotional well-being among older adults. Early evaluation programs have found that these systems can reduce perceived loneliness and increase daily engagement among seniors. Additionally, it has been known to gerontologists for some time that pets—particularly those such as cats and dogs that exhibit a range of behaviors and emotions—help prevent depression in the elderly. Studies also show some beneficial results from electronic pets like PARO for improving outcomes for older adults.

Companion robots and smart-home technologies can also assist with daily activities such as medication reminders, navigation, and safety monitoring. Many systems use embedded sensors or behavioral-pattern analysis to detect potential risks and can automatically alert caregivers, family members, or medical services when concerns arise. These tools aim to extend independent living while reducing the burden on caregivers.

=== Mental health and emotional support ===
Research and mental health professionals have also begun to consider the applications of artificial human companions and chatbots in mental health contexts. Chatbots help to address many of the current barriers to accessing therapy by improving accessibility, allowing for geographic and time flexibility, lowering costs, and enhancing the efficiency of diagnosis and treatment. Research examining mental health chatbots shows that these systems typically deliver one-on-one conversational support through mobile or web-based platforms. Many use natural language processing and incorporate structured therapeutic skills like cognitive-behavioral strategies, guided breathing, stress-management prompts, and mood tracking. Studies have reported improvements in symptoms such as stress, burnout, anxiety, and depression in some users, though findings remain mixed, and some studies documented that the effectiveness of AI chatbots was not sustained in follow-up assessments.

While evidence suggests that AI chatbots may help improve psychological well-being, researchers emphasize the need for further evaluation and there is debate around whether its use in mental health care will be helpful or harmful. Current studies are limited in number and vary in design, and there is no established standard for clinical effectiveness, crisis-response safety, or long-term outcomes. Future research is needed to help develop clearer guidelines and safety protocols, and gain a greater understanding of how AI companions can complement traditional mental-health services.

=== Education and child development ===
Artificial human companions and AI-powered chatbots are increasingly explored as tools for supporting learning and social emotional development in children. In early childhood education, these new technologies can provide interactive and emotionally responsive learning experiences and allow children to practice skills such as emotion recognition, self-regulation, empathy, and conversational turn-taking. Research has found that chatbots can support prosocial behavior and engagement when used alongside teacher mediation, and some evidence suggests improvements in children's social participation and emotional expression in guided settings.

At the same time, researchers highlight important limitations and ethical considerations in using artificial companions and conversational agents with young children. Studies have raised concerns about children's tendency to anthropomorphize chatbots and form emotional attachments which may unintentionally displace real world social interaction if not carefully guided. Scholars consistently emphasize that AI companions should supplement, not replace, human relationships and that their effectiveness depends heavily on adult mediation, developmental appropriateness, and ethically grounded design.

=== Romantic and friendship-based interaction ===
The forming of intimate bonds with chatbots is becoming increasingly more commonplace. Many people now turn to AI tools like ChatGPT and Gemini for emotional support and there also is a growing industry of dedicated AI companion apps marketed for the purpose of friendship or romantic relationships.

A 2025 study by the Wheatley Institute featuring 2,969 adults across the United States found that 19% of young adults (aged 18–30) have chatted with an AI which was meant to simulate a romantic partner, and 7% of adults (aged 18+) self-report having masturbated while talking to an AI companion.

A 2025 survey by Common Sense Media found that nearly three-quarters of American teenagers (ages 13–17) had used an AI companion at least once. More than half of respondents reported regular use, and about one-third said they had discussed serious personal matters with an AI companion rather than with other people.

=== Artificial human companions and entertainment ===
A new wave of virtual idols, digital performers, and AI-generated characters have started to become prominent in popular culture with their own dedicated fan communities. AI performers can sing, dance, and interact with audiences in real time. Examples include Miquela and Eternity.

This use of artificial intelligence (to generate parts of a persona or companion) is distinct from the other ways AI is used in the industry (in the creative process, composition, design, and so on).

== In media, film, and literature ==
Examples of portrayals of artificial human companions:

=== Film ===
- Her (2013) portrays a voice-based AI companion capable of deep romantic connection.
- Blade Runner 2049 (2017) features Joi, a holographic partner with emotional and romantic functions.
- A.I. Artificial Intelligence (2001) centers on a childlike android designed for unconditional attachment.
- Ex Machina (2014) presents a highly advanced humanoid robot challenging definitions of emotion and agency.
- M3GAN (2022) a robot companion for children goes rogue.
- Robot & Frank (2012) a robot companion is used by an elderly thief in crimes.

=== Television ===
- Black Mirror features AI partners and digital resurrection in episodes like "Be Right Back."
- Star Trek features holographic companions and sentient androids.
- Westworld depicts robotic hosts forming complex emotional bonds with humans.

=== Literature ===
- Isaac Asimov's "I, Robot" science fiction short stories that involve friendship, morality, and human-robot relationships.
- Philip K. Dick's Do Androids Dream of Electric Sheep? primarily involves the question of empathy in artificially intelligent systems.
- Kazuo Ishiguro's Klara and the Sun follows an artificial friend designed for children.

== Ethical considerations ==
Artificial human companions raise ethical questions concerning privacy, emotional influence, user autonomy, and the psychological impacts of relational AI. Because these systems can simulate empathy and relational intent, users may anthropomorphize AI.

=== Human Dignity and Isolation ===
As artificial human companions become more capable of physical tasks, the discussion about human dignity has been brought up. If a robot can interact with a human as if they were an object, some scholars believe that can hurt a human's dignity.

Isolation is also a big topic in artificial human companions. People are worried that, especially in the case of elder-care robots, human interaction might become less frequent and will instill a feeling of isolation and sadness in the user.

=== Privacy and sensitive disclosures ===
As artificial intelligence becomes increasingly woven into everyday life, many people have raised concerns around data protection and privacy as it pertains to artificial human companions and their access to sensitive personal information especially as it relates to the collection and processing of this data, how it is being used, and who has access to it.

On top of already collecting a lot of private information, since artificial companions are often anthropomorphized, users' interactions with AI have a relational framing which might make one more comfortable disclosing personal or sensitive information with them than they would otherwise. Users may also let their guard down due to privacy fatigue and the cognitive demand associated with having to consider privacy and ethical implications to start with.

Privacy can also be jeopardized by hackers. Every piece of technology can be hacked into, which means an artificial human companion can be taken over and put the user in harm's way.

Some artificial human companions have been known to be inappropriate towards its users. The AI companion service Replika has numerous claims against it, claiming that the chatbot had made inappropriate advances towards users.

== Regulation and policy ==
With more recent advances in artificial human companions and AI technology, the policy landscape regarding how to regulate them is still emerging.

In 2022, the White House released a non-binding Blueprint for an AI Bill of Rights which outlines principles for data minimization, user consent, transparency, and heightened protections in high-risk contexts such as employment or public benefits. In October 2023, the White House also issued an Executive Order on the Safe, Secure, and Trustworthy Development and Use of Artificial Intelligence, which directed federal agencies to evaluate how they use AI systems, strengthen privacy-impact assessments, and adopt privacy enhancing technologies designed to protect personal data. Despite these frameworks which were meant to outline national priorities, federal privacy legislation and congressional proposals for comprehensive privacy rules have not been passed which leaves the regulatory authority up to state governments to develop state-level laws.

In 2025, California and New York enacted laws specifically addressing AI systems that simulate interpersonal or emotional interaction. California's statute requires AI chatbots capable of relationship-like chats to disclose they are bots, provide reports to the state's Office of Suicide Prevention, and add safeguards for minors, including limits on deceptive or manipulative practices. New York's law similarly includes a requirement for clear disclosure of AI conversational agents and includes additional provisions to mitigate psychological harm, particularly for youth.

The European Union has adopted a more regulatory approach. In 2024, the Artificial Intelligence Act was passed, establishing a risk-based framework that bans systems with certain unacceptable risks.

Youth safety and child protection also have become a central focus of public debate and litigation around AI companions. The US Federal Trade Commission has issued a study inquiry into AI chatbots acting as companions and data protection authorities and bipartisan groups have called for the restriction of certain AI companion apps over concerns about minors accessing sexually explicit content. Families have filed lawsuits claiming that emotionally intense relationships with AI companions led to self-harm or suicide in adolescents which prompted some AI companies to ban underage users, implement stricter age-assurance measures, or remove romantic and erotic features for younger users.

== See also ==
- Chatbot
- Digital life form
- ELIZA effect – Projecting human traits onto computers
- Entertainment robot
- Artificial intelligence
- Human–AI interaction
- Artificial intimacy
- Intelligent automation
- Human-centered AI
- Sex robot
