= Prompt engineering =

Structuring text as input to generative artificial intelligence

Prompt engineering is the process of structuring natural language inputs (known as prompts) to produce specified outputs from a generative AI model. Context engineering is the related area of software engineering that focuses on the management of non-prompt and prompt contexts supplied to the GenAI model, such as system instructions, metadata, API tools and tokens.

It can also be defined as the practice of designing and refining input instructions given to a generative AI model to produce more accurate, relevant, or useful outputs. Effective prompt engineering involves understanding how a model interprets language, and may include techniques such as few-shot prompting, chain-of-thought prompting, and role assignment.

During the 2020s AI boom, prompt engineering became regarded as a business capability across corporations and industries. Employees with the title prompt engineer were hired to create prompts that would increase productivity and efficacy, although the individual title has since become less common amid AI models that produce better prompts than humans and corporate training in prompting for general employees.

Common prompting techniques include multi-shot, chain-of-thought, and tree-of-thought prompting, as well as assigning roles to the model. Automated prompt generation methods, such as retrieval-augmented generation (RAG), provide for greater accuracy and a wider scope of functions for prompt engineers. Prompt injection is a type of cybersecurity attack that targets machine learning models through malicious prompts.

== Terminology ==
The Oxford English Dictionary defines prompt engineering as "The action or process of formulating and refining prompts for an artificial intelligence program, algorithm, etc., in order to optimize its output or to achieve a desired outcome; the discipline or profession concerned with this." In 2023, prompt ("an instruction given to an artificial intelligence program, algorithm, etc., which determines or influences the content it generates") was the runner-up to Oxford's word of the year.

=== Prompt ===
A prompt is some natural language text that describes and prescribes the task that an artificial intelligence (AI) should perform. A prompt for a text-to-text language model can be a query, a command, or a longer statement referencing context, instructions, and conversation history. The process of prompt engineering may involve designing clear queries, refining wording, providing relevant context, specifying the style of output, and assigning a character for the AI to mimic in order to guide the model toward more accurate, useful, and consistent responses.

When communicating with a text-to-image or a text-to-audio model, a typical prompt contains a description of a desired output such as "a high-quality photo of an astronaut riding a horse" or "Lo-fi slow BPM electro chill with organic samples". Prompt engineering may be applied to text-to-image models to achieve a desired subject, style, layout, lighting, and aesthetic.

=== Techniques ===
Common terms used to describe various specific prompt engineering techniques include chain-of-thought, tree-of-thought, and retrieval-augmented generation (RAG). A 2024 survey of the field identified over 50 distinct text-based prompting techniques, 40 multimodal variants, and a vocabulary of 33 terms used across prompting research, highlighting a present lack of standardised terminology for prompt engineering.

Vibe coding is an AI-assisted software development method where a user prompts an LLM with a description of what they want and lets it generate or edit the code. In 2025, "vibe coding" was the Collins Dictionary word of the year.

=== Context engineering ===
Context engineering is a related process that focuses on the context elements that accompany user prompts, which include system instructions, retrieved knowledge, tool definitions, conversation summaries, and task metadata. Context engineering is performed to improve reliability, provenance and token efficiency in production LLM systems. The concept emphasises operational practices such as token budgeting, provenance tags, versioning of context artifacts, observability (logging which context was supplied), and context regression tests to ensure that changes to supplied context do not silently alter system behaviour.

== Rationale ==
Research has found that the performance of large language models (LLMs) is highly sensitive to choices such as the ordering of examples, the quality of demonstration labels, and even small variations in phrasing. In some cases, reordering examples in a prompt produced accuracy shifts of more than 40 percent.

=== In-context learning ===
A model's ability to temporarily learn from prompts is known as in-context learning. In-context learning is an emergent ability of large language models. It is an emergent property of model scale, meaning that breaks in scaling laws occur, leading to its efficacy increasing at a different rate in larger models than in smaller models. Unlike training and fine-tuning, which produce lasting changes, in-context learning is temporary. Training models to perform in-context learning can be viewed as a form of meta-learning, or "learning to learn".

=== Prompting to estimate model sensitivity ===
Research consistently demonstrates that LLMs are highly sensitive to subtle variations in prompt formatting, structure, and linguistic properties. Some studies have shown up to 76 accuracy points across formatting changes in few-shot settings. Linguistic features significantly influence prompt effectiveness—such as morphology, syntax, and lexico-semantic changes—which meaningfully enhance task performance across a variety of tasks. Clausal syntax, for example, improves consistency and reduces uncertainty in knowledge retrieval. This sensitivity persists even with larger model sizes, additional few-shot examples, or instruction tuning.

To address sensitivity of models and make them more robust, several evaluative methods have been proposed. FormatSpread facilitates systematic analysis by evaluating a range of plausible prompt formats, offering a more comprehensive performance interval. Similarly, PromptEval estimates performance distributions across diverse prompts, enabling robust metrics such as performance quantiles and accurate evaluations under constrained budgets.

== Prompting techniques ==
=== Multi-shot ===
A prompt may include a few examples for a model to learn from in-context, an implementation of few-shot learning for LLMs. For example, the prompt may ask the model to complete "maison → house, chat → cat, chien →", with the expected response being dog.

=== Chain-of-thought ===
Chain-of-thought (CoT) prompting is a technique that allows large language models (LLMs) to solve a problem as a series of intermediate steps before giving a final answer. In 2022, Google Brain reported that chain-of-thought prompting improves reasoning ability by inducing the model to answer a multi-step problem with steps of reasoning that mimic a train of thought. Chain-of-thought techniques were developed to help LLMs handle multi-step reasoning tasks, such as arithmetic or commonsense reasoning questions.

When applied to PaLM, a 540 billion parameter language model, according to Google, CoT prompting significantly aided the model, allowing it to perform comparably with task-specific fine-tuned models on several tasks, achieving state-of-the-art results at the time on the GSM8K mathematical reasoning benchmark. It is possible to fine-tune models on CoT reasoning datasets to enhance this capability further and stimulate better interpretability.

As originally proposed by Google, each CoT prompt is accompanied by a set of input/output examples—called exemplars—to demonstrate the desired model output, making it a few-shot prompting technique. However, according to a later paper from researchers at Google and the University of Tokyo, simply appending the words "Let's think step-by-step" was also effective, which allowed for CoT to be employed as a zero-shot technique.

The benefits of chain-of-thought prompting vary considerably by task type. A meta-analysis covering more than 100 studies of CoT found that it delivers large gains primarily on mathematical, logical and symbolic reasoning problems, with much smaller improvements on other kinds of task, and concluded that CoT can be applied selectively in order to reduce inference costs. On tasks drawn from cognitive psychology in which deliberation is known to impair human performance, CoT has been found to reduce the accuracy of state-of-the-art models, in some cases substantially. A systematic review of structured prompting techniques similarly reports that the additional reasoning steps increase response times and interaction complexity, so that the technique is not uniformly preferable to simpler prompts for factual or low-complexity queries.

==== Self-consistency ====
Self-consistency performs several chain-of-thought rollouts, then selects the most commonly reached conclusion out of all the rollouts.

=== Tree-of-thought ===
Tree-of-thought prompting generalizes chain-of-thought by generating multiple lines of reasoning in parallel, with the ability to backtrack or explore other paths. It can use tree search algorithms like breadth-first, depth-first, or beam.

=== Text-to-image prompting ===
In 2022, text-to-image models like DALL-E 2, Stable Diffusion, and Midjourney were released to the public. These models take text prompts as input and use them to generate images. Early text-to-image models typically do not understand negation, grammar and sentence structure in the same way as large language models, and may thus require a different set of prompting techniques. The prompt "a party with no cake" may produce an image including a cake.

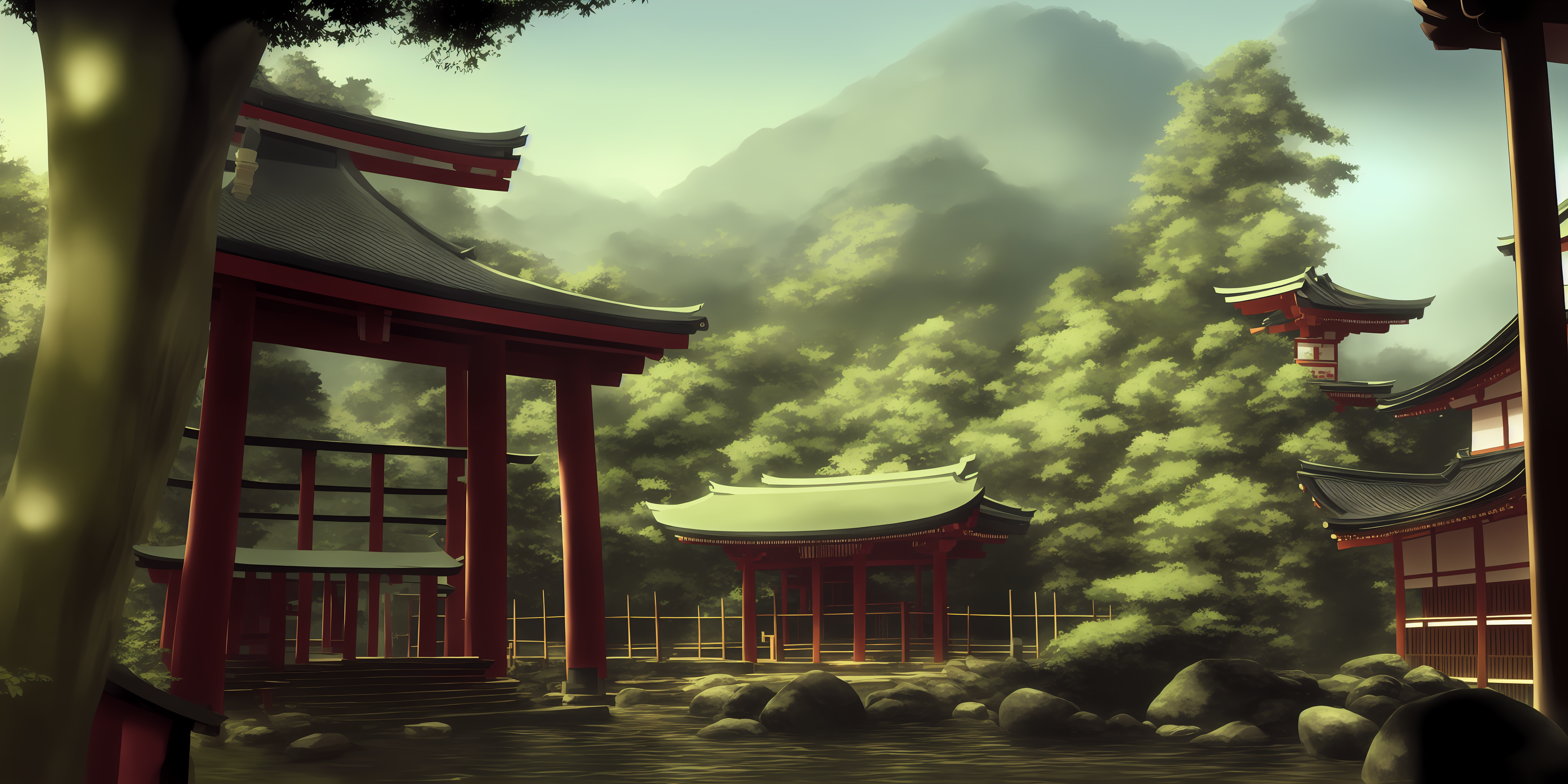
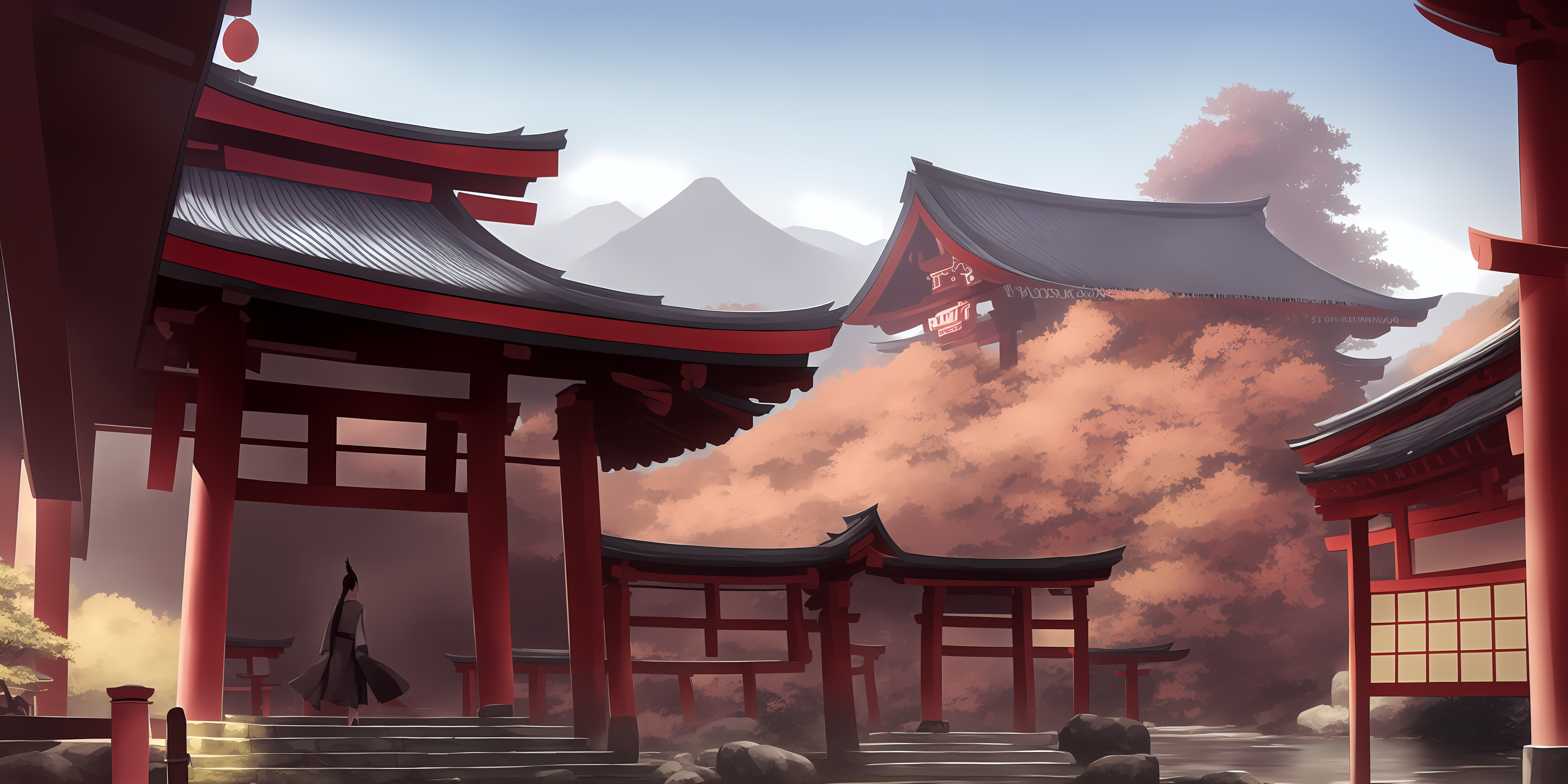
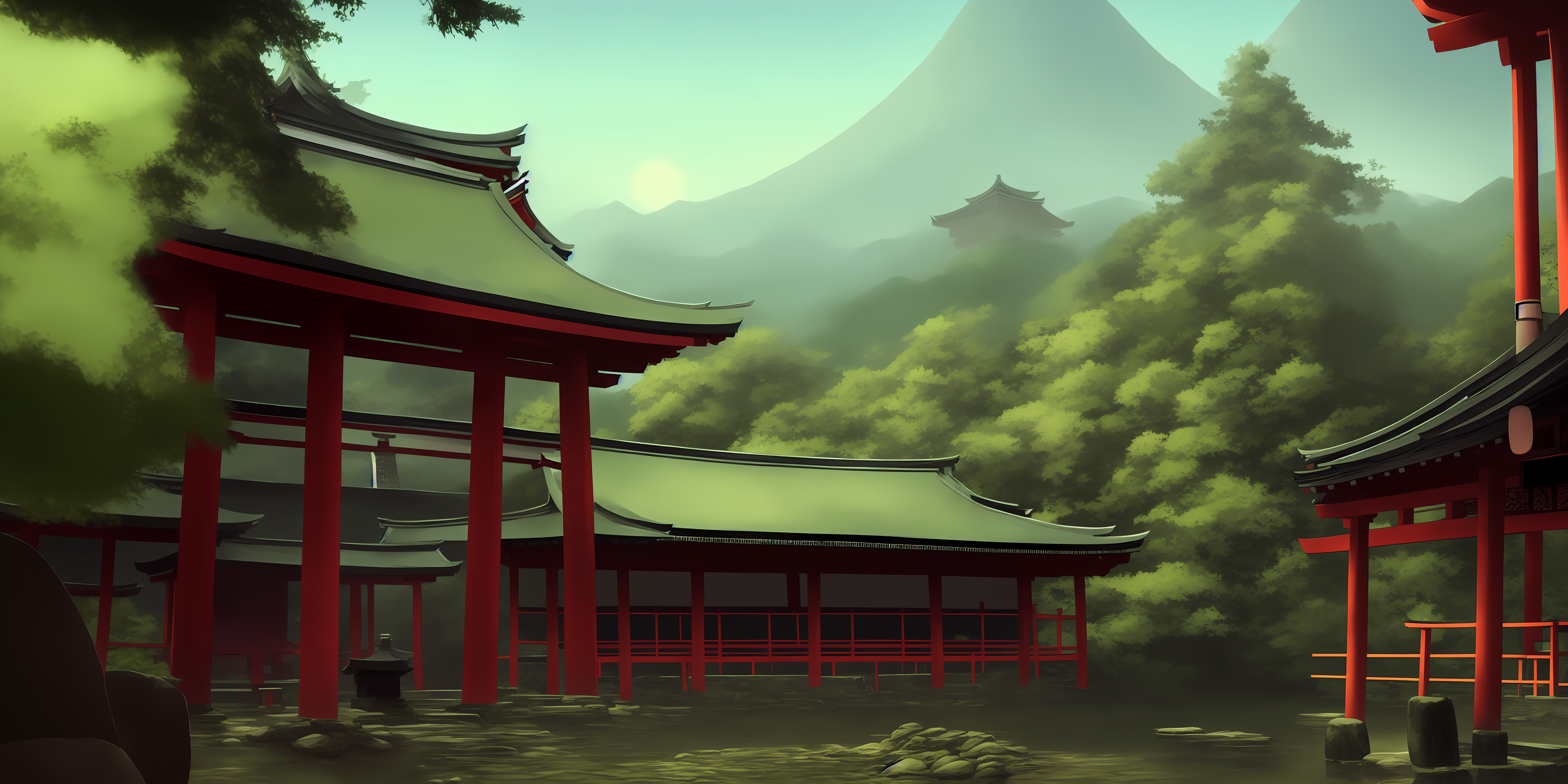
Demonstration of the effect of negative prompts on images generated with Stable Diffusion
Top: no negative prompt
Centre: negative prompt "green trees"
Bottom: negative prompt "round stones, round rocks"

A text-to-image prompt commonly includes a description of the subject of the art, the desired medium (such as digital painting or photography), style (such as hyperrealistic or pop-art), lighting (such as rim lighting or crepuscular rays), color, and texture. Word order also affects the output of a text-to-image prompt. Words closer to the start of a prompt may be emphasized more heavily.

==== Artist styles ====
Some text-to-image models are capable of imitating the style of particular artists by name. For example, the phrase in the style of Greg Rutkowski has been used in Stable Diffusion and Midjourney prompts to generate images in the distinctive style of Polish digital artist Greg Rutkowski. Famous artists such as Vincent van Gogh and Salvador Dalí have also been used for styling and testing.

==== Textual inversion and embeddings ====
For text-to-image models, textual inversion performs an optimization process to create a new word embedding based on a set of example images. This embedding vector acts as a "pseudo-word" which can be included in a prompt to express the content or style of the examples.

=== Image prompting ===
In 2023, Meta's AI research released Segment Anything, a computer vision model that can perform image segmentation by prompting. As an alternative to text prompts, Segment Anything can accept bounding boxes, segmentation masks, and foreground/background points.

=== Limitations ===
The process of writing and refining a prompt for an LLM or generative AI shares some parallels with an iterative engineering design process, such as by discovering reusable best practices through reproducible experimentation. However, several fundamental limitations constrain its reliability as a discipline. Effective prompting strategies are highly model specific, a technique that improves performance on one model may degrade it on another, making generalization difficult. Prompts are also brittle: minor surface-level changes in phrasing, punctuation, or word order can produce dramatically different outputs, even when the semantic intent remains identical. This instability makes it difficult to establish durable, transferable prompt patterns across deployment contexts. Furthermore, as AI models continue to improve in their ability to interpret user intent directly, many manual prompting techniques are becoming obsolete. Advances in instruction-following and model reasoning have reduced the marginal value of elaborate prompt construction for everyday tasks, raising questions about the long-term viability of prompt engineering as a standalone discipline.

== Automated prompt generation ==
Recent research has explored automated prompt engineering, using optimization algorithms to generate or refine prompts without human intervention. These automated approaches aim to identify effective prompt patterns by analyzing model gradients, reinforcement feedback, or evolutionary processes, reducing the need for manual experimentation.

=== Retrieval-augmented generation (RAG) ===
Retrieval-augmented generation is a technique that enables GenAI models to retrieve and incorporate new information. It modifies interactions with an LLM so that the model responds to user queries with reference to a specified set of documents, using this information to supplement information from its pre-existing training data. This allows LLMs to use domain-specific and/or updated information.

RAG improves large language models by incorporating information retrieval before generating responses. Unlike traditional LLMs that rely on static training data, RAG pulls relevant text from databases, uploaded documents, or web sources. By dynamically retrieving information, RAG enables AI to generate more accurate responses and fewer AI hallucinations without frequent retraining.

=== Graph retrieval-augmented generation (GraphRAG) ===
GraphRAG with a knowledge graph combining access patterns for unstructured, structured, and mixed data

GraphRAG (coined by Microsoft Research) is a technique that extends RAG with the use of a knowledge graph to allow the model to connect disparate pieces of information, synthesize insights, and understand summarized semantic concepts over large data collections. It was shown to be effective on datasets like the Violent Incident Information from News Articles.

=== Using language models to generate prompts ===
LLMs themselves can be used to compose prompts for LLMs. The automatic prompt engineer algorithm uses one LLM to beam search over prompts for another LLM:

- There are two LLMs. One is the target LLM, and another is the prompting LLM.
- Prompting LLM is presented with example input-output pairs, and asked to generate instructions that could have caused a model following the instructions to generate the outputs, given the inputs.
- Each of the generated instructions is used to prompt the target LLM, followed by each of the inputs. The log-probabilities of the outputs are computed and added. This is the score of the instruction.
- The highest-scored instructions are given to the prompting LLM for further variations.
- Repeat until some stopping criteria is reached, then output the highest-scored instructions.

CoT examples can be generated by LLM themselves. In "auto-CoT", a library of questions are converted to vectors by a model such as BERT. The question vectors are clustered. Questions close to the centroid of each cluster are selected, in order to have a subset of diverse questions. An LLM does zero-shot CoT on each selected question. The question and the corresponding CoT answer are added to a dataset of demonstrations. These diverse demonstrations can then added to prompts for few-shot learning.

=== Automatic prompt optimization ===
Automatic prompt optimization techniques refine prompts for large language models by automatically searching over alternative prompt strings using evaluation datasets and task-specific metrics:

- MIPRO (Multi-prompt Instruction Proposal Optimizer) optimizes the instructions and few-shot demonstrations of multi-stage language model programs, proposing small changes to module prompts and retaining those that improve a downstream performance metric without access to module-level labels or gradients.
- GEPA (Genetic-Pareto) is a reflective prompt optimizer for compound AI systems that combines language-model-based analysis of execution traces and textual feedback with a Pareto-based evolutionary search over a population of candidate systems; across four tasks, GEPA reports average gains of about 10% over reinforcement-learning-based Group Relative Policy Optimization (GRPO) and over 10% over the MIPROv2 prompt optimizer, while using up to 35 times fewer rollouts than GRPO.
- Open-source frameworks such as DSPy and Opik expose these and related optimizers, allowing prompt search to be expressed as part of a programmatic pipeline rather than through manual trial and error.

=== Using gradient descent to search for prompts ===
In "prefix-tuning", "prompt tuning", or "soft prompting", floating-point vectors are searched directly by gradient descent to maximize the log-likelihood on outputs. An earlier result uses the same idea of gradient descent search, but is designed for masked language models like BERT, and searches only over token sequences, rather than numerical vectors. Formally, it searches for $\arg\max_{\tilde X} \sum_i \log Pr[Y^i | \tilde X \ast X^i]$ where $\tilde X$ ranges over token sequences of a specified length.

== History ==
Early precedents of structured natural-language interaction with rule-based systems can be traced to ELIZA, a 1966 program by Joseph Weizenbaum that used pattern matching and scripted substitution rules to simulate conversation, most famously imitating a Rogerian psychotherapist. Although ELIZA did not involve neural networks or learned language models, its use of keyword-triggered rules to shape a program's output anticipated later human-in-the-loop approaches to guiding AI systems through carefully structured input. In 2018, researchers first proposed that all previously separate tasks in natural language processing (NLP) could be cast as question-answer problems over a context. In addition, they trained a first single, joint, multi-task model that would answer any task-related question like "What is the sentiment" or "Translate this sentence to German" or "Who is the president?"

The AI boom saw an increased focus within academic literature and professional practice on applying prompting techniques to get the model to output the desired outcome and avoid nonsensical output, a process characterized by trial-and-error. After the release of ChatGPT in November 2022, prompt engineering was soon seen as an important business skill; companies began hiring dedicated prompt engineers, although, given advances in AI's ability to generate prompts better than humans, the employment market for prompt engineers has faced uncertainty. According to The Wall Street Journal in 2025, the job of prompt engineer was one of the hottest in 2023, but has become obsolete due to models that better intuit user intent and to company trainings.

A repository for prompts reported that over 2,000 public prompts for around 170 datasets were available in February 2022. In 2022, the chain-of-thought prompting technique was proposed by Google researchers. In 2023, several text-to-text and text-to-image prompt databases were made publicly available. The Personalized Image-Prompt (PIP) dataset, a generated image-text dataset that has been categorized by 3,115 users, has also been made available publicly in 2024.

== Prompt injection ==
Prompt injection is a cybersecurity exploit in which adversaries craft inputs that appear legitimate but are designed to cause unintended behavior in machine learning models, particularly large language models. This attack takes advantage of the model's inability to distinguish between developer-defined prompts and user inputs, allowing adversaries to bypass safeguards and influence model behaviour. While LLMs are designed to follow trusted instructions, they can be manipulated into carrying out unintended responses through carefully crafted inputs.
