= ELIZA effect =

Projecting human traits onto computers

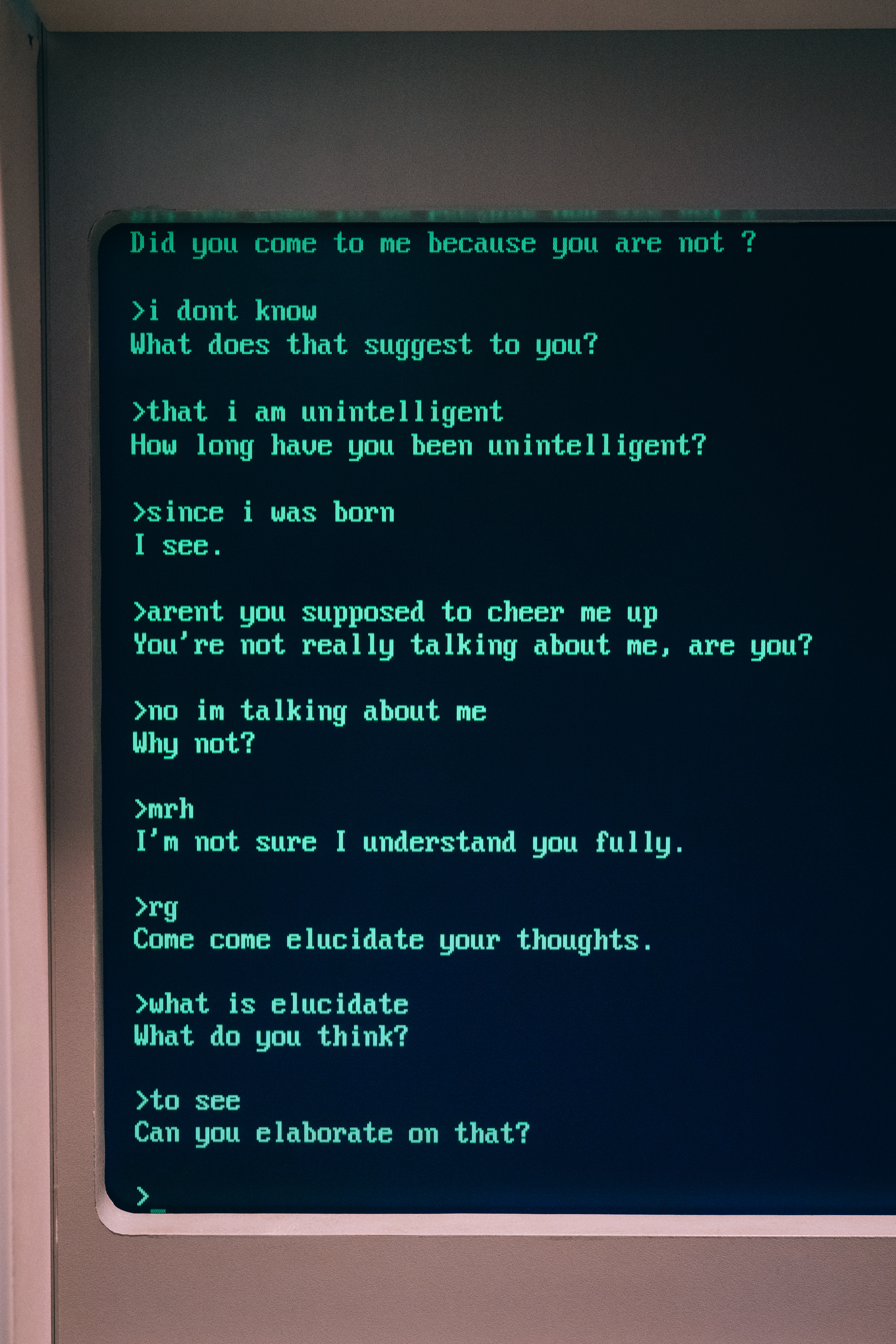
A conversation with ELIZA

In computer science, the ELIZA effect is a claimed tendency to project human traits—such as experience, semantic comprehension or empathy—onto rudimentary computer programs. ELIZA was a symbolic AI chatbot developed in 1966 by Joseph Weizenbaum that imitated a psychotherapist. Many early users were supposedly convinced of ELIZA's intelligence and understanding, despite its basic text-processing approach and the explanations of its limitations.

== History ==
In the 19th century, the tendency to understand mechanical operations in psychological terms was already noted by Charles Babbage. In proposing what would later be called a carry-lookahead adder, Babbage remarked that he found such terms convenient for descriptive purposes, even though nothing more than mechanical action was meant.

In 1966, a chatbot named ELIZA was developed by MIT computer scientist Joseph Weizenbaum. When executing Weizenbaum's DOCTOR script, ELIZA simulated a Rogerian psychotherapist, largely by rephrasing the "patient"'s replies as questions:

Human: "Well, my boyfriend made me come here."
ELIZA: "Your boyfriend made you come here?"
Human: "He says I'm depressed much of the time."
ELIZA: "I am sorry to hear you are depressed."
Human: "It's true. I'm unhappy."
ELIZA: "Do you think coming here will help you not to be unhappy?"

Though designed strictly as a mechanism to support "natural language conversation" with a computer, according to Weizenbaum, ELIZA's DOCTOR script was surprisingly successful in eliciting emotional responses from users who, in the course of interacting with the program, began to ascribe understanding and motivation to the program's output. As Weizenbaum later wrote, "I had not realized ... that extremely short exposures to a relatively simple computer program could induce powerful delusional thinking in quite normal people." Indeed, ELIZA's code had not been designed to evoke this reaction in the first place. Weizenbaum interpreted users as unconsciously assuming that ELIZA's questions implied interest and emotional involvement in the topics discussed, even when they consciously knew that ELIZA did not simulate emotion.

Over time, Weizenbaum became a staunch proponent of the notion that ELIZA had been deceiving users into thinking it was more than it was and creating powerful emotional bonds. While ELIZA / DOCTOR raised for many the prospect of automated psychotherapy available to all (including noted astronomer Carl Sagan, who imagined a network of computer psychotherapeutic terminals), Weizenbaum was repulsed by the "obscene idea" of computerized psychotherapy, which he detested. In the small, parochial research community, Weizenbaum found the rupture over the issue to be very personal, and feuded with his colleagues (AI pioneer John McCarthy called his stance "moralistic and incoherent” and accused Weizenbaum of adopting a "more-human-than-thou" attitude). Weizenbaum's political views were also charged by the use of computers for bombing target selection during the Vietnam War, with target selectors having no clue why a given hamlet was being selected beyond "the computer says so". For Weizenbaum, the notion that his program was harmfully deceiving people into believing it was more intelligent and human than it was became a key argument against an uncontrolled proliferation of AI into daily life.

== Characteristics ==
In its specific form, the ELIZA effect refers only to "the susceptibility of people to read far more understanding than is warranted into strings of symbols—especially words—strung together by computers". A trivial example of the specific form of the Eliza effect, given by Douglas Hofstadter, involves an automated teller machine which displays the words "THANK YOU" at the end of a transaction. A naive observer might think that the machine is actually expressing gratitude; however, the machine is only printing a preprogrammed string of symbols.

More generally, the ELIZA effect describes any situation where, based solely on a system's output, users perceive computer systems as having "intrinsic qualities and abilities which the software controlling the (output) cannot possibly achieve" or "assume that [outputs] reflect a greater causality than they actually do". In both its specific and general forms, the ELIZA effect is notable for occurring even when users of the system are aware of the determinate nature of output produced by the system.

From a psychological standpoint, the ELIZA effect is the result of a subtle cognitive dissonance between the user's awareness of programming limitations and their behavior towards the output of the program.

== Significance ==
The ELIZA effect has been argued to be an important development in artificial intelligence, demonstrating the principle of using social engineering rather than explicit programming to pass a Turing test.

ELIZA supposedly convinced some users into thinking that a machine was human. This marked a shift in human-machine interaction, wherein technologies were programmed to imitate human behavior. Two groups of chatbots are distinguished by William Meisel as "general personal assistants" and "specialized digital assistants". General digital assistants have been integrated into personal devices, with skills like sending messages, taking notes, checking calendars, and setting appointments. Specialized digital assistants "operate in very specific domains or help with very specific tasks". Weizenbaum considered that not every part of the human thought could be reduced to logical formalisms and that "there are some acts of thought that ought to be attempted only by humans".

== Critique ==
=== Interpretation as 'play' ===
Noah Wardrip-Fruin, professor of Computational Media at the University of California, has argued that the illusion initially presented by ELIZA is paper-thin, and rather than the ELIZA effect involving the human being "deceived" into accepting the humanity of the software, prolonged interactions typically devolve into play. Users typically adopt one of two approaches: either deliberately trying to get the bot to say ridiculous things, or to try to help the bot stay coherent. In effect, the user role-plays a "digital fiction" with the bot – that is, a willful suspension of disbelief, similar to that of a media experience.

Sociologist Sherry Turkle, who popularized the term "ELIZA effect", also noted this phenomenon, writing: "Some people embark on an all-out effort to 'psych out' the program, to understand its structure in order to trick it and expose it as a 'mere machine'. Many more do the opposite... They didn’t ask questions that they knew would 'confuse' the program, that would make it 'talk nonsense'." She attributed this to a desire to "maintain the illusion that Eliza was able to respond to them."

=== Misinterpreting humanity as delusion ===
In an interview with Roman Mars and Delaney Hall, Weizenbaum's daughter, Miriam Weizenbaum, had much positive to say about her father, but criticized his story about his secretary being tricked by ELIZA:

I always heard that just really kind of soaked in arrogance. Like, how could she be so stupid to think that this is actually a meaningful communication? Here you have somebody who so needs a landing pad for her feelings that she’s willing to embrace it, right? And he totally misses that, he totally misses the human need and instead speaks of just evidence of this person’s stupidity rather than evidence of their humanity.

== See also ==
- AI anthropomorphism – Attribution of human traits to AI
- Automation bias – Propensity for humans to favor suggestions from automated decision-making systems
- Chatbot psychosis – Psychological phenomenon
- Chinese room – Thought experiment on artificial intelligence
- Cold reading – Set of techniques used by mentalists, psychics, fortune-tellers, and mediums
- Duck test – Classification based on observable evidence
- Intentional stance – Philosophical concept
- Loebner Prize – Annual AI competition
- Philosophical zombie – Thought experiment in philosophy
- Uncanny valley – Hypothesis that human replicas elicit revulsion
