= Weizenbaum Institute =

German research institute

Coordinates: 52.5082°N 13.3293°E

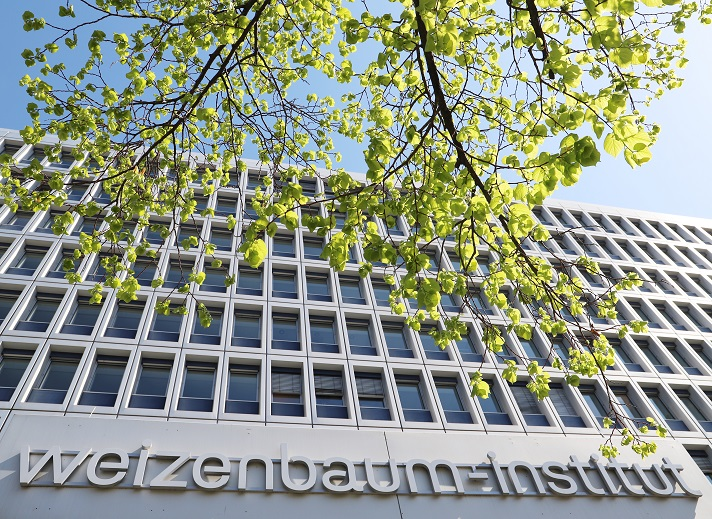
Weizenbaum Institute building façade and logo, Berlin

The Weizenbaum Institute is a research institute for interdisciplinary digitalization research. It is a joint project of research institutions from Berlin and Brandenburg, funded by the Federal Ministry of Education and Research. The partners are Free University of Berlin, Humboldt University of Berlin, Technische Universität Berlin, Berlin University of the Arts, University of Potsdam, Fraunhofer Institute for Open Communication Systems and WZB Berlin Social Science Center.

The Weizenbaum Institute was awarded the tender by the German Federal Ministry of Education and Research to host the German Internet Institute, hence it is also known by this name. Founded in 2017, the institute is located in Berlin. The institute is named after Joseph Weizenbaum.

== Research programme ==
The aim of the Weizenbaum Institute is to fill the need for research into the social impact of digitisation, in addition to the technical and legal issues it raises. Based on the research findings, options for action are developed for government, business and civil society.

During the five-year start-up phase of the institute (09/2017-09/2022), 21 research groups were assigned to four research areas.

In the current research period, the focus is on the following 4 areas:

- Digital technologies in society: between opportunities for participation and new inequalities
- Digital markets and public spheres on platforms: between the common good and economic imperatives
- Organization of knowledge: between openness and exclusivity
- Digital infrastructures in democracy: between security and freedom

== People ==
The founding directors are Prof. Dr. Martin Emmer, Prof. Dr. Axel Metzger, LL.M. (Harvard) and Prof. Dr.-Ing. Ina Schieferdecker.

== Funding ==
When the institute was established in 2017, it received a total of 50 million euro in funding from the federal government for its first funding phase of five years. In 2022, the Weizenbaum Institute is the recipient of 36 million euros in federal funding for the period until 2025.
