= Computer Power and Human Reason =

1976 book by Joseph Weizenbaum

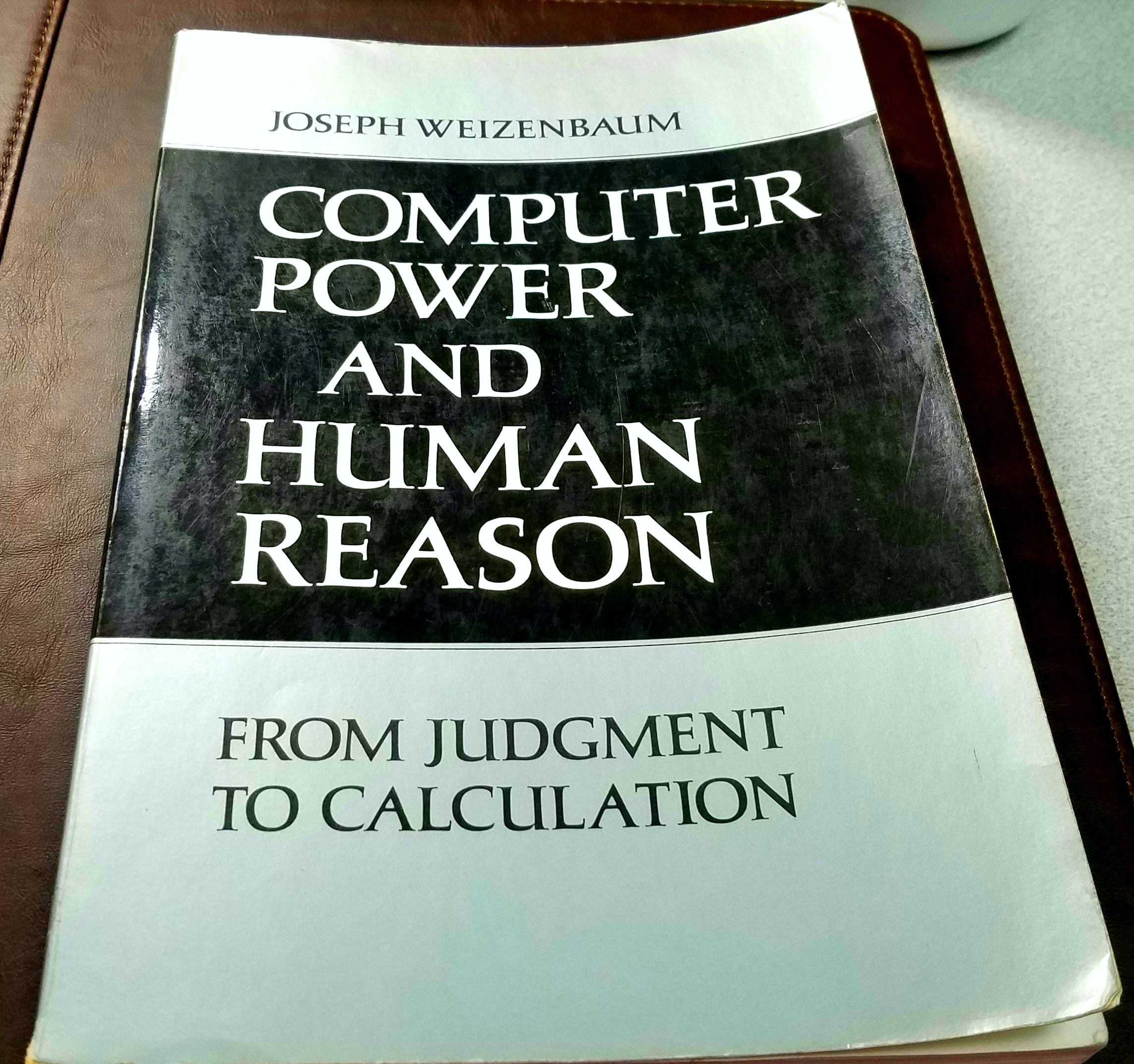
- Book cover
- Author: Joseph Weizenbaum
- Language: English
- Genre: Nonfiction
- Publisher: W. H. Freeman and Company
- Publication date: 1976
- Publication place: United States
- Media type: Print
- Pages: 300
- ISBN: 978-0716704645

Computer Power and Human Reason: From Judgment to Calculation is a 1976 nonfiction book by German-American computer scientist Joseph Weizenbaum in which he contends that while artificial intelligence may be possible, we should never allow computers to make important decisions, as they will always lack human qualities such as compassion and wisdom.

== Background ==
Before writing Computer Power and Human Reason, Weizenbaum had garnered significant attention for creating the ELIZA program, an early milestone in conversational computing. His firsthand observation of people attributing human-like qualities to a simple program prompted him to reflect more deeply on society's readiness to entrust moral and ethical considerations to machines.

== Reception and legacy ==
Computer Power and Human Reason sparked scholarly debate on the acceptable scope of AI applications, particularly in fields where human welfare and ethical considerations are paramount. Early academic reviews highlighted that Weizenbaum's stance pushed readers to recognize that even as computers grow more capable, they lack the intrinsic moral compass and empathy required for certain kinds of judgment.

The book caused disagreement with, and separation from, other members of the artificial intelligence research community, a status the author later said he'd come to take pride in.

== See also ==
- Ethics of artificial intelligence
- Criticism of technology
