= Plug & Pray =

2010 film by Jens Schanze

- Directed by: Jens Schanze
- Written by: Jens Schanze
- Produced by: Judith Malek-Mahdavi; Jens Schanze
- Starring: Joseph Weizenbaum; Raymond Kurzweil; Hiroshi Ishiguro; Minoru Asada; Giorgio Metta; Neil Gershenfeld; Joel Moses; H.-J. Wuensche
- Cinematography: Boerres Weiffenbach
- Edited by: Jens Schanze; Joerg Hommer
- Music by: Rainer Bartesch
- Production company: Mascha Film
- Distributed by: United Docs
- Release dates: April 18, 2010 (Visions du Réel); November 11, 2010 (Germany)
- Running time: 91 minutes
- Country: Germany
- Language: English

Plug & Pray is a 2010 documentary film about the promise, problems and ethics of artificial intelligence and robotics. The main protagonists are the former MIT professor Joseph Weizenbaum and the futurist Raymond Kurzweil. The title is a pun on the computer hardware phrase "Plug and Play".

== Synopsis ==
Computer experts around the world strive towards the development of intelligent robots. Pioneers like Raymond Kurzweil and Hiroshi Ishiguro dream of fashioning intelligent machines that will equal their human creators. In this potential reality, man and machine merge as a single unity. Rejecting evolution's biological shackles tantalisingly dangles the promise of eternal life for those bold enough to seize it. But others, like Joseph Weizenbaum, counterattack against society's limitless faith in the redemptive powers of technology, questioning the prevailing discourses on new technologies and their ethical relationships to human life. The film delves into a world where computer technology, robotics, biology, neuroscience, and developmental psychology merge, and features roboticists in their laboratories in Japan, the US, Italy and Germany.

== Background ==
Since antiquity, mankind has dreamed of creating brilliant machines. The invention of the computer and the breathtaking pace of technological progress appear to be bringing the realisation of this dream within the grasp of humans. Robots were to do the housework, look after the children, care for the elderly, and go to war. Former MIT professor Joseph Weizenbaum, creator of ELIZA, has become a harsh critic of their visions of technological omnipotence.

Production of the film started in 2006 and ended in 2009. The death of the main protagonist Joseph Weizenbaum on March 5, 2008, fell in this period. The international festival premiere was at FIPA 2010 in Biarritz, France. Since then the film has been invited to 27 film festivals, among them the Seattle International Film Festival, Vancouver Film Festival, Visions du Réel. The theatrical release in Germany was on Nov. 11, 2010.

== Awards ==
The film won the Bavarian Film Award 2010 for "Best Documentary", the Grand Prix of the Jury for the best film at the Paris International Science Film Festival, the Primer Premio for best film at the Mostra de Ciencia e Cinema in La Coruña (Spain), and the Science Communication Award at the International Science Film Festival Athens. It was also chosen as the best international film at the 46th AFO, Science Documentary Festival in Olomouc, Czech Republic, in 2011.
