= Segment Anything =

Unified model for segmenting objects in images and videos

Segment Anything is a series of open-source computer vision foundation models developed by Meta AI (formerly Facebook AI Research, and later Meta Superintelligence Labs) for image and video segmentation. The project was introduced in April 2023 with the Segment Anything Model (SAM), a promptable segmentation model trained on the SA-1B dataset of over 1.1 billion masks, and has since been extended by SAM 2 (2024), which unified image and video segmentation, and SAM 3 (2025), which added segmentation from natural-language concept prompts. The models are released under the Apache 2.0 license and have been widely adopted in research and industry, including medical imaging, earth observation, robotics, and content editing tools.

== Background ==
Image segmentation—determining which pixels of an image belong to an object—had traditionally required models trained on task-specific datasets such as COCO, Cityscapes, or Pascal VOC, each with a fixed set of object categories. A model trained on one dataset generally failed to transfer to another. The Segment Anything project proposed to treat segmentation as a prompting problem, analogous to prompting in large language models: instead of classifying pixels into a closed vocabulary, the model produces a segmentation mask for whatever object the user indicates.

== SAM (2023) ==
Meta AI released the Segment Anything Model (SAM) on April 5, 2023, together with the SA-1B dataset. SAM is promptable: given an image and a prompt—a foreground point, a bounding box, or a rough mask—it outputs a valid segmentation mask for the indicated object, even for objects and image distributions not seen during training (zero-shot transfer). Its architecture pairs a heavyweight Vision Transformer image encoder with a lightweight prompt encoder and mask decoder, so that the expensive image encoding is computed once and the model can then respond to many prompts cheaply.

== SAM 2 (2024) ==
On July 29, 2024, Meta released SAM 2, which extended promptable segmentation to video. SAM 2 treats an image as a single-frame video, unifying image and video segmentation in one architecture. It replaced SAM's Vision Transformer encoder with a hierarchical Hiera backbone and added a streaming memory module—comprising a memory encoder, memory bank, and memory attention—that stores embeddings of past video frames so that objects can be tracked through occlusions. Frames are processed sequentially, enabling real-time operation: Meta reported approximately 44 frames per second on image segmentation.

== SAM 3 (2025) ==
On November 19, 2025, Meta released SAM 3, which introduced Promptable Concept Segmentation (PCS): the model can detect, segment, and track all instances of a concept specified by a short noun phrase (such as "yellow school bus"), an example image, or a combination of both, in addition to the geometric prompts (points, boxes, masks) supported by earlier versions.
