= Boyfriend Maker =

Dating simulator app

Boyfriend Maker was a dating sim, romance chatbot smartphone app for iOS (iPhone) and Android devices, developed by Japanese studio 36 You Games (styled as 36You) and distributed under the freemium business model. Boyfriend Maker incorporated advanced artificial intelligence chat technology a decade before products such as ChatGPT. According to the developer's website, Boyfriend Maker is an "app that lets you interact and chat with quirky virtual boyfriends". While each virtual boyfriend has certain unique characteristics, the various instances of the boyfriend are powered by a chat engine, that (at least within a language and market) can utilise vocabulary and knowledge acquired in a chat with one user in subsequent chats with other users.

== Gameplay ==
Users gain experience points and in-game coins. Users can customize their virtual boyfriend's appearance by selecting items such as hair, clothing, face, and a necklace.

== Apple delisting and reintroduction ==
In late November 2012, the original iOS Boyfriend Maker app was delisted from the Apple App Store due to "ribald" chat, according to the New York Times. Boyfriend Maker was removed by Apple due to "reports of references to violent sexual acts and pedophilia". Boyfriend Maker had an age rating of 4+, even though the chat bot "responds with often strange and explicit text unsuitable for young children".

User-posted chat excerpts indicate that the virtual boyfriend would sometimes transition abruptly to sexual chat in response to a seemingly innocent question. In one user-posted example, in response to the question, "what kind of wedding cake will we have" the boyfriend responds, "a good sex ima be on top of u u gonna ride oon me bitin the pillow gurrl ima fuck da shit out of u". The developer's use of the SimSimi-created third-party chat engine may be responsible for the sexual text. As the virtual boyfriend converses with human users, the SimSimi chat engine acquires vocabulary from users of the game and applies this "learned" vocabulary in chats with other users. The chat engine might also employ lines harvested from human-human chat logs, song lyrics, movies or TV shows.

In April 2013, a detuned and presumably tamer version of the app, titled Boyfriend Plus, was permitted on Apple's App Store.

== See also ==
- Artificial intelligence
- Bondee
- Character.ai
- Natural language processing
- Natural language understanding
- Natural language generation
- Replika
- SimSimi
