= Emily Darlington =

British politician

Emily Darlington MP
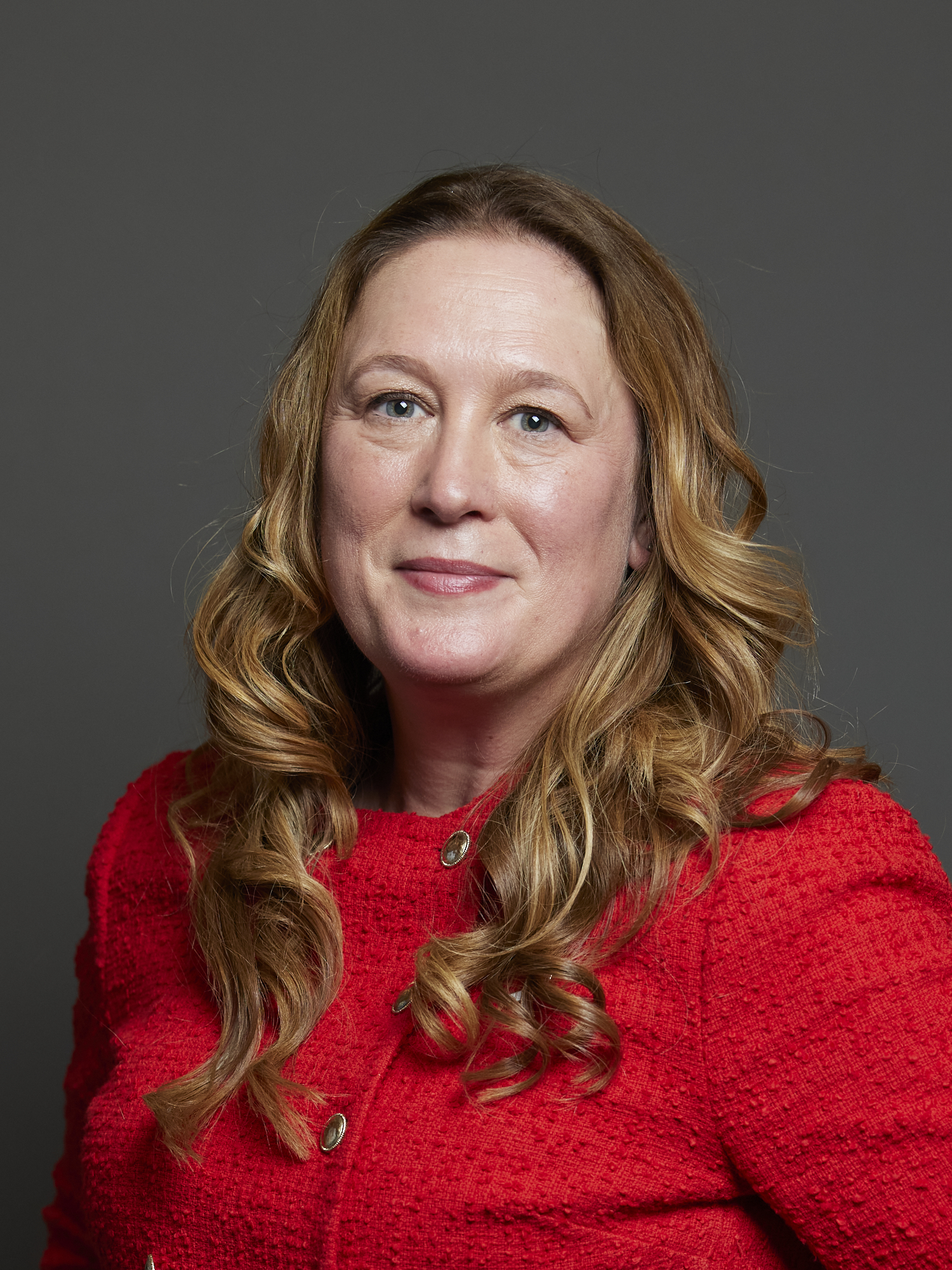
- Official portrait, 2024

Member of Parliament for Milton Keynes Central
- Incumbent
- Assumed office 4 July 2024
- Preceded by: Constituency established
- Majority: 7,291 (15.3%)

Personal details
- Born: London, England
- Party: Labour

Emily Catrin Darlington is a British Labour Party politician who has been Member of Parliament for Milton Keynes Central since 2024.

== Early life and career ==
Darlington was born at St Thomas' Hospital in London, England. She emigrated to Canada with her father when young, spending summers in south Wales. She returned to the United Kingdom in c. 2000.

She has worked in international development, including as a volunteer and board member of a Kenyan charity working to alleviate poverty.

She co-founded the strategic communications consultancy, Aequitas, which she stepped down from in 2013.

== Political career ==
In the 2015 general election, Darlington stood for Milton Keynes North, coming second. In 2018, she won a by-election for Milton Keynes Council and later became deputy leader of the Labour group.

She is part of the White Ribbon Campaign. In November 2026 it was announced that the British parliament would be the first to claim White Ribbon accreditation following a proposal by Darlington and others. New members of parliament would have their criminal records checked and it was proposed that they would receive training. The changes were backed by the Speaker Lindsay Hoyle.

== Technology and digital sovereignty ==
Darlington has been a prominent advocate for UK digital and technology sovereignty, arguing that dependence on foreign technology firms poses risks to national security and economic growth. In a Westminster Hall debate in March 2026, which she secured, she defined technology sovereignty as encompassing "UK ideas... UK inventors and it is UK based, but it is also about UK values," including adherence to domestic data protection laws and British Standards Institution (BSI) standards. She argued that growing technology monopolies were "buying up and squishing out UK inventions, growth and companies," and called for the government to invest in quantum technologies and to ensure UK firms win public sector contracts. Darlington raised specific concerns about the Ministry of Defence awarding contracts to Palantir, noting that the company's AI security expert had stated that "the market for military AI does not pause for ethics," and arguing that firms which feel they are too big to follow national law should not be trusted with government contracts. She also questioned the safety of relying on Elon Musk's Starlink satellite service for emergency communications, warning that it could be disabled by a hostile actor.

During the Second Reading of the Cyber Security and Resilience Bill in January 2026, Darlington argued that sovereign technology, which she defined as UK-owned intellectual property developed by companies paying UK taxes and accountable to UK law, is essential both for fighting cyber-crime and for building public confidence in digital services. She noted that in her constituency of Milton Keynes Central, one in three jobs are in the technology sector, making the area a significant centre for AI and tech services. Darlington criticised the award of a £330 million NHS data contract to Palantir, arguing that using a foreign firm with "questionable alliances" had eroded public and medical trust, thereby slowing the adoption of important health innovations. She called for the government to promote UK solutions such as Crown Hosting Data Centres, a public-private joint venture, across the public sector.

== Online safety ==
Darlington has campaigned extensively for stronger online safety regulations and child protection measures. As part of her ongoing online safety campaign, she surveyed over 500 14- to 16-year-olds in schools across her constituency in early 2026. The findings showed that 59% had been contacted by strangers online, 38% had seen explicit or age-inappropriate content, and 33% had been bullied or blackmailed on their phones. Describing the results as "pretty shocking," she argued that young people themselves were calling for further regulation, and that the problem was occurring particularly through platforms that adults might not recognise, such as Roblox. She presented the findings in a parliamentary debate on online harm in February 2026, cautioning against implementing a blanket ban on social media for under-16s, which she described as a "blunt tool" that raised "the flag of surrender to social media platforms." She argued that such a ban could isolate neurodivergent and LGBTQ+ young people who rely on online communities for support, and that children would simply migrate to less regulated platforms. Instead, she advocated for age-appropriate content standards and functionality-based restrictions, drawing comparisons with the ratings systems used for video games and films. Darlington has also highlighted the widespread problem of catfishing and online grooming, warning that the majority of grooming now happens online and frequently moves into real-world harm. She has engaged with the Molly Rose Foundation, attending a roundtable hosted by the organisation in November 2025 to discuss safeguards on social media.

Darlington has been outspoken in opposing proposals to repeal the Online Safety Act 2023. In November 2025, she warned in an interview with the Daily Mirror that Nigel Farage's pledge to scrap the Act would effectively "put porn back into children's pockets," and argued that critics of the legislation were failing to consider how online abuse spills into real-life harm. She has also hosted a parliamentary roundtable with the Online Safety Act Network, bringing together civil society organisations to discuss the Act's implementation.

As a member of the Science, Innovation and Technology Select Committee, Darlington has scrutinised major social media platforms and the regulator Ofcom. In a February 2025 committee session examining social media, misinformation and harmful algorithms, she confronted Wifredo Fernandez, X's senior director for government affairs, over the platform's failure to remove accounts posting violent threats and racist and misogynistic content directed at her and other MPs. She read out a message she had received threatening that she would "swing oh so slowly on a gibbet," which had been reported but not removed, and asked whether such content was acceptable under the guise of free speech. She has also questioned Ofcom on the transparency of large and small platforms, the consistency of online and offline content rules, and the extent to which the Online Safety Act depends on platforms' own self-reporting. In a further session, she questioned Ofcom's chief executive on whether the regulator was being placed under pressure by US officials to soften the Online Safety Act, and pressed for greater transparency about such meetings.

== AI regulation and deepfakes ==
Darlington has taken a consistent position in favour of binding statutory regulation of powerful AI systems. In January 2026, she signed a cross-party letter to Science Secretary Liz Kendall urging the government to strengthen AI regulation following the use of Elon Musk's Grok AI tool to generate non-consensual sexual deepfakes, including images of children. She raised the issue at Prime Minister's Questions on 14 January 2026, stating that "stripping women naked without consent in real life or online is abuse," and challenging the government to enforce UK law against tech giants. She noted that in the minutes after her question, people had submitted requests to Grok for AI-generated images of her, and argued that the episode demonstrated that "we can enforce UK law" and that tech giants will change when faced with determined government action. She also criticised the government's initial proposal to regulate AI through Henry VIII powers contained in the Online Safety Act, arguing that legislating in the same way as for hundreds of years was not adequate for the pace of AI development.

In May 2026, Darlington backed the ControlAI campaign, joining over 100 UK politicians calling for binding regulation on the most powerful AI systems, citing the risk posed by superintelligent AI. She has been part of a cross-party group of MPs, including former Conservative AI minister George Freeman, seeking to amend the Elections Bill to make the creation of political deepfakes illegal. Darlington has warned that existing frameworks leave politicians "dangerously exposed," noting that the Electoral Commission has no remit online and that the Online Safety Act does not cover elections, leaving a regulatory gap that Ofcom has not prioritised. She has argued that momentum for action is building across the House and that protecting democracy from AI-generated misinformation is a matter of urgency.
