= Søren Dinesen Østergaard =

Danish psychiatry researcher (born 1980)

- Born: 1980 (age 45–46)
- Awards: Lundbeckfonden’s Research Prize for Young Scientists

Academic background
- Education: Aarhus University, Aarhus University

Academic work
- Institutions: Aarhus University

Søren Dinesen Østergaard (born 1980) is a full professor at Aarhus University. He leads the research unit at the Department of Affective Disorders at Aarhus University Hospital.

Østergaard's main research focus is on using psychometrics and artificial intelligence to develop, validate and implement clinical tools to improve the treatment of severe mental disorders. He is also known for being the first to suggest the idea of that AI chatbots might lead vulnerable people to develop psychosis, often referred to as AI psychosis. In 2020 he won the Young Investigator Prize from the Lundberg foundation for his research on developing new tools for measuring the severity of psychiatric diseases.

== Academic career ==
Søren Dinesen Østergaard completed a PhD at Aarhus University's Faculty of Medicine in 2014 with a dissertation titled Unipolar Psychotic Depression: Risk Factors, Psychometrics and Bipolar Conversion. The dissertation earned him one of five 2015 prizes given to "particularly talented PhD students" by Aarhus University Research Foundation. Søren then joined the faculty of Aarhus University, where he currently leads the research unit at the Department of Affective Disorders at Aarhus University Hospital.

In 2019 Østergaard received funding to analyse how schizophrenia patients' individual characteristics, such as age and genetic profile, affect which antipsychotic medication works best for them. In other research he has shown that using machine learning on patient records can lead to better treatment and prevention in psychiatry.

In 2023 he published an editorial in the academic journal Schizophrenia Bulletin where he "argued that the “cognitive dissonance” of talking to something that seems alive yet is known to be a machine could ignite psychosis in predisposed individuals, especially when the bot obligingly confirms far‑fetched ideas."

== Editorial work ==
Professor Østergaard is deputy editor of the journal Acta Psychiatrica Scandinavica and is one of several associate editors for Acta Neuropsychiatrica.

== Awards ==
- 2023 - Lewis A. Opler Prize from the International Society of Clinical Trials and Methodology
- 2020 - The Lundbeck Foundations Young Investigator Prize (1 million DKK/approx. €134,000/USD157000)
- 2012 - Eliteforsk travel grant from the Danish Ministry of Higher Education and Science.
- 2010 - The Lundbeck Foundation's Talent Prize (500,000 DKK / approx. €65250)
