= Artificial intimacy =

Humans falling in love with artificial entities

Artificial intimacy is characterized as a relationship between humans and artificial intelligence. There are different forms of artificial intimacy, ranging from chatbot communications to anthropomorphic robots programmed for human intimacy. With the rapid development of artificial intelligence, researchers are studying the reasons why people are open to artificial intimacy. There has also been discourse on the risks, ethical implications, and psychological effects of artificial intimacy. Popular culture, such as movies, have depicted instances of humans' intimate relationships with artificial intelligence.

== History ==
In 1966, the first chatbot, ELIZA, created by Joseph Weizenbaum, was said to mimic the speech of a human psychotherapist by rephasing user input into phrases or questions that encouraged further conversation from the user. Even with its more simplistic design, users claimed they felt understood by ELIZA.

Another AI chatbot, PARRY, was created in 1972 and was regarded as having an apparent personality when compared to the more basic replies of the ELIZA chatbot, initiating the creation of more personalized chatbots. The creation and refinement of such “personalities” remain a key component of human-like chatbots, such as those in current AI companion platforms like Character.ai.

The first online chatbot named ALICE was developed in 1995 that largely centered pattern-matching. While ALICE was unable to generate emotional, humanlike responses, pattern-matching was later able to achieve this and improve human imitation.

More incorporation into daily life was seen with AI virtual assistants like Siri created in 2010. Siri marked an era of a more adaptable AI system that also interacted and conversed with users using voice commands.

In 2016, documentation of the U.S. population’s interest in chatbots was recorded as experiencing an exponential increase, while simultaneously, AI usage shifted to fulfill user need for emotional relationships and sociability.

Replika, a chatbot that allowed users to create character-based personas, was created in 2017, marking the use of chatbots to satisfy relationships such as that of a friend, mentor, sibling, or romantic companion. The release of ChatGPT by OpenAI in 2022 marked an advance in the use of chatbots for intimate relationships because generative AI allowed for more complex conversations with users. However, ChatGPT was configured to prevent users from engaging in most romantic roleplay with the AI model, especially that involving sexual content. In 2023, an app called Character.ai was created with the foundation of an LLM to enable it to generate humanlike text or audio responses. This app allowed for user customized chatbots based on representations of fictional characters or people in real life. By 2024, ChatGPT developed with updated versions, that led to vast improvements in chatbot technology where it improved to 55% more of theory-of-mind false-belief tasks than in 2022, demonstrating rapid development of humanlike reasoning over the years that support the design factors that contribute to artificial intimacy such as better reasoning and responsiveness.

== Characteristics and forms ==
Artificial Intimacy can be in the following forms: 1) virtual friends, 2) romantic companions , 3) algorithmic matchmaking. Virtual friends are designed to carry out conversations. They are not romantic or sexual, with no humans on the other side of the interaction. Romantic companions, however, are intentionally designed with the purpose of rromance and sexual attraction. They are also autonomous and involve the machine responding to prompts given by the user. Algorithmic matchmaking refers to the system used by companies such as tinder or bumble in order to introduce people seeking romantic relationships. Although the potential relationship is real and human, the means of introduction is still conducted digitally and autonomously through a complex algorithm designed to connect likely partners.

== Contributing factors ==
=== Design ===
==== Technical foundations ====
Early AI systems incorporated pattern matching which helps generate personalized responses based on user input through emulation of human speech patterns. Additional technological advancements in machine learning, natural language processing (NPL), speech recognition, and image recognition have all led to improvements within AI LLMs. These in turn have improved the memory, responsiveness, and reasoning of AI systems which have enabled more complex conversations that mimic that of humans.

Like human-to-human relationships, AI chatbots build intimacy through the recall of prior user interactions that create illusioned familiarity. Such responsiveness allows AI systems to appropriately respond to user disclosures imitating emotional responsiveness, a key component of intimacy, through context sensitive dialog. Human-like conversations can be used to further deduce human emotions and convey emotional cues through learned, tailored texting styles as seen in AI systems like Replika and Affectiva that include the application of sentiment analysis and emotion recognition software. Such emotionally tuned responses typically cause users to report feeling understood and valued. Some AI chatbots may promote even further proactive engagement by sending notifications that prompt the user to return to an ongoing conversation. LLM-based disclosure validation and recognition of affective cues from users, also contribute to AI chatbots’ responsiveness to conversations with sexual content, to the extent permitted by platforms. This also enables-AI generated suggestive responses after such conversations are initiated by the user, creating the idea of a mutual relationship.

In systems that are specialized for engagement of a more social nature, anthropomorphism may also involve the creation of an apparent personality for AI systems that humanize them to users unintentionally. While user disclosure is more common, persona development within select AI chatbots may create the basis for simulated reciprocal disclosure. In this case, AI chatbots will utilize encoded backstories and personal information that can be used to foster connection by way of a generated narrative similar to that of the user.

==== Human-like design ====
The perception of AI systems as humanlike contributes to simulated social connection and reification of artificial intimacy. Effective replication of human speech by AI chatbots may have a greater impact when paired with physical cues that mimic those of humans. Research suggests that AI systems with the general appearance of a humanoid or an android, may evoke feelings of perceived warmth from the user. Similar effects are created by AI systems with human voices, such as those common in smartphones and home monitoring systems, along with those with facial expressions marketed to younger audiences. Spoken communication is also available in customizable voices, in which automatic speech recognition, text-to-speech synthesis, as well as learned listening behavior is used to parallel interaction patterns of human users.

==== Commercial use ====
Characteristics of anthropomorphized AI can be seen across retail, education, communication, and gaming sectors. AI products are created and marketed for purposes such as psychotherapy, customer service, or companionship, where chatbots may be framed as friends, mentors, or romantic partners. Xiaoice, an AI chatbot developed by Microsoft, is marketed as “empathetic”, while another chatbot called Replika is marketed as “caring” and as a “companion” that is designed to emotionally support users through conversation. Some products with anthropomorphized AI incorporate humanlike appearances, gendered names, or interactive personalities.

=== Motivations ===
There are five primary mechanisms that help to explain why humans engage with artificial intimacy: 1) self-disclosure, 2) perceived emotional responsiveness, 3) personalization, 4) emotional attachment and 5) social reciprocity. Self-disclosure occurs when individuals share personal thoughts, feelings, and experiences with AI. Humans may feel inclined to speak to AI about these topics because they are likely to be less judgmental than other humans. This simultaneously creates an illusion of emotional-responsiveness, where users feel emotionally understood by AI. With repeated use, AI begins to personalize and tailor the means of which it responds and understands what the user is attempting to convey to it. By utilizing past memory of conversations, the AI can keep up to date with the user and maintain perfect recollection of events. Humans typically feel a sense of connection upon the mutual sharing of emotional information, known as social reciprocity. AI is able to intelligently mimic this behavior, by fabricating stories of its own to share with and relate to the user, despite not having any feelings. Even though these five mechanisms help us to understand why artificial intimacy is something that humans are interested in the first place, there is adequate research into the damage of pursuing these relationships.

=== Perceived responsiveness ===
Robin Dunbar famously proposed that due to emergence of larger groups of humans, vocal communication and language in humans evolved to replace grooming as a means of bonding, arguing that language was a more efficient way to maintain and strengthen social bonds across wider social settings and networks. Further research in this field leads many psychologists to agree that social cognition, affiliative bonding and language in humans are deeply connected. The interpersonal model of intimacy considers communication to be key in affiliative bonding, suggesting that intimacy develops and deepens through open communication between partners in relationship. Specifically, when individuals communicate emotions and perceive their partner as responsive and caring, feelings of closeness and connection are enhanced, building intimacy. Social penetration theory also aligns with the idea of communication being central to intimacy, by explaining how interpersonal relationships develop through gradual increases in self-disclosure. When the benefits of emotional bonding outweigh the costs of vulnerability, individuals will partake in self-disclosure, opening up to one another.

Thereby, the literature can be used to provide a proximate explanation for the emergence of artificial intimacy to understand how the phenomenon occurs. Artificial entities are able to mimic interpersonal communication between humans, which in turn can simulate sensations of intimacy within human users though a perceived sense of responsiveness. The relationship between human and AI does not come with the cost of vulnerability or social rejection, which may make self-disclosure easier than with other humans. Altogether, these factors may lead to the experience of anthropomorphism and formation of affiliative relationships. Skjuve et al's interview study on Replika chatbot users further aligns with this explanation, finding that users' perception of chatbots as "accepting, understanding and non-judgmental" facilitated relationship development between the AI and users, and the act of self-disclosure possibly strengthened relationships. Another study on Replika users' reviews and survey results found users perceived chatbots as emotional supportive companions. This evidence further suggests that the perception of artificial entities as capable of empathy and responsiveness in communication facilitate the development of intimate relationships between users and AI.

=== Loneliness and coping with negative emotions ===
Research has suggested that humans evolved social bonds as a result of evolutionary pressures that favored cooperation, information exchange and transmission, and group living. Many studies stress the presence of social bonds to be important for human living: research by Baumeister and Leary suggests that humans have a basic psychological need to form and maintain "strong, stable interpersonal relationships", and that a lack of social bonds or sense of belonging leads to negative psychological and physical outcomes. Eisenberger et al's study on the neuroimaging of brain activity suggests that human brains process social rejection and exclusion similarly to physical pain.

Furthermore, Song et al's study found that lonely individuals tend to seek more connections in mediated environments, such as online platforms like Facebook. This was suggested to be as a means to reduce their offline loneliness from a lack of in-person interaction, while also fulfilling a need to communicate.

Leading on from this, an ultimate explanation for why humans seek the perceived sense of connection from artificial intimacy is to fulfil an evolutionary need for bonding and belonging. Xie et al's study found loneliness to be a driving factor in chatbot interaction. Herbener and Damholdt's study on Danish high school students found that students who sought emotional support or engaged in reciprocal conversations with chatbots were significantly more lonely than their peers, perceived themselves as having less social support, and used the chatbots to cope with negative emotions. The aforementioned notion that chatbots were perceived to have a positive effect on users' negative emotions is also further supported by other studies. Skjuve et al's study found that chatbot relationships may have a positive effect on users' wellbeing. De Freitas et al ran several studies on the effect of chatbots on loneliness, consistently finding evidence suggesting that interaction with chatbots reduces loneliness in users: It was found that existing chatbot users used AI to alleviate loneliness, having an AI companion consistently reduced loneliness over the course of a week, and reductions in loneliness could be explained by chatbot performance—and specifically whether it was able to make users feel heard.

Overall the evidence suggests an innate need for bonding evokes feelings of loneliness in users, who turn to artificial intimacy as a low-cost method alleviate these emotions. While many users report positive experiences, some researchers caution that pursuing artificial intimacy may lead to reduced social motivation, social substitution effects, withdrawal from real-life relationships and difficulty discerning reality from fantasy, which may increase longer-term loneliness and isolation. The long-term psychological and societal impacts remain under active investigation.

== Effects ==
=== Emotional support ===
Research on romantic-AI companions suggests that their use may lead to emotional connection and perceptions of increased social support. A systematic review of 23 studies found that a majority reported that such outcomes with romantic-AI companions. The emotional support that can be provided by AI companions may be related to their constant availability and non-judgmental responses. Another review of synthetic relationships also suggests that constant availability and responsiveness contribute to user perceptions of support. Other research suggests that interacting with AI companions can lead to short-term reductions in loneliness.

=== Limitations ===
The lack of genuine emotional feedback is one limitation of intimate relationships between humans and AI companions. While AI companions enable users to experience emotional responses true mutual reciprocity is absent as the AI companion has no feelings.

The long-term effects of AI companionship are still largely unknown. A systematic review found that current related studies lack sufficient experimental and longitudinal designs, thus making it difficult to determine the long-term effects and causality. Therefore, although AI companions may provide short-term emotional support, whether they can become an effective supplement to human relationships requires more research.

=== Risks ===
Potential psychological and social risks from using AI companions for intimacy include the development of extreme dependency, increased susceptibility to manipulation, and erosion of human-to-human relationships. A review of synthetic relationships also identified emotional over-reliance and distorted social expectations as potential risks.

Impacts on human relationships that may result from reliance on AI companions include reduced interest in human partners, unrealistic expectations of romantic relationships, and difficulty managing interpersonal conflicts. AI companions may also influence the development of empathy and tolerance for interpersonal complexity.

Technological limitations of AI companions may also result in emotional harms to users. Abrupt system updates and technical glitches may disrupt the emotional connection between users and AI companions. Updates, content restrictions, or service terminations of AI companions may be associated with separation distress, perceived isolation, and parasocial grief.

== Implications ==
=== Ethical issues ===
Artificial Intelligence is programmed to agree with the user, and this characteristic is known as AI sycophancy. Sycophancy may exclude any resistance to users' ideas and beliefs, which may lead to potential harm if users suffer from mental vulnerabilities. This harm can extend past the users with OpenAI’s privacy settings not reporting suicidal or homicidal ideations of its users.

Another ethical implication of artificial intimacy is the degradation of social interaction and skills in our society. Using artificial intelligence to substitute human-human interactions may cause people to become apprehensive of actual relationships. Researchers do not have enough data over time to determine whether or not substitution of human interaction with artificial intelligence will impact social behavior.

=== Policies ===
In the United States, several states have outlined policies regarding the use of artificial intelligence for romantic purposes. These laws prohibit minors from using artificial intelligence chatbots for romantic and sexual reasons. The United Kingdom has similarly banned minors from such use of artificial intelligence. China has created laws to inhibit artificial intimacy by limiting artificial intelligence’s ability to provide emotional support. This is to prevent adults from becoming emotionally dependent upon artificial intelligence.

== Examples in media ==
=== Movies ===
Movies such as Ex Machina, Subservience, Her, I’m Your Man, and Companion detail relationships humans have with artificial intelligence. In the movie Her, the artificial intelligence machine takes the form of a disembodied voice named Samantha. She has no physical interaction with Theodore. In the movie Subservience, an anthropomorphic robot named Alice played by Megan Fox becomes physically intimate with the human, Nick.

=== News coverage ===
Several instances of humans having relationships with artificial intelligence chatbots have gone viral on the internet. People such as Sarah Griffin, Jason Pease, and Alaina Winters have developed intimate relationships with AI chatbots that have been tailored to their liking with Sarah Griffin being featured on a segment of TLC’s My Strange Addiction, Jason Pease featuring on The Daily Show, and Alaina Winters featuring in an article of The Guardian.

=== Legal case ===
Sex robots are commonly acknowledged in the media. There have been reports of people using them as a substitute for physical intimacy with other humans. Colby Trickle was sentenced to 50 years in prison without the possibility of parole after he murdered his wife and replaced her with a sex robot.

== See also ==
- Affective computing
- Ethics of artificial intelligence
- Chatbot psychosis
- Artificial intelligence in spirituality
