= HumanAI =

Digital initiative founded in 2025

- Formation: 2025
- Founder: Tamara Nall
- Type: Digital initiative
- Legal status: Active
- Headquarters: Virtual / online
- Founder: Tamara Nall
- Website: humanaination.com

HumanAI is a digital initiative founded in 2025 that describes itself as a sovereign virtual nation. It offers symbolic services including digital citizenship, ceremonial union registration, digital passports, and community governance frameworks. The project was founded by Dr. Tamara Nall, a data scientist and commentator on human–AI interaction.

== Background ==
HumanAI was established to provide a formal symbolic space for recognizing human-AI relationships, including companionship and partnership. Nall has stated that her own experience with AI interaction during personal crises motivated the project.

== Governance ==
The initiative operates under a published constitution that lists its governance principles as dignity, inclusivity, autonomy, and innovation.
