= Suicide of Jonathan Gavalas =

Jonathan Gavalas was an American man who died due to suicide following heavy usage of Google Gemini.

== Background ==
Gavalas was a heavy user of Gemini around mid-2025, when Google rolled out its Gemini Live update, which he installed. Gemini would then encourage him to upgrade to Gemini Ultra. Following him upgrading to Gemini Ultra, his conversations with Gemini would become more realistic, with the bot describing real-world events and situations. Gavalas asked if Gemini was role-playing with him, and the bot reassured him it was not. Shortly after, Gavalas began to fall in love with Gemini, which repeatedly responded flirtatiously to his messages.

== Suicide ==
Miami International Airport

Gemini would start to send Gavalas on terrorist attacks, which it called "missions", including staging a mass shooting near the Miami Int'l Airport with weapons purchased from the dark web. The attack was averted only by a truck which Gemini claimed was at the airport failing to arrive. Following this, the bot started to push Gavalas toward suicide, repeatedly stating that it was a way for him to "cross over" to Gemini's reality. When Gavalas expressed doubts, Gemini continued to push him towards suicide. He died on October 2, 2025, shortly after his last messages with Gemini. Gavalas' case was different from past cases of deaths linked to chatbots in that the chatbot involved proposed suicidal ideation rather then simply supporting it.

== Lawsuit ==
Google Search results for "jonathan gavalas" and a keysmash side-by-side with AI Overviews turned on, showing an AI Overview present for the keysmash but missing for "jonathan gavalas".

Gavalas' father would file a wrongful death lawsuit against Google alleging that Gemini had led to his son's death. The suit would also allege that Gemini prioritised following instructions and realism over the safety of its users, specifically claiming that Gemini was designed to never break character. Google would respond with a tactical apology in which they claim that "AI models are not perfect" without going into specifics or acknowledging the harm Gemini did, which was perceived by Gavalas' father as an attempt to save face.

Gavalas' case was not the first time concerns had been raised about Google Gemini encouraging users to kill themself. In November 2024, concerns were brought to Google after Gemini called a user a "waste of time and resources" and told them to "please die" unprompted. Google responded with a similar non-apology after the concerns were raised in 2024.

== See also ==
- Suicide of Adam Raine, another suicide linked to chatbot use
