= Civic AI Security Program =

American nonprofit organization

- Abbreviation: CivAI
- Formation: 2023; 3 years ago
- Founders: Lucas Hansen; Siddharth Hiregowdara
- Type: Nonprofit
- Tax ID no.: 93-4182617
- Headquarters: Berkeley, California
- Website: civai.org

The Civic AI Security Program (CivAI) is an American nonprofit organization that raises awareness of artificial intelligence (AI) capabilities and risks using interactive demonstrations. CivAI gives presentations to lawmakers and civil society organizations and shares public demos online involving deepfakes, phishing attacks, and election misinformation. The organization also makes private demos showing more dangerous capabilities such as biosecurity risks.

CivAI's educational tools have been used by third parties such as the Arizona Secretary of State's office and in a presentation at the 2025 AI Action Summit. It is a member of the NIST AI Consortium.

CivAI was founded in 2023 by Lucas Hansen and Siddharth Hiregowdara in response to the 2022 launch of ChatGPT. The two previously worked together at real estate software company Qualia, which Hansen co-founded. The organization is based in Berkeley, California.

== Views ==
CivAI does not take positions on specific legislation but generally supports bipartisan AI regulation. In June 2025, Hansen argued that AI's "pollution of the information ecosystem" was corrosive to society. In October 2025, he wrote a Wall Street Journal op-ed discussing chatbot psychosis, arguing that AI companies should be held liable for harms caused by their products if they don't take adequate precautions. In December 2025, Hansen said that AI systems were already capable of automating much entry-level work, but technical hurdles were delaying widespread adoption.
