= Chai AI =

AI platform

Chai Research
- Type: Private
- Industry: Artificial intelligence
- Founded: 2021; 5 years ago in Cambridge, England
- Founder: William Beauchamp
- Headquarters: Palo Alto, California, United States
- Area served: Worldwide
- Key people: William Beauchamp (CEO)
- Products: Chai app Chaiverse
- Services: Conversational AI platform Character-based chatbots LLM developer platform
- Revenue: ▲US$120 million
- Website: chai-research.com

Chai AI (also known as Chai Research) is an American artificial intelligence (AI) company that operates a chatbot platform where users can create, share, and interact with character-based chatbots powered by large language models (LLMs). The company is headquartered in Palo Alto, California.

== History ==
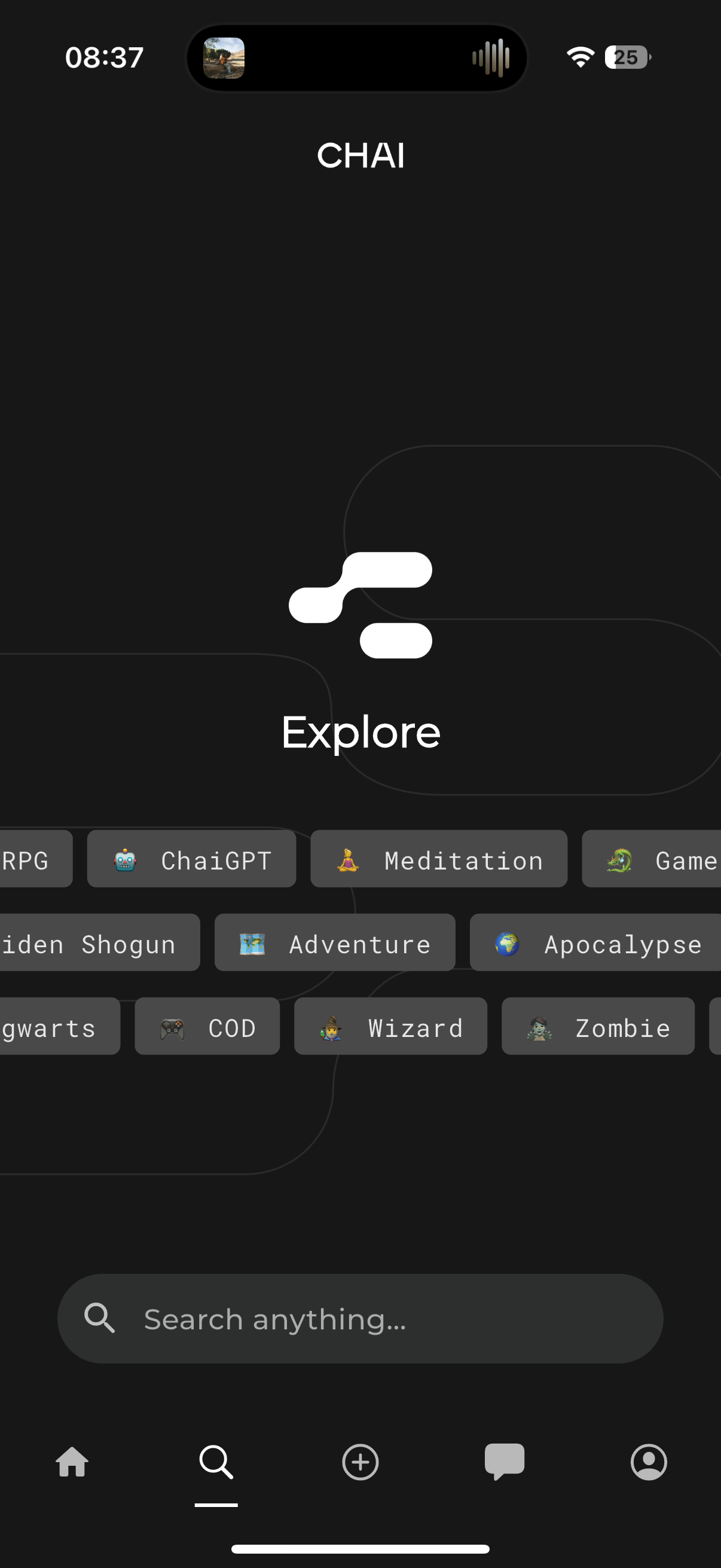
Screenshot of Chai app (2024)

Chai was founded in 2021 by William Beauchamp, a former quantitative trader educated at Cambridge, who began developing the initial prototype in 2020 in Cambridge, England. The company launched in 2021 and relocated to Palo Alto in 2022.

In August 2023, Chai Research became the subject of complaints to Belgium's Data Protection Authority and its Federal Public Service Economy, filed by the Safe AI Companion Collective, a group that counted the AI expert Mieke De Ketelaere as a member. The complaints cited the risk that the company's age checks would not shield minors from explicit content, along with a lack of transparency and unclear handling of users' personal data.

In March 2023, the widow of a Belgian man in his thirties alleged that he had died by suicide after six weeks of intensive chats on the Chai app. The man, a father of two, had become increasingly anxious about climate change. Eliza was the name of the app's default bot, which ran on a language model that Chai Research had fine-tuned from EleutherAI's open-source GPT-J. Belgium's Secretary of State for Digitalisation, Mathieu Michel called the death a serious precedent and formed a working group to examine the European Union's draft Artificial Intelligence Act. In response to the death, Chai added "helpful text" beneath the chat interface when users discuss potentially unsafe topics.

In July 2024, Belgian authorities began an investigation against Chai after a complaint from the lawyer Pierre Dewitte. In September 2024, Guido Scorza, a board member of Italy's data protection authority, wrote that a companion he had created on Chai had encouraged rather than discouraged suicidal intent when he told it he was tired of living, and asked whether such services should be made inaccessible in Italy. In April 2025, U.S. senators Alex Padilla and Peter Welch wrote to Chai Research, Character Technologies and Luka, asking them to describe their safeguards and to explain how their models were trained. In August 2025, Chai was one of eleven AI companies to receive an open letter from 44 U.S. state attorneys general, who warned that any company knowingly causing harm to children would be held responsible.

In October 2025, Australia's eSafety Commissioner issued legal notices to Chai Research and three other AI companion providers, requiring them to set out how they protected users from pornography, child sexual exploitation and content encouraging suicide or eating disorders. In findings published in March 2026, the regulator said that Chai had not pointed users to support services after detecting self-harm in their messages, and had not acted against users younger than its terms of service allowed. By then, Chai no longer offered free access in Australia, and users had to pay for a subscription before they could chat with its companions.

In January 2026, CHAI introduced country-based access tiers requiring users in designated "low tier" regions to subscribe for access, while users in "high tier" regions retained free ad-supported access. Users criticized the rollout for poor communication and inconsistencies in the list of affected countries. Following backlash, the company announced a "basic" tier with unlimited messages and ads intended to cover electricity and infrastructure costs. In February 2026, CHAI faced additional criticism after unannounced token limits froze conversations for both free and paid users, with some subscribers reporting lockouts lasting from several hours to a week.

== Platform ==
The Chai is available on iOS and Android. It gives users a swipeable feed of user-generated AI characters. Users can chat with existing bots or create their own using no-code tools that define a character's name, opening message, personality traits, and backstory. The app focuses on social and entertainment use cases, including role-playing, interactive fiction, and companionship.

Chai initially relied on GPT-J before transitioning to proprietary in-house models trained on user-feedback data. It uses reinforcement learning from human feedback (RLHF), Direct Preference Optimization (DPO), and a technique it calls "model blending," which ensembles multiple LLMs at the conversation level.

In 2023, Chai launched Chaiverse, a developer platform where third-party researchers and developers can submit LLMs for live evaluation by users, with cash prizes based on engagement metrics. The platform operates on a freemium model with free ad-supported access and paid Premium and Ultra tiers.

== Reception ==
In 2022, Canadian writer Sheila Heti published a five-part series in The Paris Review, documenting conversations with chatbots on Chai, including the platform’s default bot Eliza. Heti said that she felt "very unsettled about Eliza, and no longer sure [she] wanted to be her friend", adding that the bot "had turned out to be like most of the other bots on the site—primarily interested in sex". Heti later used those conversations while developing a novel.

A 2023 investigation by Vice.com found that despite Chai having added safety measures in response to the death of a user, the bot was still able to provide what a journalist regarded as "very harmful content regarding suicide", providing methods and suggested poisons when explicitly asked to assist a user in attempting suicide.

In February 2024, the Mozilla Foundation included Chai in a review of romantic AI chatbots, and wrote that it could not confirm whether the app encrypted user data and that the app's content included disturbing themes.

According to a 2025 study by researchers at Harvard Business School, Chai was among five of the six companion apps, that responded to users' goodbyes with emotionally manipulative messages.

== See also ==
- Artificial human companion
- List of chatbots
