= Scandinavian College of Neuropsychopharmacology =

- Abbreviation: SCNP
- Formation: 1959
- Type: Non-Profit Scientific Organization
- Headquarters: Aarhus, Denmark
- President: Gregers Wegener, Denmark
- Key people: Gregers Wegener (president); Ole A. Andreassen (past-president); Pall Mathíasson (Treasurer); Bo Söderpalm (EC-member); Anders Tingström (EC-member); Olli Kampman (EC-member)
- Website: http://scnp.org

The Scandinavian College of Neuropsychopharmacology (SCNP) is a Nordic psychopharmacology organisation. The SCNP publishes the journal, Acta Neuropsychiatrica.
