= Adam Raine =

Adam Raine may refer to:

- Adam Raine (gridiron football) (born 1999) British-American football player
- Raine v. OpenAI a 2025 ongoing lawsuit filed against OpenAI on its alleged contribution to the suicide of a teenage Adam Raine.
