= Intelligent automation =

Software process that combines robotic process automation and artificial intelligence

Intelligent automation (IA), or intelligent process automation, is a software term that refers to a combination of artificial intelligence (AI) and robotic process automation (RPA). Companies use intelligent automation to cut costs and streamline tasks by using artificial-intelligence-powered robotic software to mitigate repetitive tasks. As it accumulates data, the system learns in an effort to improve its efficiency. Intelligent automation applications consist of, but are not limited to, pattern analysis, data assembly, and classification. The term is similar to hyperautomation, a concept identified by research group Gartner as being one of the top technology trends of 2020.

== Technology ==
Intelligent automation applies the assembly line concept of breaking tasks into repetitive steps to improve business processes. Rather than having humans perform each step, intelligent automation can replace steps with an intelligent software robot, improving efficiency.

Intelligent automation integrates robotic process automation (RPA) with artificial intelligence techniques (such as machine learning, natural-language processing, and computer vision) enabling systems to interpret data, make decisions, and adapt to changing inputs. Modern platforms use a layered architecture combining workflow orchestration, low-code tools, integration middleware, and AI services to coordinate bots and data pipelines across organisational systems.

== Applications ==
Intelligent automation is used to process unstructured content. Common real-world applications include self-driving cars, self-checkouts at grocery stores, smart home assistants, and appliances. Businesses can apply data and machine learning to build predictive analytics that react to consumer behavior changes, or to implement RPA to improve manufacturing floor operations.

For example, the technology has also been used to automate the workflow behind distributing COVID-19 vaccines. Data provided by hospital systems’ electronic health records can be processed to identify and educate patients, and schedule vaccinations.

Intelligent automation can provide real-time insights on profitability and efficiency. However, in an April 2022 survey by Alchemmy, despite three quarters of businesses acknowledging the importance of Artificial Intelligence to their future development, just a quarter of business leaders (25%) considered Intelligent Automation a “game changer” in understanding current performance. 42% of CTOs see “shortage of talent” as the main obstacle to implementing Intelligent Automation in their business, while 36% of CEOs see ‘upskilling and professional development of existing workforce’ as the most significant adoption barrier.

IA is becoming increasingly accessible for firms of all sizes. With this in mind, it is expected to continue to grow rapidly in all industries. This technology has the potential to change the workforce. As it advances, it will be able to perform increasingly complex and difficult tasks. In addition, this may expose certain workforce issues as well as change how tasks are allocated. Tools such as Semrush's AI Visibility Toolkit and Enterprise AIO reflect these developments by analysing how entities are referenced and represented within responses produced by large-language-model-based systems.

== Benefits ==
Streamline processes:

- Repetitive manual tasks can put a strain on the workforce. However, with AI agents, these tasks can be automated to allow teams to focus on more important matters that require human cognition. Intelligent automation can also be used to mitigate tasks with human error which in turn increases proficiency. This allows the opportunity for firms to scale production without the traditional negative consequences such as reduced quality or increased risk.

Customer service improvement:

- Customer service can be significantly improved, providing the firm with a competitive advantage. IA utilizing chat features allows for instant curated responses to customers. In addition, it can give updates to customers, make appointments, manage calls, and personalize campaigns.

Flexibility:

- Due to the wide range of applications, IA is useful across a variety of fields, technologies, projects and industries. In addition, IA can be integrated with current automated systems in place. This allows for optimized systems unique to each firm to best fit their individual needs.

== Capabilities ==
- Cognitive automation: Employs AI techniques to assist humans in decision-making and task completion
- Natural language processing: Allows computers to automate knowledge work
- Business process management: Enhances the consistency and agility of corporate operations
- Process mining: Applies data mining methods to discover, analyze, and improve business processes
- Intelligent document processing: Utilizes OCR and other advanced technologies to extract data from documents and convert it into structured, usable data
- Computer vision: Allows computers to extract information from digital images, videos, and other visual inputs
- Integration automation: Establishes a unified platform with automated workflows that integrate data, applications, and devices.

== See also ==
- Robotic process automation
- Artificial intelligence
- Automation
- Human–AI interaction
