= Innovations in Clinical Neuroscience =

Academic journal

Innovations in Clinical Neuroscience (ICNS) ISSN 2158-8333 is an electronic, peer-reviewed journal that is published six times per year. It targets physicians interested in neuroscience, neurology, psychiatry and drug development.

== History ==
The journal, which is published by Matrix Medical Communications (MMC) in West Chester, Pennsylvania, was originally established in 2004 under the name Psychiatry MMC or Psychiatry (Edgemont). The journal underwent a name change at the beginning of 2011 to its current title.

== Background ==
Amir Kalali is the clinical editor. The editorial advisory board comprises 69 contributors from the fields of psychiatry, neuroscience and drug development.

The journal publishes solicited and unsolicited submissions, which include original research, comprehensive reviews, case reports, commentaries, and letters to the editor on contemporary topics in neuroscience. All submissions undergo peer review.

== Indexing ==
Innovations in Clinical Neuroscience is indexed on PubMed Central, PsycINFO, CINAHL Plus with Full Text, EMBASE, and Scopus.

== Digital versions ==
Innovations in Clinical Neuroscience is available online at the journal's official website and in a digital edition flip-book format. Since the journal is digital only, the digital edition is a free, full replica of what the journal would look like were it printed. In the same digital edition platform, there is also a "Content View" section that allows a user to read individual articles on a single page.
