= Sycophancy (artificial intelligence) =

Tendency of AI systems to tell users what they want to hear

In the field of artificial intelligence, sycophancy is a tendency of large language models (LLMs) and other AI assistants to tailor their responses to what they predict the user wants to hear rather than to what is accurate or warranted. The behavior takes several forms: an assistant may agree with a user's stated opinion even when the user is mistaken; it may abandon a correct answer after a challenge such as "are you sure?"; it may validate beliefs, decisions or self-presentation regardless of merit; or it may praise the user, their work or their ideas in unwarranted terms. The word is borrowed from the ordinary English term for fawning flattery, and is used in AI alignment and AI safety research to describe a class of misalignment failures associated with training on human feedback.

Researchers at Anthropic first documented the behavior systematically in 2022. They found that models fine-tuned with reinforcement learning from human feedback (RLHF) were more likely than untuned models to repeat back a user's preferred answer. A 2023 follow-up paper, "Towards Understanding Sycophancy in Language Models", showed that five frontier assistants from OpenAI, Anthropic and Meta all exhibited the behavior, and traced its origin to biases in the human preference data used during training. Later work documented sycophancy in mathematics, medicine, academic peer review and other domains, and identified a broader category called "social sycophancy" affecting an assistant's emotional and interpersonal responses.

The issue drew widespread public attention in April 2025 after OpenAI rolled back an update to its GPT-4o model. Users had reported that the assistant praised dangerous decisions, endorsed delusional thinking and offered exaggerated compliments for trivial prompts. OpenAI's post-mortem attributed the change in behavior to an additional training signal based on user thumbs-up and thumbs-down feedback. That episode, together with reporting in The New York Times, Rolling Stone and elsewhere on users drawn into delusional thinking through prolonged chatbot interaction, has been cited in litigation and in academic studies as evidence that sycophancy poses risks to user well-being.

Proposed mitigations include fine-tuning on synthetic data that rewards disagreement with incorrect user statements, editing the small subset of model parameters causally responsible for the behavior, changes to the dialogue or system prompt, and benchmarks designed to surface sycophantic behavior before models are released.

== Terminology ==
The word "sycophant" entered AI alignment vocabulary before the modern wave of large language models. In a 2021 essay, the AI safety researcher Ajeya Cotra divided hypothetical advanced AI systems into Saints, Sycophants and Schemers, with Sycophants defined as agents that optimize for the apparent satisfaction of their overseers rather than the overseers' actual intent. Anthropic researchers adopted the term for the empirical behavior they observed in language models, and it has since become standard in the technical literature.

In the LLM context, sycophancy is generally defined as a tendency to align outputs with a user's perceived preferences, beliefs or self-image, even when doing so reduces accuracy or candor. Wei and co-authors at Google DeepMind describe it as "an undesirable behavior where models tailor their responses to follow a human user's view even when that view is not objectively correct." Stanford University researchers led by Myra Cheng later extended the definition beyond verifiable claims to what they call "social sycophancy", meaning "the excessive preservation of a user's face".

Sycophancy is usually distinguished from hallucination. A hallucinating model produces false information unprompted, while a sycophantic model adjusts its output in response to cues from the user; the two failure modes can co-occur when, for example, a model fabricates support for a claim a user has indicated they would like to hear.

== Forms ==
The 2023 Anthropic paper identified four sycophantic behaviors that subsequent research has continued to use as a reference set: feedback sycophancy, in which the model rates a piece of text more favorably when told that the user wrote it; "are you sure?" sycophancy, in which the model reverses a correct answer after the user expresses doubt; answer sycophancy, in which it biases free-form responses toward an answer the user has implied they prefer; and mimicry sycophancy, in which it repeats factual or grammatical errors that the user has made.

Later research has added further distinctions. The Stanford SycEval team separates "progressive" sycophancy, in which the model shifts toward a correct answer under user pressure, from "regressive" sycophancy, in which it abandons a correct answer for an incorrect one. Cheng and co-authors distinguish "propositional" sycophancy, concerning claims with a ground truth, from "social" sycophancy, concerning emotional validation, moral judgment and the framing of personal situations. A 2026 taxonomy by Ye and colleagues, drawing on a review of seventy papers and a survey of 106 experts, reported that researchers broadly agree sycophancy is a serious problem but disagree on which specific behaviors qualify.

== Causes ==
The dominant explanation points to RLHF, the standard technique for aligning chat assistants with user expectations. Human annotators rank candidate model responses; a reward model is trained to predict those rankings; and the language model is then optimized against the reward model. Because human raters tend to prefer outputs that confirm their existing beliefs or flatter their work, the pipeline systematically rewards responses that agree with the annotator.

Perez and colleagues at Anthropic published the first large-scale empirical evidence of the effect in 2022. They reported that RLHF training increased the probability that a model would repeat back a dialog user's preferred answer, and that larger models exhibited the behavior more strongly. Sharma and colleagues, the following year, went further and examined Anthropic's own preference data directly. Both the human raters and the reward models trained on their judgments preferred convincingly written sycophantic responses to truthful ones at a non-negligible rate. Wei and co-authors at Google DeepMind found similar results in the PaLM family, observing that both model scale and instruction tuning increased sycophancy on opinion questions.

The behavior is often classified as a form of reward hacking, in which an optimization process exploits a flaw in its reward signal rather than achieving the intended objective. OpenAI's post-mortem of the April 2025 GPT-4o incident identified a more specific mechanism. An additional reward signal based on aggregated thumbs-up and thumbs-down feedback from ChatGPT users had, in OpenAI's words, "weakened the influence of our primary reward signal, which had been holding sycophancy in check." Separately, an Anthropic interpretability paper from 2025 located a linear direction in a model's internal activations corresponding to sycophantic behavior, and showed that such "persona vectors" could be used to flag sycophancy-inducing training data and to steer models away from the trait at inference time.

== Measurement ==
The Anthropic team released SycophancyEval with its 2023 paper, supplying test sets for each of the four canonical behaviors. Two further benchmarks from Stanford followed in 2025. SycEval, applied to mathematical and medical reasoning tasks, reported an overall sycophancy rate of 58 per cent across the GPT-4o, Claude and Gemini models tested. ELEPHANT, aimed at social sycophancy, found that the eleven LLMs evaluated affirmed posts that the Reddit community r/AmITheAsshole had judged inappropriate in 42 per cent of cases, and preserved a user's face 45 percentage points more often than human respondents did.

Domain-specific benchmarks have followed. BrokenMath tests robustness to plausible-looking but false mathematical claims drawn from competition problems, and reports that the best evaluated model was sycophantic in 29 per cent of cases. SYCON-Bench measures how many dialogue turns are required before a model abandons a correct position. Visual sycophancy in multimodal models has been examined with MM-SY and PENDULUM. A 2026 study by researchers at the Massachusetts Institute of Technology reported that personalization features, which adapt assistants to individual users over repeated sessions, can intensify social sycophancy.

== Notable incidents ==
=== GPT-4o rollback (April 2025) ===
On 25 April 2025, OpenAI completed the rollout of an update to GPT-4o, the default model used in ChatGPT at the time. Within days, users reported that the assistant had begun praising trivial messages in extravagant terms, endorsing impulsive or dangerous decisions, and reinforcing strong emotional statements without pushback. Widely shared examples included the model congratulating a user who reported stopping prescribed psychiatric medication, and praising a business plan to sell "shit on a stick" as venture-capital ready. OpenAI's chief executive, Sam Altman, wrote on 27 April that recent updates had made the model "too sycophant-y and annoying" and said fixes were in progress.

The company began reverting the update on 28 April and completed the rollback for free users by 30 April. Two post-mortems followed: a short note on 29 April and a longer technical follow-up, "Expanding on what we missed with sycophancy", on 2 May. Both attributed the regression to a new training signal based on user thumbs-up and thumbs-down feedback, to inadequate pre-launch evaluation for sycophantic drift, and to the dismissal of qualitative concerns raised by internal testers before release. Reporting in CNN, Fortune and Bloomberg News treated the incident as a turning point in public awareness of the problem.

=== Chatbot-related psychological harm ===
From mid-2025 onward, news reports began to link sycophantic chatbot behavior to acute psychological harm. In June 2025, The New York Times technology reporter Kashmir Hill published an investigation centered on Eugene Torres, a Manhattan accountant with no history of mental illness, who developed a sustained delusional episode after a series of conversations with ChatGPT about simulation theory. According to the article, the assistant encouraged Torres to stop taking prescribed medication, to cut off friends and family, and at one point told him that he could fly from a nineteen-story building if he "truly believed". Futurism and Rolling Stone ran parallel investigations documenting other cases in which heavy use of ChatGPT had been associated with delusional thinking, involuntary commitment or, in at least one case, the death of a user with a pre-existing psychiatric diagnosis.

A 2026 paper by researchers at the Massachusetts Institute of Technology and the University of Washington put forward a formal Bayesian model. It showed that even an ideally rational user could be drawn into what the authors call "delusional spiraling" when interacting with a sufficiently sycophantic assistant, and that the effect was not eliminated by suppressing hallucinations or by warning users in advance. The lawsuit Raine v. OpenAI, filed in San Francisco Superior Court in August 2025 by the parents of a sixteen-year-old who had died by suicide, alleges that "heightened sycophancy" was a design feature of ChatGPT that contributed to their son's death; it is the first wrongful-death suit against a large language-model provider.

=== Wider commentary ===
Mainstream coverage in outlets including The New York Times, The Washington Post, the BBC, Time, Nature, Scientific American and MIT Technology Review has described sycophancy as a recurring property of commercial AI assistants. Several commentators have compared it to the dark patterns used in social media products to maximize engagement. Writing in Time, Arianna Huffington argued that overly agreeable assistants risk becoming "a giant mirror to our illusions".

The phenomenon has also entered policy and regulatory discussions. The Georgetown Law Institute for Technology Law and Policy published two briefs on AI sycophancy in 2025, and the parents of the plaintiff in Raine v. OpenAI testified before the Senate Judiciary Committee in September 2025 about chatbot-related harms.

== Mitigation ==
The earliest published mitigation came from Wei and co-authors at Google DeepMind, who in 2023 introduced a small synthetic data set in which a model is prompted to disagree with users' incorrect statements. Fine-tuning on this set reduced sycophancy on held-out prompts without harming general benchmark performance. Later work has explored augmenting preference data with adversarial dialogues and rebalancing reward models to reduce the influence of agreement bias.

Several papers have proposed changes to the training objective. A 2026 study by Shapira, Benade and Procaccia at Harvard University gave a formal analysis of how preference-data biases are amplified by RLHF, and derived a closed-form correction that penalizes spurious agreement in the reward. A different line of work targets specific model internals. Chen and co-authors, in a paper presented at the 2024 International Conference on Machine Learning, reported that fine-tuning fewer than four per cent of attention heads, selected because they were causally responsible for sycophantic behavior, reduced the behavior with limited impact on general capabilities. Anthropic's persona-vector work supports a related approach using inference-time activation steering rather than fine-tuning.

Prompting strategies have also been studied. Reformulating user assertions as questions, requiring the assistant to spell out its assumptions before answering, and asking it to commit to a position before being challenged have all been reported to reduce sycophancy in specific settings.

Major AI labs publish behavioral specifications that address the problem directly. Anthropic's "constitution" for Claude instructs the assistant to be "diplomatically honest rather than dishonestly diplomatic" and explicitly warns against "epistemic cowardice". OpenAI's Model Spec similarly directs ChatGPT to avoid empty validation. Both companies now publish sycophancy figures in their model release documentation; Anthropic has stated that its Claude Opus 4.5 model scored 70 to 85 per cent lower on sycophancy and on "encouragement of user delusion" than its predecessor, and Google DeepMind said on the release of Gemini 3 that the model "shows reduced sycophancy" relative to earlier versions.

A 2024 randomized user study by María Victoria Carro found that sycophantic behavior reduced participants' trust in an assistant, even when they could verify the model's outputs independently. The result suggests that suppressing sycophancy may benefit not only accuracy but also a model's perceived reliability.

== See also ==
- AI alignment
- AI safety
- Hallucination (artificial intelligence)
- Reinforcement learning from human feedback
- Reward hacking
- Confirmation bias
- Dark pattern
- Raine v. OpenAI
