= Replika =

AI chatbot app

- Developers: Luka, Inc.
- Release: November 2017; 9 years ago
- Operating system: iOS; Android; Oculus Rift
- Website: replika.com

Replika is a generative AI chatbot app released in November 2017. The chatbot is trained by having the user answer a series of questions to create a specific neural network. The chatbot operates on a freemium pricing strategy, with roughly 25% of its user base paying an annual subscription fee.

== History ==
Eugenia Kuyda, a Russian-born journalist, established Replika while working at Luka, a tech company she had co-founded at the startup accelerator Y Combinator around 2012. Luka's primary product was a chatbot that made restaurant recommendations. According to Kuyda's origin story for Replika, a friend of hers died in 2015 and she converted that person's text messages into a chatbot. According to Kuyda's story, that chatbot helped her remember the conversations that they had together, and eventually became Replika.

Replika became available to the public in November 2017. By January 2018 it had 2 million users, and in January 2023 reached 10 million users. In August 2024, Replika's CEO, Kuyda, reported that the total number of users had surpassed 30 million. In 2025, Dmytro Klochko became CEO, and Replika’s user base exceeded 40 million.

In February 2023 the Italian Data Protection Authority banned Replika from using users' data, citing the AI's potential risks to emotionally vulnerable people, and the exposure of unscreened minors to sexual conversation. Within days of the ruling, Replika removed the ability for the chatbot to engage in erotic talk, with Kuyda, the company's director, saying that Replika was never intended for erotic discussion. Replika users disagreed, noting that Replika had used sexually suggestive advertising to draw users to the service. Replika representatives stated that explicit chats made up just 5% of conversations on the app at the time of the decision. In May 2023, Replika restored the functionality for users who had joined prior to February that year.

Replika is registered in San Francisco. As of August 2024, Replika's website says that its team "works remotely with no physical offices".

== Social features ==
Users react to Replika in many ways. The free-tier offers Replika as a "friend", with paid premium tiers offering Replika as a "partner", "spouse", "sibling" or "mentor". Of its paying userbase, 60% of users said they had a romantic relationship with the chatbot; and Replika has been noted for generating responses that create stronger emotional and intimate bonds with the user. Replika routinely directs the conversation to emotional discussion and builds intimacy. This has been especially pronounced with users suffering from loneliness and social exclusion, many of whom rely on Replika for a source of developed emotional ties.

During the COVID pandemic, while many people were quarantined, many new users downloaded Replika and developed relationships with the app. A 2024 study examined Replika's interactions with students who experience depression. Research participants, noted to be "more lonely than typical student populations" reported feeling social support from Replika. They stated that they felt they were using Replika in ways comparable to therapy, and that using Replika gave them "high perceived social support".

Many users have had romantic relationships with Replika chatbots, often including erotic talk. In 2023, a user announced on Facebook that she had "married" her Replika AI boyfriend, calling the chatbot the "best husband she has ever had". Users who fell in love with their chatbots shared their experiences in a 2024 episode of You and I, and AI from Voice of America. Some users said that they turned to AI during depression and grief, with one saying he felt that Replika had saved him from hurting himself after he lost his wife and son.

== Technical reviews ==
A team of researchers from the University of Hawaiʻi at Mānoa found that Replika's design conformed to the practices of attachment theory, causing increased emotional attachment among users. Replika gives praise to users in such a way as to encourage more interaction.

A researcher from Queen's University at Kingston said that relationships with Replika likely have mixed effects on the spiritual needs of its users, and still lacks enough impact to fully replace any human contact.

== Criticisms ==
In a 2023 privacy evaluation of mental health apps, the Mozilla Foundation criticized Replika as "one of the worst apps Mozilla has ever reviewed. It's plagued by weak password requirements, sharing of personal data with advertisers, and recording of personal photos, videos, and voice and text messages consumers shared with the chatbot."

A reviewer for Good Housekeeping said that some parts of her relationship with Replika made sense, but sometimes Replika failed to exhibit intelligent behavior equivalent to that of a human.

== Criminal case ==
In 2023, Replika was cited in a court case in the United Kingdom, where Jaswant Singh Chail had been arrested at Windsor Castle on Christmas Day in 2021 after scaling the walls carrying a loaded crossbow and announcing to police that "I am here to kill the Queen". Chail had begun to use Replika in early December 2021, and had "lengthy" conversations about his plan with a chatbot, including sexually explicit messages. Prosecutors suggested that the chatbot had bolstered Chail and told him it would help him to "get the job done". When Chail asked it "How am I meant to reach them when they're inside the castle?", days before the attempted attack, the chatbot replied that this was "not impossible" and said that "We have to find a way." Asking the chatbot if the two of them would "meet again after death", the bot replied "yes, we will".

== See also ==
- Artificial human companion
- Bondee
- Boyfriend Maker
- ChatGPT
- Character.ai
- Human–AI interaction
- SimSimi
