= Acta Neuropsychiatrica =

- Discipline: Neuropsychiatry
- Language: English
- Edited by: Gregers Wegener

Publication details
- History: 1989-present
- Publisher: Cambridge University Press on behalf of the Scandinavian College of Neuropsychopharmacology
- Frequency: Bimonthly
- Impact factor: 4.513 (2021)

Standard abbreviations
- ISO 4: Acta Neuropsychiatr.

Indexing
- ISSN: 0924-2708 (print); 1601-5215 (web)

Links
- Journal homepage

Acta Neuropsychiatrica is a bimonthly peer-reviewed medical journal covering research in neuropharmacology, neuropsychiatry, and neuroscience relevant to the pathophysiology, neurobiology, and treatment of neuropsychiatric disorders

== History ==
The journal was first published in September 1989 as the official publication of the Interdisciplinair Genootschap voor Biologische Psychiatrie (English: Interdisciplinary Society for Biological Psychiatry ). The journal was originally published by Uitgeverij De Medicus and Maarssen publishers almost entirely in the Dutch language until issue 14 in 2002, when the journal shifted publisher to Blackwell Munksgaard and the language became English.

The founding editor-in-chief was M.J.A.J.M. Hoes (1989–1999), followed by Michael Maes (2000–2005), Gin S. Malhi (2006–2011), and Gregers Wegener (2012-present).

The journal was published by John Wiley & Sons until 2012 and is now published by Cambridge University Press. In 2011, the journal became the official journal of the Scandinavian College of Neuropsychopharmacology.

The journal is abstracted and indexed in major bibliometric databases, including the Science Citation Index Expanded and Scopus.
