= Human-centered AI =

AI that learns human values

Human-centered AI is the initiative at the intersection of the fields of artificial intelligence (AI) and human-computer interaction (HCI) to develop AI systems in a way that prioritizes human values, needs, and general flourishing. Emphasis is placed on the recognition that artificial intelligence systems are rapidly changing, and will continue to influence, many aspects of the human experience, in areas ranging from scientific inquiry, governance and policy, labor and the economy, and creative expression, with an aim set to adapt current developments and guide future developments on a trajectory which is most beneficial to the human population at large, with the goal of augmenting human intelligence and capacities across these areas, as opposed to replacing them. Particular attention is paid to mitigating negative effects of AI automation on the livelihoods of the labor force, the use of AI in healthcare fields, and imbuing AI systems with societal values. Human-centered AI is linked to related endeavors in AI alignment and AI safety, but while these fields primarily focus on mitigating risks posed by AI that is unaligned to human values and/or uncontrollable AI self-development, human-centered AI places significant focus in exploring how AI systems can augment human capacities and serve as collaborators.

== Conceptual history ==
The importance of the alignment of artificial intelligence development towards human values in some sense predates artificial intelligence itself, as before the modern conception of artificial intelligence as coined at the 1956 Dartmouth Workshop, the conception of robots as constructed, autonomous agents entered the cultural consciousness as early as the 1920s, with Karel Capek's Rossum's Universal Robots. The imagined issues relating to robots' aims and values requiring intentional alignment and direction with those of humans followed soon after, most widely known from science fiction author Isaac Asimov’s Three Laws of Robotics, dating to his 1942 short story “Runaround”. Two of the three eponymous laws are directly concerned with robots’ interaction with and positioned deference towards humans, and have in recent times been reexamined in the face of modern AI. In 1985, after artificial intelligence research had taken off and its effects were more acutely conceptualized, Asimov added a Rule Zero, treating robots' relationship with humanity as a whole, distinct from individual humans. While modern artificial intelligence is largely distinct from robotics, the conceptualization of both robots and AI systems as autonomous agents positions this as a foundation for conceptions of human-centered AI.

Aside from robots, artificially intelligent autonomous agents in interaction with humans have been conceived of for at least 75 years. In 1950, Alan Turing published his famous "Imitation Game", often also called the Turing Test, a thought experiment that uses human-machine interaction as an assessor for the intelligence of a system. In recent times, artificial intelligence researchers such as Stanford's Erik Brynjolfsson have conceived of rapid AI development leading to a so-called "Turing Trap".

== Augmentation and automation ==
A major stated aim of human-centered AI is to promote the development of AI in ways that augment human capabilities, rather than replacing them. To this end, organizations and initiatives that take a human-centered approach to AI development focus on frameworks that encourage collaboration between humans and artificial intelligence systems to build towards even greater progress, rather than attempting to automate tasks currently handled by humans. Such avenues include everything from data visualization for big data, allowing human engineers to better understand extremely large datasets, allowing for the design of better machine learning models to handle them, to AI-powered sensors to monitor vitals, allowing for better responsiveness from healthcare providers.

Many human-centered AI initiatives often position it as a better alternative to the apparent mainstream in AI development, which is primarily concerned with automation. Driven by the pressures of the market economy, AI development that does replace tasks currently performed by humans with automated processes is incentivized, as it allows for greater profit margins; this often comes at the detriment of the human whose performance is replaced, thus leading to an environment wherein human workers are outcompeted by AI systems across various service-sector and technology-based industries. At the same time, automation and augmentation are not always incompatible; a major aim of human-centered AI is towards the automation of rote tasks that would otherwise hinder a human’s productivity or creativity, freeing them to direct their energy and intelligence towards higher-level tasks, thus achieving augmentation through automation.

Empirical research in pharmaceutical sales has shown that a human-centered implementation - where work procedures, training, and incentives are designed around individuals' cognitive needs - improves augmentation performance, while implementation without such adaptation can worsen outcomes relative to a legacy system.

== Research ==
Much of the work done on human-centered AI comes from research institutes, within universities, companies, and as freestanding organizations. The Stanford Institute for Human-Centered AI (abbreviated to HAI) is one such group, engaging academics, industry professionals, and policymakers centered in Stanford University to conduct research and inform policy in various areas in human-centered AI, including on aspects of the intelligence itself, augmentation, and on measuring the impacts of AI systems on sociopolitcal and cultural institutions. Similar groups exist at other universities, including the Chicago Human + AI (CHAI) Lab at the University of Chicago, the HCAI@GU group at the University of Gothenburg, and the Human-Centered AI (HAI) Lab at the University of Oxford. Outside of the academy, companies such as IBM have research initiatives dedicated to advancements in human-centered AI.

At Kenyon College, the Integrated Program for Humane Studies (IPHS) launched a human-centered AI program in 2016 integrating artificial intelligence research with humanities and social science inquiry. This approach treats computation and humanistic scholarship as a single unified field of research rather than as separate disciplines requiring collaboration. The program's researchers have published in both AI venues (such as the International Conference on Machine Learning and Frontiers of Computer Science) and humanities journals (such as PMLA and Poetics Today), and the lab was selected in December 2025 by Schmidt Sciences for its Humanities and AI Virtual Institute to apply AI methods to cultural heritage preservation.

Since 2020, Pepperdine University and its W. M. Keck Data Science Institute has organized the annual Human-Centered AI Conference to examine the impact of AI and how to best steward this technology for the common good of humanity. The event features keynote addresses from different fields, expert panels, workshops, and lectures examining AI through the lenses of robotics, neuroscience, ethics, and the world's religious traditions.
