= Death of Molly Russell =

Suicide of a British schoolgirl in 2017

In November 2017, Molly Russell, a fourteen-year-old British schoolgirl from Harrow, London, was found dead in her bedroom by her parents. In an inquest, the coroner stated that she had died from an act of self-harm following depression and the results of social media consumption, including material on Instagram and Pinterest. She also had a Twitter account in which she documented her growing depression.

== Life ==
Russell had been a pupil at Hatch End High School. At the inquest, the school's head teacher expressed shock that she was able to access distressing online content. Her parents stated that she had never shown any previous signs of struggle and was doing very well in school. It was revealed at the inquest that in the six months prior to her death, 2,100 of 16,300 pieces of content she had interacted with on Instagram were on topics such as self-harm, depression, and suicide. It was also noted that throughout her experience on social media, there were never any warning signs about the information she viewed on these platforms.

== Subsequent events ==
Dr. Navin Venugopal, the child psychiatrist assigned to the case investigating her death, called the material she viewed "disturbing and distressing" and said he was unable to sleep well for weeks after viewing it.

The coroner Andrew Walker concluded that Molly's death was "an act of self-harm whilst suffering from depression and the negative effects of online content". He issued a prevention of future deaths report regarding her death, in which he made a number of recommendations for operators of online platforms, including:

- separating platforms for adults and children
- age verification
- changes in policy on filtering of age-specific content
- adding features for parental supervision and control
- data retention of material viewed by children

He suggested that this could be accomplished by either legislation or self-regulation.

The lawyer representing her family at the inquest stated that the findings "captured all of the elements of why this material is so harmful." The case has been cited as a motivator for the passage of the Online Safety Act.

A charity, the Molly Rose Foundation, was set up in her memory, with the goal of suicide prevention for young people. Meta and Pinterest are believed to have made substantial donations to the charity.

== See also ==
- Suicide of Amanda Todd
- Social media optimization
- Suicidal ideation
- Problematic use of social media
