= Daniel De Freitas =

Research scientist, co-founder of Character.AI

Daniel De Freitas is a Brazilian computer scientist and entrepreneur specializing in conversational artificial intelligence. He is a co-founder of Character.AI, a chatbot platform, and is credited as a creator of Google's LaMDA language model and its predecessor Meena. As of 2026, he is a research scientist at Google DeepMind.

== Early life and education ==
De Freitas was born in São Paulo, Brazil, and earned a degree in computer engineering from the University of São Paulo (USP). He later completed coursework in machine learning and deep learning at Stanford University. He joined Microsoft in 2012, working on search and question-answering systems for Bing, and moved to Google in 2016, where he initially worked on machine learning for YouTube.

== Meena and LaMDA ==
While at Google, De Freitas began building a chatbot as a side project during his allotted "20% time," first experimenting with an LSTM architecture before switching to the Transformer architecture. The project became Meena, a 2.6-billion-parameter open-domain chatbot introduced in a January 2020 research paper and accompanied by a Google AI blog post. Google Brain then absorbed the project as an official research effort, and it was renamed LaMDA (Language Model for Dialogue Applications), a family of dialog models with up to 137 billion parameters. According to a Wall Street Journal investigation reported in 2023, Google executives repeatedly blocked De Freitas and his collaborator Noam Shazeer from releasing the technology publicly, citing safety and fairness concerns.

== Return to Google ==
In August 2024, Google signed an agreement reportedly worth about $2.7 billion that granted it a non-exclusive license to Character.AI's model technology and brought De Freitas, Shazeer, and a group of their researchers back to Google DeepMind. De Freitas rejoined DeepMind as a research scientist focused on dialogue and assistant systems, while Character.AI continued operating as an independent company. The deal's structure drew regulatory attention: in May 2025, the U.S. Department of Justice opened a civil antitrust investigation into whether such licensing-and-talent arrangements were designed to avoid formal merger review. The investigation was still ongoing as of early 2026. In June 2026, Shazeer left Google for OpenAI, while De Freitas remained at Google DeepMind.
