= SimSimi =

Chatbot app

- Developer: ISMaker (Kevin T Tan for Windows Phone version)
- Operating system: Web, Android, Windows Phone, iOS
- Size: 7.6 MB
- Website: simsimi.com

SimSimi is an artificial intelligence conversation program created in 2002 by ISMaker. It grows its artificial intelligence day by day assisted by a feature that allows users to teach it to respond correctly. SimSimi, pronounced as "shim-shimi", is from a Korean word simsim (심심) which means "bored". It has an application designed for Android, Windows Phone and iOS.

The application was banned in Thailand in 2012 after users taught it to make responses containing profanity, and to criticise leading politicians. In April 2018, SimSimi was suspended in Brazil due to accusations of sending inappropriate messages, such as sexual language, bullying and even death threats, being labeled as "dangerous" mainly due to its popularity among children, and according to its developer, the suspension of the app in the country "was inevitable because the SimSimi app, at least in the last few days, had a significant negative social impact in Brazil.”

== See also ==
- Chatterbot
- Artificial human companion
- List of chatbots
