= Sikhism and artificial intelligence =

Sikh perspectives on AI

While there is an argument that artificial intelligence (AI) will improve access to Sikh teachings, philosophy, and history, there are skeptics who believe the information provided may not be accurate. Furthermore, there are concerns regarding AI-generated images of Sikh personalities and their potential to offend members of the Sikh community. Usage of AI for Sikh purposes has been officially banned by the Akal Takht since late December 2025. Sikhs commonly use AI to access gurbani translation and learning, media generation, and virtual sangats, however concerns exist regarding simplification, commodification, accuracy,

== Potential uses and ethics ==
Artificial intelligence has the potential to overcome linguistic, geographical, and cultural barriers. Gamification and immersion can attract Sikh youth to engage with the religion. Ethical issues to usage relate to oversimplification and misrepresentation of the religion's philosophy, history, and scripture due to a lack of nuance. Another concern relates to commercialization, with the religion being commodified via gamification where practitioners expect rewards for partaking in the religion, turning such engagement into a transactional or superficial one. There are also concerns related to data collection and privacy, especially of minors. Algorithmic bias may favour English-languages sources when compared to content sourced from Punjabi or other languages. The generation of artificial images of Sikh topics may offend Sikhs or trivialize the religion.

According to Devinder Pal Singh, A.I. has the potential to improve access to Sikh writings (via translations, contextualization, and personalization), help preserve history (such as by digitizing Sikh texts), and increase connections on a global-scale. However, he warns that there is a risk that A.I. can misinterpret Sikh beliefs and practices and that it is controversial for a monetized software to be used vis-a-vis the Sikh religion, which espouses equality, with the risk that less financially well-off people may not be able to afford access to A.I., privacy and data concerns, and there is a risk of decreasing real-life, community bonds, such as at the gurdwara or langar. Devinder also warns against the militarization of AI and it exacerbating socio-wealth divides, unemployment, and surveillance but reiterates that the Sikh gurus were not against technological progress. Instead, as per Devinder the question that forms is in regards to if the AI is being used positively to uplift humanity as a whole or for the special interests of a select few (concentration of wealth) via exploitation of the masses, with Devinder tying the usage of AI to Sikh theological concepts, such as Sarbat da Bhala, Seva, Kirat Karni, and Naam. Devinder posits the hypothetical question asking if AI going to be a tool of humanity or its master. D. P. Singh has also written that the use of artificial intelligence may not be in agreement with Sikh ethics, as A.I. lacks a sense of spiritual consciousness does not possess a "sacred essence" that is found in humans. Hardev Singh Virk raised concerns about the technology and how it A.I. could not replicate humanity, as it does not possess bibek buddhi (spiritual intelligence) nor surat (consciousness). According to Harsimran Kaur and Daljit Kaur Gill, gurdwaras could integrate artificial intelligence to improve accessibility to the site and teachings and improve security and management. In 2024, Sikh Heritage British Columbia held a talk by Harjinder Singh Sandhu and Jujaar Singh on the impact of A.I. on Sikhs during Sikh Heritage Month.

Surpreet Singh of Everything's 13, who uses AI to generate videos relevant to Sikh history and theology, believes that the religion should keep up with technological advancement rather than shunning change and that the tech makes more accessible formerly difficult processes. Gurpreet Singh of SAGE Khalsa uses AI to connect Sikhs with their scriptural language, viewing AI as a way to keep translations and interpretations accessible to the public. Karina Skye Kaur cautions against the generation of artificial shabad kirtan by AI, seeing it as an imitation that lacks the substance based on intention and consciousness underlying human-created music. Thus, she views AI as potentially leading to illusion. Daljit Singh, one of the developers of KhalsaGPT, has warned that AI can create false information, known as hallucinations, thus as per him usage of AI for Sikh purposes requires careful oversight. He adds that verified information regarding the Sikh religion can be added to major AI platforms, to improve their accuracy in regards to Sikhism. Puneet Sahani has utilized A.I. for his projects regarding the Sikh religion.

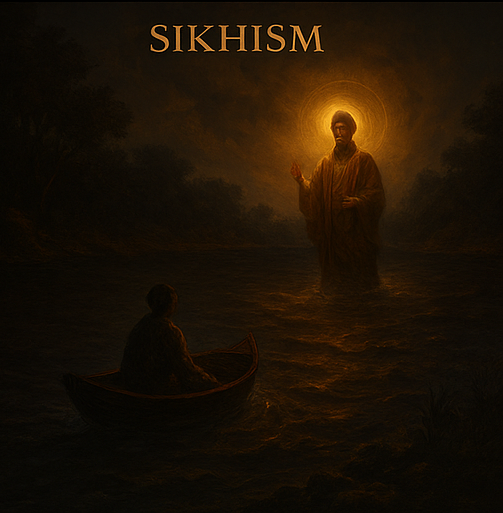
A.I.-generated image of the Vaitarani River in Sikhism, created using ChatGPT

In 2025, the Shiromani Gurdwara Parbandhak Committee has taken an opposing view over the usage of artificial intelligence for Sikhism, believing that the technology spreads misinformation on the religion, regarding Gurmat (Sikh philosophy), Gurbani (Sikh scripture), Sikh history, and the generation of images depicting Sikh figures. The S.G.P.C. has attempted to contact A.I. companies with their concerns and reached out to the central government regarding their concerns. The A.I. companies that the S.G.P.C. has expressed a concern with are namely ChatGPT, DeepSeek, Grok, Gemini AI, Meta, Google, VEO 3, Descript, Runway ML, Pictory, Magisto, InVideo, DALL·E 2, MidJourney, DeepAI, and others. The S.G.P.C. had earlier lodged a complaint against Dhruv Rathee for their usage of A.I. to generate images of the Sikh gurus.

== Ban ==
In a 28 December 2025 ruling, the Akal Takht banned the usage of artificial intelligence, animation, or cinematic imitation to portray Sikh gurus, their family members, Sikh warriors, martyrs, and sacred Sikh ceremonies. The SGPC formed a sub-committee and has also contacted AI companies in order to bring compliance to their AI-directives due to the proliferation of AI-content in Sikh social media spaces. The Sikh bodies have also requested the local government in Punjab to take action to prevent AI-generated content from depicting Sikh themes.

== Sikh artificial intelligence software ==
A Sikh-orientated A.I. software, named KhalsaGPT, claims to be the first Sikh artificial intelligence software, and was launched on 6 June 2023. It was developed by Daljit Singh, Ranbir Singh, and Rupinder Singh. KhalsaGPT was created to be a text-only educational platform, that does not permit generation of images depicting Sikh gurus or verses from the Guru Granth Sahib. However, development of KhalsaGPT has been paused since mid-2025. Another software, Sikh GPT also claims to be the first A.I. dedicated to Sikhism. Gianiji is a Sikh AI software developed by SAGE Khalsa which bridges the gap between languages and allows participants to ask questions and receive a response based on Sikh scripture. SikhNet and Gurbani Library have introduced AI-aided translation.

== See also ==
- Artificial intelligence in spirituality
- Buddhism and artificial intelligence
- Catholic Church and artificial intelligence
