= Tierra Común =

Latin American organization founded in 2020

Tierra Común (Common Earth) is a Latin American organization founded in 2020 by Paola Ricaurte Quijano, Nick Couldry and Ulises Ali Mejías. The organization brings together activists, citizens and researches who shares an decolonial gaze on data and technology. The group's main goal is to create ways to confront the data colonialism in the Global South, particularly in Latin America and the Caribbean, through initiatives such as courses, talks, training sessions, provision of materials, and others efforts. Tierra Común emphasizes that imagination is its greatest tool, aiming to create a future where humans life doesn't involve the extraction of data which discriminates and alienates people from their own lives.

== History ==
The idea to create the organization emerged months before the COVID-19 pandemic, when Nick Couldry made a talk about data colonialism in Mexico City. In that same day, talking with Paola Ricaurte, the researcher suggested giving more lectures, like the one that they were doing, around Latin America, since this is an topic of interest that is closely relevant to the region. The solution that they found was to create a simple website to gather and archive local events that reflect on data colonialism, encouraging local events, expanding the discussion archive and fostering solidarity in the resistance.

As of April 2026, the organization has held seven events, among them seminars, webinars, meetings and in-person discussion sessions.

	Name	Location	Date
Tierra Común 1	"Data Colonialism"	Bogotá	June 30, 2020
Tierra Común 2	"Disputing data colonialism from Central America"	San José, Costa Rica	September 17, 2020
Tierra Común 3	"Tierra Comúm: A Collective Agenda for the Future"	CDMX	October 28, 2021
Tierra Común 4	"Recoding Art"	London - CDMX - São Paulo	April 7, 2022
Tierra Común 5	"Technology and the Horizon of Autonomy - Technology and social struggle in Abya Yala"	CDMX	April - May, 2022
Tierra Común 6	"Femicide and the Production of counter-data"	Montevideo - London - Cambridge	August 9, 2022
Tierra Común 7	"Dialoguing about data: an audiobook on data colonialism"	Bogotá - Santiago - San-José - CDMX	June 2, 2025

== Aims ==
- To share perspectives, academic and practical, about data colonialism.
- To organize and promote initiatives around data colonialism and how to resist it.
- To build an archive of those initiatives.
- To collect together resources for the analysis of data colonialism and for resistance to it.
- To support a network of land defenders, activists, scholars, developers and artists concerned with data colonialism within and beyond Latin America.

== Data colonialism ==
For Tierra Común, data colonialism is understood as a new historical faze of colonialism that no longer focuses on the exploitation of land and natural resources, but rather on the appropriation of people's data to generate value. Big Techs use the historic power concentred in the Global North to extract this data globally, especially in regions with a weaker infrastructure, such as Africa and Latin America, reinforcing long-standing inequalities. This appropriation occur in an apparently consensual way, for example when one clicks "accept" on terms and conditions of use, which allows for the continuous extraction of data. This fuels a new stage of capitalism, also known as Surveillance Capitalism, which generate an extraordinary wealth for these companies and create new social relationships mediated by data, where the resource is people. From Tierra Común's perspective, this phenomenon is a new stage of colonialism that uses the power of technology to colonize human life.
