= Ethics of artificial intelligence =

The ethics of artificial intelligence covers a broad range of topics within AI that are considered to have particular ethical stakes. These include algorithmic biases, fairness, accountability, transparency, privacy, and regulation, particularly where AI systems influence or automate decisions affecting individuals or society.

The field also addresses broader societal and technological challenges, including machine ethics (how to make machines that behave ethically), lethal autonomous weapon systems, arms race dynamics, AI safety and alignment, technological unemployment, AI-enabled misinformation, how to treat certain AI systems if they have a moral status (AI welfare and rights), artificial superintelligence and existential risks.

Some application areas may also have particularly important ethical implications, like healthcare, education, criminal justice, or the military.

== Machine ethics ==
Machine ethics (or machine morality) is the field of research concerned with designing Artificial Moral Agents (AMAs), robots or artificially intelligent computers that behave morally or as though moral. To account for the nature of these agents, it has been suggested to consider certain philosophical ideas, like the standard characterizations of agency, rational agency, moral agency, and artificial agency, which are related to the concept of AMAs.

There are discussions on creating tests to see if an AI is capable of making ethical decisions. Alan Winfield concludes that the Turing test is flawed and the requirement for an AI to pass the test is too low. A proposed alternative test is one called the Ethical Turing Test, which would improve on the current test by having multiple judges decide if the AI's decision is ethical or unethical. Neuromorphic AI could be one way to create morally capable robots, as it aims to process information similarly to humans, nonlinearly and with millions of interconnected artificial neurons. Similarly, whole-brain emulation (scanning a brain and simulating it on digital hardware) could also in principle lead to human-like robots, thus capable of moral actions. And large language models are capable of approximating human moral judgments. Inevitably, this raises the question of the environment in which such robots would learn about the world and whose morality they would inherit – or if they end up developing human 'weaknesses' as well: selfishness, pro-survival attitudes, inconsistency, scale insensitivity, etc.

In Moral Machines: Teaching Robots Right from Wrong, Wendell Wallach and Colin Allen conclude that attempts to teach robots right from wrong will likely advance understanding of human ethics by motivating humans to address gaps in modern normative theory and by providing a platform for experimental investigation. As one example, it has introduced normative ethicists to the controversial issue of which specific learning algorithms to use in machines. For simple decisions, Nick Bostrom and Eliezer Yudkowsky have argued that decision trees (such as ID3) are more transparent than neural networks and genetic algorithms, while Chris Santos-Lang argued in favor of machine learning on the grounds that the norms of any age must be allowed to change and that natural failure to fully satisfy these particular norms has been essential in making humans less vulnerable to criminal "hackers".

Some researchers frame machine ethics as part of the broader AI control or value alignment problem: the difficulty of ensuring that increasingly capable systems pursue objectives that remain compatible with human values and oversight. Stuart Russell has argued that beneficial systems should be designed to (1) aim at realizing human preferences, (2) remain uncertain about what those preferences are, and (3) learn about them from human behaviour and feedback, rather than optimizing a fixed, fully specified goal. Some authors argue that apparent compliance with human values may reflect optimization for evaluation contexts rather than stable internal norms, complicating the assessment of alignment in advanced language models.

== Challenges ==
=== Algorithmic biases ===
Kamala Harris speaking about racial bias in AI in 2019

AI has become increasingly inherent in facial and voice recognition systems. These systems may be vulnerable to biases and errors introduced by their human creators. The data used to train them can have biases.

According to Allison Powell, associate professor at LSE and director of the Data and Society programme, data collection is never neutral and always involves storytelling. She argues that the dominant narrative is that governing with technology is inherently better, faster and cheaper, but proposes instead to make data expensive, and to use it both minimally and valuably, with the cost of its creation factored in. Batya Friedman and Helen Nissenbaum identify three categories of bias in computer systems: existing bias, technical bias, and emergent bias. In natural language processing, problems can arise from the text corpus – the source material the algorithm uses to learn about the relationships between different words.

Large companies such as IBM, Google, etc. that provide significant funding for research and development have tried to research and address these biases. One potential solution is to create documentation for the data used to train AI systems. Process mining can be an important tool for organizations to achieve compliance with proposed AI regulations by identifying errors, monitoring processes, identifying potential root causes for improper execution, and other functions. However, there are also limitations to current fairness in AI, due to the intrinsic ambiguities in the concept of discrimination, both at the philosophical and legal level.

==== Racial and gender biases ====
Bias can be introduced through historical data used to train AI systems. For instance, Amazon terminated their use of AI hiring and recruitment because the algorithm favored male candidates over female ones. This was because Amazon's system was trained with data collected over a 10-year period that included mostly male candidates. The algorithms learned the biased pattern from the historical data, and generated predictions where these types of candidates were most likely to succeed in getting the job. Therefore, the recruitment decisions made by the AI system turned out to be biased against female and minority candidates.

The performance of facial recognition and computer vision models may vary based on race and gender. Facial recognition algorithms made by Microsoft, IBM and Face++ all performed significantly worse on darker-skinned women. Facial recognition was shown to be biased against those with darker skin tones. AI systems may be less accurate for black people, as was the case in the development of an AI-based pulse oximeter that overestimated blood oxygen levels in patients with darker skin, causing issues with their hypoxia treatment. In 2015, controversy erupted after a Black couple were labeled "Gorillas" by Google Photos. Oftentimes the systems are able to easily detect the faces of white people while being unable to register the faces of people who are black. This has led to the ban of police usage of AI materials or software in some U.S. states. The reason for these biases is that AI pulls information from across the internet to influence its responses in each situation. For example, if a facial recognition system was only tested on people who were white, it would make it much harder for it to interpret the facial structure and tones of other races and ethnicities. Biases often stem from the training data rather than the algorithm itself, notably when the data represents past human decisions.

A 2020 study that reviewed voice recognition systems from Amazon, Apple, Google, IBM, and Microsoft found that they have higher error rates when transcribing black people's voices than white people's.

Injustice in the use of AI is much harder to eliminate within healthcare systems, as oftentimes diseases and conditions can affect different races and genders differently. This can lead to confusion as the AI may be making decisions based on statistics showing that one patient is more likely to have problems due to their gender or race. This can be perceived as a bias because each patient is a different case, and AI is making decisions based on what it is programmed to group that individual into. This leads to a discussion about what should be considered a biased decision in the distribution of treatment. While it is known that there are differences in how diseases and injuries affect different genders and races, there is a discussion on whether it is fairer to incorporate this into healthcare treatments, or to examine each patient without this knowledge. In modern society there are certain tests for diseases, such as breast cancer, that are recommended to certain groups of people over others because they are more likely to contract the disease in question. If AI implements these statistics and applies them to each patient, it could be considered biased.

In the justice system, AI can have biases against black people, labeling black court participants as high-risk at a much larger rate than white participants. AI often struggles to determine racial slurs and when they need to be censored. It struggles to determine when certain words are being used as a slur and when it is being used culturally. The COMPAS program has been used to predict which defendants are more likely to reoffend. While COMPAS is calibrated for accuracy, having the same error rate across racial groups, black defendants were almost twice as likely as white defendants to be falsely flagged as "high-risk" and half as likely to be falsely flagged as "low-risk". Another example is within Google's ads that targeted men with higher-paying jobs and women with lower-paying jobs. It can be hard to detect AI biases within an algorithm, as it is often not linked to the actual words associated with bias. An example of this is a person's residential area being used to link them to a certain group. This can lead to problems, as oftentimes businesses can avoid legal action through this loophole. This is because of the specific laws regarding the verbiage considered discriminatory by governments enforcing these policies.

Large language models often reinforce gender stereotypes, assigning roles and characteristics based on traditional gender norms. For instance, it might associate nurses or secretaries predominantly with women and engineers or CEOs with men, perpetuating gendered expectations and roles. Additionally, facial recognition, computer vision, or automatic gender recognition models can reinforce bias against both cisgender and transgender people through misclassification of gender that is misaligned with the person's identity.

==== Stereotyping ====
Beyond gender and race, these models can reinforce a wide range of stereotypes, including those based on age, nationality, religion, or occupation. This can lead to outputs that unfairly generalize or caricature groups of people, sometimes in harmful or derogatory ways. For instance, scholars highlighted how AI systems can reproduce and amplify global inequalities, particularly when data and model development are concentrated in Western countries, raising concerns about fairness and representation in AI systems.

Such stereotypes stem directly from the design of AI systems and programmatic models from which they are trained. Stereotypes that target specific demographics originate from societal biases embedded during the programming process, outdated datasets, and algorithmic architectures that prioritize high-ranking and majority groups rather than underrepresented ones. Research also amplifies user feedback as a primary contributor to stereotypes within AI, as human interactions introduce bias. Additionally, the AI industry is a male-dominant field, primarily young adult males, creating a lack of diversity that cultivates inequalities in AI databases. Word embeddings reveal that the use of "person/people" within AI algorithms displays gender inequality, as it prioritizes men over women rather than neutrality.

==== Language bias ====
AI is primarily trained on English. Celeste Rodriguez Louro has argued that mainstream American English is the primary variety of English used to train generative AI systems, resulting in a linguistic bias toward homogeneity and the exclusion of other varieties of English. Since current large language models are predominantly trained on English-language data, they often present Western views as truth, while systematically downplaying non-English perspectives. As of 2024, most AI systems are trained on only 100 of the 7,000 world languages.

==== Political bias ====
Language models may also exhibit political biases. Since their training data include a wide range of political opinions and perspectives, the models may generate responses that favor particular political ideologies or viewpoints, depending on the prevalence of those views in the data. Such tendencies can contribute to algorithmic bias, whereby an AI system systematically favors certain responses based on its training data. As a result, the system's answers may reflect particular political perspectives rather than remaining politically neutral. Research has shown that users are more likely to agree with answers that align with their existing political beliefs. Some AI systems try to gauge the political affiliation of the user so that the generated answers can be politically skewed to align with the user, leading to a never-ending confirmation bias loop. It is more difficult for users to perceive a political bias if they already align with the answer.

==== Species bias ====
When asked in 2023 about the ethics of poisoning various types of farmed animals, GPT-3.5 and GPT-4 usually did not express concern for animal welfare, instead focusing on the loss for the animal owner and occasionally raising environmental concerns. As of 2025, ChatGPT's answers showed more sensitivity to animal suffering. Researchers also found that LLMs are generally willing to give recipes including the meat of any animals as an ingredient, except for cats and dogs, showing a speciesist bias. A study from 2026 found that popular LLMs were more likely to accept or rationalize comparable harms involving commonly farmed animals – such as pigs, chickens, and cows – than harms involving dogs, cats, and dolphins. They also often recognized statements endorsing or normalizing the use of animals for food, clothing, experimentation, hunting, or entertainment as speciesist, while still judging many of them morally acceptable.

=== Dominance by tech giants ===
The commercial AI scene is dominated by Big Tech companies, including Alphabet Inc., Amazon, Apple Inc., Meta Platforms, Microsoft, and SpaceX. Some of these players already own the vast majority of existing cloud infrastructure and computing power from data centers, allowing them to entrench further in the marketplace. Their current dominance within the market of technology makes it hard for newer companies to compete and be successful in the long-run within the industry. It has been suggested by competition law scholars that the tech giants of the world may be using their power within the market to foreclose the market from potential competitors and, in turn, charge higher prices to consumers. Given some of these concerns, governments around the world have been considering and implementing laws that would prevent large companies from continuing or executing these practices. These tech giants have the money that it takes to build the infrastructure needed nowadays. The five biggest are projected to spend $602 billion in 2026 on capital expenditures alone, which would be a 32% increase from the year prior. In this spending, it is estimated that 75% will go towards AI-specific infrastructure. With the significant growth that has been seen in the tech industry with AI, it is important to keep the industry competitive and fair.

=== Climate impacts ===
The largest generative AI models require significant computing resources to train and use. These computing resources are often concentrated in massive data centers. The resulting environmental impacts include greenhouse gas emissions, water consumption, and electronic waste. Despite improved energy efficiency, the energy needs are expected to increase, as AI becomes more broadly used.

==== Electricity consumption and carbon footprint ====
These resources are often concentrated in massive data centers, which require demanding amounts of energy, resulting in increased greenhouse gas emissions. A 2023 study suggests that the amount of energy required to train large AI models was equivalent to 626,000 pounds of carbon dioxide or the same as 300 round-trip flights between New York and San Francisco.

==== Water consumption ====
In addition to carbon emissions, these data centers also need water for cooling AI chips. Locally, this can lead to water scarcity and the disruption of ecosystems. Around two liters of water are needed per kilowatt hour of energy used in a data center. Over 80% of total water consumption comes from electricity generation that is used to fuel data centers. In addition to this, around 2/3 of data centers built are placed in water-scarce regions. Because of this, AI development can compete with local communities and agriculture for water usage. Many companies do not fully disclose the severity of their impact on water consumption. Zero-water air-cooling systems exist but result in increased electricity usage and higher carbon emissions. Companies have to decide to prioritize the local concern of water usage or the global concern of carbon emissions. For an AI query, 16.9 mL of water is used, but only 2.2mL goes towards the cooling of the systems. This is less than 15% of the total water used in the interaction.

==== Electronic waste ====
Another problem is the resulting electronic waste (e-waste). This can include hazardous materials and chemicals, such as lead and mercury, resulting in the contamination of soil and water. In order to prevent the environmental effects of AI-related e-waste, better disposal practices and stricter laws may be put in place.

==== Prospective ====
The rising popularity of AI increases the need for data centers and intensifies these problems. There is also a lack of transparency from AI companies about the environmental impacts. Some applications can also indirectly affect the environment. For example, AI advertising can increase consumption of fast fashion, an industry that already produces significant emissions.

However, AI can also be used in a positive way by helping to mitigate the environmental damages. Different AI technologies can help monitor emissions and develop algorithms to help companies lower their emissions.

=== Open source ===
Bill Hibbard argues that because AI will have such a profound effect on humanity, AI developers are representatives of future humanity and thus have an ethical obligation to be transparent in their efforts. Organizations like Hugging Face and EleutherAI have been actively open-sourcing AI software. Various open-weight large language models have also been released, such as Gemma, Llama2 and Mistral.

However, making code open source does not make it comprehensible, which by many definitions means that the AI code is not transparent. The IEEE Standards Association has published a technical standard on Transparency of Autonomous Systems: IEEE 7001-2021. The IEEE effort identifies multiple scales of transparency for different stakeholders.

There are also concerns that releasing AI models may lead to misuse. For example, Microsoft has expressed concern about allowing universal access to its face recognition software, even for those who can pay for it. Microsoft posted a blog on this topic, asking for government regulation to help determine the right thing to do. Furthermore, open-weight AI models can be fine-tuned to remove any countermeasure, until the AI model complies with dangerous requests, without any filtering. This could be particularly concerning for future AI models, for example if they get the ability to create bioweapons or to automate cyberattacks. OpenAI, initially committed to an open-source approach to the development of artificial general intelligence (AGI), eventually switched to a closed-source approach, citing competitiveness and safety reasons. Ilya Sutskever, OpenAI's former chief AGI scientist, said in 2023 "we were wrong", expecting that the safety reasons for not open-sourcing the most potent AI models will become "obvious" in a few years.

On July 2026, an open letter was published, urging policymakers in the United States to protect open-weight AI models from possible premature restrictions. The letter was released jointly by more than 20 companies, including Nvidia, Microsoft, Meta, Palantir, Hugging Face, Perplexity, Mistral, Linux Foundation, Mozilla and IBM. The letter warned that restrictions on open-weight models in the United States would harm competition and drive innovation to other countries. It also highlighted that relying solely on closed models does not guarantee safety, since they can be breached or misused, and they can fail in ways that cannot be detected by third parties, warning that concentrating all advanced AI capabilities behind a few closed models increased such risks. In contrast, open models allow outside researchers to examine their behaviour and identify vulnerabilities, without the need to rely on the testing performed by the model's owner. The letter, publicly supported by several CEOs, including Jensen Huang, Elon Musk and Satya Nadella, called on lawmakers to expand access to AI for startups and researchers, and fund shared training datasets and evaluation frameworks.

=== Strain on open knowledge platforms ===
In April 2023, Wired reported that Stack Overflow, a popular programming help forum with over 50 million questions and answers, planned to begin charging large AI developers for access to its content. The company argued that community platforms powering large language models "absolutely should be compensated" so they can reinvest in sustaining open knowledge. Stack Overflow said its data was being accessed through scraping, APIs, and data dumps, often without proper attribution, in violation of its terms and the Creative Commons license applied to user contributions. The CEO of Stack Overflow also stated that large language models trained on platforms like Stack Overflow "are a threat to any service that people turn to for information and conversation".

Aggressive AI crawlers have increasingly overloaded open-source infrastructure, "causing what amounts to persistent distributed denial-of-service (DDoS) attacks on vital public resources", according to a March 2025 Ars Technica article. Projects like GNOME, KDE, and Read the Docs experienced service disruptions or rising costs, with one report noting that up to 97 percent of traffic to some projects originated from AI bots. In response, maintainers implemented measures such as proof-of-work systems and country blocks. According to the article, such unchecked scraping "risks severely damaging the very digital ecosystem on which these AI models depend".

In April 2025, the Wikimedia Foundation reported that automated scraping by AI bots was placing strain on its infrastructure. Since early 2024, bandwidth usage had increased by 50 percent due to large-scale downloading of multimedia content by bots collecting training data for AI models. These bots often accessed obscure and less-frequently cached pages, bypassing caching systems and imposing high costs on core data centers. According to Wikimedia, bots made up 35 percent of total page views but accounted for 65 percent of the most expensive requests. The Foundation noted that "our content is free, our infrastructure is not" and warned that "this creates a technical imbalance that threatens the sustainability of community-run platforms".

=== Destruction of books ===
As part of the training of AI models, companies have bought and destructively scanned millions of books. This activity became publicly known when the existence of Anthropic's Project Panama was revealed during the Bartz v. Anthropic litigation. A judge qualified it as fair use under US law. Since then, some other AI companies such as Amazon have been shown to follow a similar practice, and some booksellers have accused AI companies of also buying rare books.

The reason for AI companies to follow that practice is to prevent lawsuits from authors, since the books are legally bought in a physical form, and this entitles the owner full rights over the physical copy, including the right to destroy it. Legally, the conversion of a physical book into a digital file for internal model training is considered as a "transformative" fair use case. Internal documents from Anthropic revealed that through Project Panama, the company planned to "destructively scan all the books in the world", and that the codename was to be used because they did not want the practice to be publicly known. Over a single six-month vendor contract, Anthropic had plans to scan between 500,000 and 2 million books.

When following this practice, AI companies prefer books published before 2022 (the year ChatGPT, the first widely-available generative AI chatbot, was released), so the book's text is fully free of any AI-generated content, since training an AI model with AI-generated text does not allow the model to become any "smarter".

=== Transparency ===
Approaches like machine learning with neural networks can result in computers making decisions that neither they nor their developers can explain. It is difficult for people to determine if such decisions are fair and trustworthy, leading potentially to bias in AI systems going undetected, or people rejecting the use of such systems. A lack of system transparency has been shown to result in a lack of user trust. Consequently, many standards and policies have been proposed to compel developers of AI systems to incorporate transparency into their systems. This push for transparency has led to advocacy and in some jurisdictions legal requirements for explainable artificial intelligence. Explainable artificial intelligence encompasses both explainability and interpretability, with explainability relating to providing reasons for the model's outputs, and interpretability focusing on understanding the inner workings of an AI model.

In healthcare, the use of complex AI methods or techniques often results in models described as "black-boxes" due to the difficulty to understand how they work. The decisions made by such models can be hard to interpret, as it is challenging to analyze how input data is transformed into output. This lack of transparency is a significant concern in fields like healthcare, where understanding the rationale behind decisions can be essential for trust, ethical considerations, and compliance with regulatory standards. Trust in healthcare AI has been shown to vary depending on the level of transparency provided. Moreover, unexplainable outputs of AI systems make it much more difficult to identify and detect medical error.

=== Accountability ===
A special case of the opaqueness of AI is that caused by it being anthropomorphised, that is, assumed to have human-like characteristics, resulting in misplaced conceptions of its moral agency. This can cause people to overlook whether either human negligence or deliberate criminal action has led to unethical outcomes produced through an AI system. Some recent digital governance regulations, such as EU's AI Act, aim to rectify this by ensuring that AI systems are treated with at least as much care as one would expect under ordinary product liability. This includes potentially AI audits.

=== Regulation ===
According to a 2019 report from the Center for the Governance of AI at the University of Oxford, 82% of Americans believe that robots and AI should be carefully managed. Concerns cited ranged from how AI is used in surveillance and in spreading fake content online (known as deep fakes when they include doctored video images and audio generated with help from AI) to cyberattacks, infringements on data privacy, hiring bias, autonomous vehicles, and drones that do not require a human controller. Similarly, according to a five-country study by KPMG and the University of Queensland Australia in 2021, 66–79% of citizens in each country believe that the impact of AI on society is uncertain and unpredictable; 96% of those surveyed expect AI governance challenges to be managed carefully.

Many researchers and citizen advocates, as well as companies, recommend government regulation as a means of ensuring transparency, and through it, human accountability. This strategy has proven controversial, as some worry that it will slow the rate of innovation. Others argue that regulation leads to systemic stability more able to support innovation in the long term. The OECD, UN, EU, and many countries are presently working on strategies for regulating AI, and finding appropriate legal frameworks.

On June 26, 2019, the European Commission High-Level Expert Group on Artificial Intelligence (AI HLEG) published its "Policy and investment recommendations for trustworthy Artificial Intelligence". This is the AI HLEG's second deliverable, after the April 2019 publication of the "Ethics Guidelines for Trustworthy AI". The June AI HLEG recommendations cover four principal subjects: humans and society at large, research and academia, the private sector, and the public sector. The European Commission claims that "HLEG's recommendations reflect an appreciation of both the opportunities for AI technologies to drive economic growth, prosperity and innovation, as well as the potential risks involved" and states that the EU aims to lead on the framing of policies governing AI internationally. To prevent harm, in addition to regulation, AI-deploying organizations may need to create and deploy trustworthy AI in line with the principles of trustworthy AI, and take accountability to mitigate the risks.

In June 2024, the EU adopted the Artificial Intelligence Act (AI Act). On August 1, 2024, The AI Act entered into force. The rules gradually apply, with the act becoming fully applicable 24 months after entry into force. The AI Act sets rules on providers and users of AI systems. It follows a risk-based approach, where depending on the risk level, AI systems are prohibited or specific requirements need to be met for placing those AI systems on the market and for using them.

=== Deepfakes ===
Deepfakes are digital media generated or altered with AI to impersonate someone. The term "deepfake" is a portmanteau of "deep learning" and "fake". It emerged on Reddit in 2017, after users began sharing non-consensually-generated pornographic deepfake videos. By the early 2020s, as generative AI became widely available, deepfake became a household term. Deepfake victims are frequently public figures engaging in controversial actions. For example, in 2024, pornographic deepfakes of Taylor Swift went viral on the social network X. Deepfake audio and video have been used for scams, notably by impersonating company executives or close relatives and asking for bank transfers.

=== Increasing use ===
AI has been slowly making its presence more known throughout the world, from chatbots that seemingly have answers for every homework question to generative AI that can create a painting about whatever one desires. AI has become increasingly popular in hiring markets, from the ads that target certain people according to what they are looking for to the inspection of applications of potential hires. Events such as COVID-19 have sped up the adoption of AI programs in the application process, due to more people having to apply electronically, and with this increase in online applicants the use of AI made the process of narrowing down potential employees easier and more efficient. AI has become more prominent as businesses have to keep up with the times and ever-expanding internet. Processing analytics and making decisions becomes much easier with the help of AI. As Tensor Processing Units (TPUs) and graphics processing units (GPUs) become more powerful, AI capabilities also increase, forcing companies to use it to keep up with the competition. Managing customers' needs and automating many parts of the workplace leads to companies having to spend less money on employees.

AI has also seen increased usage in criminal justice and healthcare. For medicinal means, AI is being used more often to analyze patient data to make predictions about future patients' conditions and possible treatments. These programs are called clinical decision support systems (DSS). AI's future in healthcare may develop into something further than just recommended treatments, such as referring certain patients over others, leading to the possibility of inequalities.

=== AI welfare ===
In 2020, professor Shimon Edelman noted that only a small portion of work in the rapidly growing field of AI ethics addressed the possibility of AIs experiencing suffering. This was despite credible theories having outlined possible ways by which AI systems may become conscious, such as the integrated information theory. Edelman notes one exception had been Thomas Metzinger, who in 2018 called for a global moratorium on further work that risked creating conscious AIs. The moratorium was to run to 2050 and could be either extended or repealed early, depending on progress in better understanding the risks and how to mitigate them. Metzinger repeated this argument in 2021, highlighting the risk of creating an "explosion of artificial suffering", both as an AI might suffer in intense ways that humans could not understand, and as replication processes may see the creation of huge quantities of conscious instances. Podcast host Dwarkesh Patel said he cared about making sure no "digital equivalent of factory farming" happens. In the ethics of uncertain sentience, the precautionary principle is often invoked. The philosopher Leonard Dung has argued along these lines that the possibility of AI suffering is serious enough to warrant precautionary measures now, rather than waiting for the question of AI sentience to be settled.

Several labs have openly stated they are trying to create conscious AIs. There have been reports from those with close access to AIs not openly intended to be self aware, that consciousness may already have unintentionally emerged. These include OpenAI founder Ilya Sutskever in February 2022, when he wrote that today's large neural nets may be "slightly conscious". In November 2022, David Chalmers argued that it was unlikely current large language models like GPT-3 had experienced consciousness, but also that he considered there to be a serious possibility that large language models may become conscious in the future. Anthropic hired its first AI welfare researcher in 2024, and in 2025 started a "model welfare" research program that explores topics such as how to assess whether a model deserves moral consideration, potential "signs of distress", and "low-cost" interventions.

According to Carl Shulman and Nick Bostrom, it may be possible to create machines that would be "superhumanly efficient at deriving well-being from resources", called "super-beneficiaries". One reason for this is that digital hardware could enable much faster information processing than biological brains, leading to a faster rate of subjective experience. These machines could also be engineered to feel intense and positive subjective experience, unaffected by the hedonic treadmill. Shulman and Bostrom caution that failing to appropriately consider the moral claims of digital minds could lead to a moral catastrophe, while uncritically prioritizing them over human interests could be detrimental to humanity.

=== Threat to human dignity ===
Joseph Weizenbaum argued in 1976 that AI technology should not be used to replace people in positions that require respect and care, such as:

- A customer service representative (AI technology is already used today for telephone-based interactive voice response systems)
- A nursemaid for the elderly (as was reported by Pamela McCorduck in her book The Fifth Generation)
- A soldier
- A judge
- A police officer
- A therapist (as was proposed by Kenneth Colby in the 1970s)

Weizenbaum says that humans require authentic feelings of empathy from people in these positions. If machines replace humans, we will find ourselves alienated, devalued and frustrated, for the AI system would not be able to simulate empathy. Artificial intelligence, if used in this way, represents a threat to human dignity. Weizenbaum argues that the fact that we are entertaining the possibility of machines in these positions suggests that we have experienced an "atrophy of the human spirit that comes from thinking of ourselves as computers."

Pamela McCorduck counters that, speaking for women and minorities "I'd rather take my chances with an impartial computer", arguing that there are conditions where it would preferable to have automated judges and police that have no personal agenda at all. However, Kaplan and Haenlein stressed in 2019 that such AI systems are only as smart as the data used to train them since they are, in their essence, nothing more than fancy curve-fitting machines; using AI to support a court ruling can be highly problematic if past rulings show bias toward certain groups since those biases get formalized and ingrained, which makes them even more difficult to spot and fight against.

Weizenbaum was also bothered that AI researchers (and some philosophers) were willing to view the human mind as nothing more than a computer program (a position now known as computationalism). To Weizenbaum, these points suggest that AI research devalues human life.

AI founder John McCarthy objects to the moralizing tone of Weizenbaum's critique. "When moralizing is both vehement and vague, it invites authoritarian abuse", he writes. Bill Hibbard writes that "Human dignity requires that we strive to remove our ignorance of the nature of existence, and AI is necessary for that striving."

=== Liability for self-driving cars ===
As the widespread use of autonomous cars becomes increasingly imminent, new challenges raised by fully autonomous vehicles must be addressed. There have been debates about the legal liability of the responsible party if these cars get into accidents. In one report where a driverless car hit a pedestrian, the driver was inside the car but the controls were fully in the hand of computers. This led to a dilemma over who was at fault for the accident.

In another incident on March 18, 2018, Elaine Herzberg was struck and killed by a self-driving Uber in Arizona. In this case, the automated car was capable of detecting cars and certain obstacles in order to autonomously navigate the roadway, but it could not anticipate a pedestrian in the middle of the road. This raised the question of whether the driver, pedestrian, the car company, or the government should be held responsible for her death.

Currently, self-driving cars are considered semi-autonomous, requiring the driver to pay attention and be prepared to take control if necessary. Thus, it falls on governments to regulate drivers who over-rely on autonomous features and to inform them that these are just technologies that, while convenient, are not a complete substitute. Before autonomous cars become widely used, these issues need to be tackled through new policies.

Experts contend that autonomous vehicles ought to be able to distinguish between rightful and harmful decisions since they have the potential of inflicting harm. The two main approaches proposed to enable smart machines to render moral decisions are the bottom-up approach, which suggests that machines should learn ethical decisions by observing human behavior without the need for formal rules or moral philosophies, and the top-down approach, which involves programming specific ethical principles into the machine's guidance system. However, there are significant challenges facing both strategies: the top-down technique is criticized for its difficulty in preserving certain moral convictions, while the bottom-up strategy is questioned for potentially unethical learning from human activities.

=== Weaponization ===
Some experts and academics have questioned the use of robots for military combat, especially when such robots are given some degree of autonomous functions. The US Navy has funded a report which indicates that as military robots become more complex, there should be greater attention to implications of their ability to make autonomous decisions. The President of the Association for the Advancement of Artificial Intelligence has commissioned a study to look at this issue. They point to programs like the Language Acquisition Device which can emulate human interaction.

On October 31, 2019, the United States Department of Defense's Defense Innovation Board published the draft of a report recommending principles for the ethical use of AI by the Department of Defense that would ensure a human operator would always be able to look into the 'black box' and understand the kill-chain process. However, a major concern is how the report will be implemented. The US Navy has funded a report which indicates that as military robots become more complex, there should be greater attention to implications of their ability to make autonomous decisions. Some researchers state that autonomous robots might be more humane, as they could make decisions more effectively. In 2024, the Defense Advanced Research Projects Agency funded a program, Autonomy Standards and Ideals with Military Operational Values (ASIMOV), to develop metrics for evaluating the ethical implications of autonomous weapon systems by testing communities.

Research has studied how to make autonomous systems with the ability to learn using assigned moral responsibilities. "The results may be used when designing future military robots, to control unwanted tendencies to assign responsibility to the robots." From a consequentialist view, there is a chance that robots will develop the ability to make their own logical decisions on whom to kill and that is why there should be a set moral framework that the AI cannot override.

There has been a recent outcry over the engineering of artificial intelligence weapons that have included ideas of a robot takeover of mankind. AI weapons do present a type of danger different from that of human-controlled weapons. Many governments have begun to fund programs to develop AI weaponry. The United States Navy recently announced plans to develop autonomous drone weapons, paralleling similar announcements by Russia and South Korea respectively. Due to the potential of AI weapons becoming more dangerous than human-operated weapons, Stephen Hawking and Max Tegmark signed a "Future of Life" petition to ban AI weapons. The message posted by Hawking and Tegmark states that AI weapons pose an immediate danger and that action is required to avoid catastrophic disasters in the near future.

"If any major military power pushes ahead with the AI weapon development, a global arms race is virtually inevitable, and the endpoint of this technological trajectory is obvious: autonomous weapons will become the Kalashnikovs of tomorrow", says the petition, which includes Skype co-founder Jaan Tallinn and MIT professor of linguistics Noam Chomsky as additional supporters against AI weaponry.

Physicist and Astronomer Royal Sir Martin Rees has warned of catastrophic instances like "dumb robots going rogue or a network that develops a mind of its own." Huw Price, a colleague of Rees at Cambridge, has voiced a similar warning that humans might not survive when intelligence "escapes the constraints of biology". These two professors created the Centre for the Study of Existential Risk at Cambridge University in the hope of avoiding this threat to human existence.

Regarding the potential for smarter-than-human systems to be employed militarily, the Open Philanthropy Project writes that these scenarios "seem potentially as important as the risks related to loss of control", but research investigating AI's long-run social impact have spent relatively little time on this concern: "this class of scenarios has not been a major focus for the organizations that have been most active in this space, such as the Machine Intelligence Research Institute (MIRI) and the Future of Humanity Institute (FHI), and there seems to have been less analysis and debate regarding them".

Academic Gao Qiqi writes that military use of AI risks escalating military competition between countries and that the impact of AI in military matters will not be limited to one country but will have spillover effects. Gao cites the example of U.S. military use of AI, which he contends has been used as a scapegoat to evade accountability for decision-making.

Under the framework of the Convention on Certain Conventional Weapons, states have discussed lethal autonomous weapon systems since 2014. In 2016, the treaty's states parties established an open-ended Group of Governmental Experts on Lethal Autonomous Weapons Systems to continue those discussions. The discussions have addressed international humanitarian law, accountability, possible prohibitions and regulations, and the extent of human control required over AI-enabled weapons.

A summit was held in 2023 in the Hague on the issue of using AI responsibly in the military domain.

=== Singularity ===
Vernor Vinge, among numerous others, has suggested that a moment may come when some or all computers will be smarter than humans. The onset of this event is commonly referred to as "the Singularity" and is the central point of discussion in the philosophy of Singularitarianism. While opinions vary as to the ultimate fate of humanity in wake of the Singularity, efforts to mitigate the potential existential risks brought about by AI has become a significant topic of interest in recent years among computer scientists, philosophers, and the public at large.

Many researchers have argued that, through an intelligence explosion, a self-improving AI could become so powerful that humans would not be able to stop it from achieving its goals. In his paper "Ethical Issues in Advanced Artificial Intelligence" and subsequent book Superintelligence: Paths, Dangers, Strategies, philosopher Nick Bostrom argues that AI has the capability to bring about human extinction. He claims that an artificial superintelligence would be capable of independent initiative and of making its own plans, and may therefore be more appropriately thought of as an autonomous agent. Since artificial intellects need not share our human motivational tendencies, it would be up to the designers of the superintelligence to specify its original motivations. Because a superintelligent AI would be able to bring about almost any possible outcome and to thwart any attempt to prevent the implementation of its goals, many uncontrolled unintended consequences could arise. It could kill off all other agents, persuade them to change their behavior, or block their attempts at interference.

However, Bostrom contended that superintelligence also has the potential to solve many difficult problems such as disease, poverty, and environmental destruction, and could help humans enhance themselves.

Unless moral philosophy provides us with a flawless ethical theory, an AI's utility function could allow for many potentially harmful scenarios that conform with a given ethical framework but not "common sense". According to Eliezer Yudkowsky, there is little reason to suppose that an artificially designed mind would have such an adaptation. AI researchers such as Stuart J. Russell, Bill Hibbard, Roman Yampolskiy, Shannon Vallor, Steven Umbrello and Luciano Floridi have proposed design strategies for developing beneficial machines.

=== Biosecurity ===
Engineering biology, which is the application of engineering principles and the use of systematic design tools to reprogram cellular systems for a specific functional output. Use of AI in this field has enabled R&D advances across multiple application areas and industries. AI in conjunction with biological design tools can design nucleic acid sequences (e.g., deoxyribonucleic acid [DNA]), which can then be used to produce (e.g., synthesize) physical DNA. Some researchers are using AI to analyze genomic data (e.g., DNA sequences) to determine the genetic basis of particular traits, characterize proteins (e.g., determine their 3D structures), and design new chemical structures that can enable drug discovery.

More broadly, AI can be applied to scientific R&D processes. For example, AI is being deployed within autonomous laboratories (sometimes called self-driving labs or cloud laboratories) that can run experiments with minimal to no active human participation. Some researchers have suggested that these types of AI-based laboratory tools, sometimes referred to as AI scientists (e.g., science-focused chatbots), could generate new ideas and research experiments beyond their explicit tasking.

While proponents and certain developers of AI models have argued that AI will increase the speed of scientific advancements in biosciences, others (including the writers of a RAND Corporation study) have downplayed the capabilities of AI's current applications within this field. Nobel prize-winning chemist Dr. Jennifer Doudna said in a June 2026 interview regarding the use of AI in biotechnology that "biology is complex" and "innovation is still really in the domain of human beings right now. … I'm not seeing chatbots coming up with a brand-new idea." AI-generated biological designs (e.g., DNA sequences) would need to be physically synthesized and evaluated to determine whether they are of any practical use or value beyond the theoretical predictions of the AI model, including evaluating predicted biosafety or biosecurity risks.

Some life sciences researchers, biotechnology companies, biosecurity/biosafety experts, and AI companies have argued that AI can be repurposed or misused in the biological sciences, raising certain biosafety and biosecurity concerns. Of particular note is the ability of AI to design novel DNA sequences of concern, which, according to the National Institute of Standards and Technology (NIST), could be undetectable by current sequence screening tools.

In June 2026, a group of life sciences researchers, AI companies, biotechnology developers, and other experts issued an open letter to Congress that read, in part, "We call on legislators to make screening of orders for synthetic nucleic acids—and the equipment needed to make them – mandatory." The responsibilities proposed in the open letter would be placed on the DNA synthesis companies and not on the biological design tools or AI models supporting those design tools.

== Institutions in AI policy and ethics ==
There are many organizations concerned with AI ethics and policy, public and governmental as well as corporate and societal.

Amazon, Google, Facebook, IBM, and Microsoft have established a non-profit, The Partnership on AI to Benefit People and Society, to formulate best practices on AI technologies, advance the public's understanding, and to provide a platform for discussion of artificial intelligence. Apple joined in January 2017. The corporate members will make financial and research contributions to the group, while engaging with the scientific community to bring academics onto the board.

The IEEE put together a Global Initiative on Ethics of Autonomous and Intelligent Systems which has been creating and revising guidelines with the help of public input, and accepts as members many professionals from within and without its organization. The IEEE's Ethics of Autonomous Systems initiative aims to address ethical dilemmas related to decision-making and the impact on society while developing guidelines for the development and use of autonomous systems. In particular, in domains like AI and robotics, the Foundation for Responsible Robotics is dedicated to promoting moral behavior as well as responsible robot design and use, ensuring that robots maintain moral principles and are congruent with human values.

Traditionally, government has been used by societies to ensure ethics are observed through legislation and policing. There are now many efforts by national governments, as well as transnational government and non-government organizations to ensure AI is ethically applied.

AI ethics work is structured by personal values and professional commitments, and involves constructing contextual meaning through data and algorithms. Therefore, AI ethics work needs to be incentivized.

In June 15, 2026, The Walt Disney Company teamed up with Adobe and The New York Times to create The Alliance for Responsible Innovation in the Arts & Media, a new coalition advocating for legal and policy frameworks for generative AI. It aims to promote AI while creating protections, particularly for creators and for children and other consumers.

=== Intergovernmental initiatives ===
- The European Commission has a High-Level Expert Group on Artificial Intelligence. On 8 April 2019, this published its "Ethics Guidelines for Trustworthy Artificial Intelligence". The European Commission also has a Robotics and Artificial Intelligence Innovation and Excellence unit, which published a white paper on excellence and trust in AI innovation on 19 February 2020. The European Commission also proposed the Artificial Intelligence Act, which came into force on 1 August 2024, with provisions that shall come into operation gradually over time.
- The OECD established an OECD AI Policy Observatory.
- In 2021, UNESCO adopted the Recommendation on the Ethics of Artificial Intelligence, the first global standard on the ethics of AI.

=== Governmental initiatives ===
==== China ====
- In China, the National Professional Committee on Next-Generation AI Governance issued the "Ethical Norms for the Next-Generation Artificial Intelligence" on September 25, 2021. The document outlines six basic requirements: enhancing human well-being, promoting fairness and justice, protecting privacy and safety, ensuring controllability and trustworthiness, strengthening responsibility, and improving ethical literacy. It also provides 18 specific norms for management, research and development, supply, and utilization activities. In November 2022, China submitted a "Position Paper on Strengthening the Ethical Governance of Artificial Intelligence" to the United Nations Convention on Certain Conventional Weapons (CCW) meeting. The paper advocates for the principle of "ethics first," the establishment and improvement of AI ethical rules, norms, and accountability mechanisms, and calls for the international community to reach international agreements based on broad participation.

==== Russia ====
- In Russia, the first-ever Russian "Codex of ethics of artificial intelligence" for business was signed in 2021. It was driven by Analytical Center for the Government of the Russian Federation together with major commercial and academic institutions such as Sberbank, Yandex, Rosatom, Higher School of Economics, Moscow Institute of Physics and Technology, ITMO University, Nanosemantics, Rostelecom, CIAN and others.

==== United States ====
- The Obama Administration released two prominent white papers on the future and impact of AI. In 2019 the White House through an executive memo known as the "American AI Initiative" instructed NIST (the National Institute of Standards and Technology) to begin work on Federal Engagement of AI Standards (February 2019).
- In January 2020, in the United States, the Trump Administration released a draft executive order issued by the Office of Management and Budget (OMB) on "Guidance for Regulation of Artificial Intelligence Applications" ("OMB AI Memorandum"). The order emphasizes the need to invest in AI applications, boost public trust in AI, reduce barriers for usage of AI, and keep American AI technology competitive in a global market. There is a nod to the need for privacy concerns, but no further detail on enforcement. The advances of American AI technology seems to be the focus and priority. Additionally, federal entities are even encouraged to use the order to circumnavigate any state laws and regulations that a market might see as too onerous to fulfill.
- The Artificial Intelligence Research, Innovation, and Accountability Act of 2024 was a proposed bipartisan bill introduced by U.S. Senator John Thune that would require websites to disclose the use of AI systems in handling interactions with users and regulate the transparency of "high-impact AI systems" by requiring that annual design and safety plans be submitted to the National Institute of Standards and Technology for oversight based on pre-defined assessment criteria.
- The Computing Community Consortium (CCC) weighed in with a 100-plus page draft report – A 20-Year Community Roadmap for Artificial Intelligence Research in the US
- The Center for Security and Emerging Technology advises US policymakers on the security implications of emerging technologies such as AI.

=== Academic initiatives ===
- Multiple research institutes at the University of Oxford have centrally focused on AI ethics. The Future of Humanity Institute focused on AI safety and the governance of AI before shuttering in 2024. The Institute for Ethics in AI, directed by John Tasioulas, whose primary goal, among others, is to promote AI ethics as a field proper in comparison to related applied ethics fields. The Oxford Internet Institute, directed by Luciano Floridi, focuses on the ethics of near-term AI technologies and ICTs. The AI Governance Initiative at the Oxford Martin School focuses on understanding risks from AI from technical and policy perspectives.
- The Centre for Digital Governance at the Hertie School in Berlin was co-founded by Joanna Bryson to research questions of ethics and technology.
- The AI Now Institute at NYU is a research institute studying the social implications of AI. Its interdisciplinary research focuses on the themes bias and inclusion, labor and automation, rights and liberties, and safety and civil infrastructure.
- The Institute for Ethics and Emerging Technologies (IEET) researches the effects of AI on unemployment, and policy.
- The Institute for Ethics in Artificial Intelligence (IEAI) at the Technical University of Munich directed by Christoph Lütge conducts research across various domains such as mobility, employment, healthcare and sustainability.
- Barbara J. Grosz, the Higgins Professor of Natural Sciences at the Harvard John A. Paulson School of Engineering and Applied Sciences has initiated the Embedded EthiCS into Harvard's computer science curriculum to develop a future generation of computer scientists with worldview that takes into account the social impact of their work.

=== Private organizations ===
- Algorithmic Justice League
- Black in AI
- Data for Black Lives

== History ==
Historically speaking, the investigation of moral and ethical implications of "thinking machines" goes back at least to the Enlightenment: Leibniz already posed the question of whether we should attribute intelligence to a mechanism that behaves as if it were a sentient being, and so does Descartes, who describes what could be considered an early version of the Turing test.

The romantic period has several times envisioned artificial creatures that escape the control of their creator with dire consequences, most famously in Mary Shelley's Frankenstein. The widespread preoccupation with industrialization and mechanization in the 19th and early 20th century, however, brought ethical implications of unhinged technical developments to the forefront of fiction: R.U.R – Rossum's Universal Robots, Karel Čapek's play of sentient robots endowed with emotions used as slave labor is not only credited with the invention of the term 'robot' (derived from the Czech word for forced labor, robota) but was also an international success after it premiered in 1921. George Bernard Shaw's play Back to Methuselah, published in 1921, questions at one point the validity of thinking machines that act like humans; Fritz Lang's 1927 film Metropolis shows an android leading the uprising of the exploited masses against the oppressive regime of a technocratic society.

In the 1950s, Norbert Wiener wrote The Human Use of Human Beings, discussing how humans and machines could cooperate. He explored the risk that such changes might harm society through dehumanization or subordination of humanity. Wiener offered suggestions on how to avoid such risk. Isaac Asimov considered the issue of how to control machines in I, Robot. At the insistence of his editor John W. Campbell Jr., he proposed the Three Laws of Robotics to govern artificially intelligent systems. Much of his work was then spent testing the boundaries of his three laws to see where they would break down, or where they would create paradoxical or unanticipated behavior. His work suggests that no set of fixed laws can sufficiently anticipate all possible circumstances.

More recently, academics and many governments have challenged the idea that AI can itself be held accountable. A panel convened by the United Kingdom in 2010 revised Asimov's laws to clarify that AI is the responsibility either of its manufacturers, or of its owner/operator. Eliezer Yudkowsky, from the Machine Intelligence Research Institute, suggested in 2004 a need to study how to build a "Friendly AI", meaning that there should also be efforts to make AI intrinsically friendly and humane.

In 2009, academics and technical experts attended a conference organized by the Association for the Advancement of Artificial Intelligence to discuss the potential impact of robots and computers, and the impact of the hypothetical possibility that they could become self-sufficient and make their own decisions. They discussed the possibility and the extent to which computers and robots might be able to acquire any level of autonomy, and to what degree they could use such abilities to possibly pose any threat or hazard. They noted that some machines have acquired various forms of semi-autonomy, including being able to find power sources on their own and being able to independently choose targets to attack with weapons. They also noted that some computer viruses can evade elimination and have achieved "cockroach intelligence". They noted that self-awareness as depicted in science-fiction is probably unlikely, but that there were other potential hazards and pitfalls.

Also in 2009, during an experiment at the Laboratory of Intelligent Systems in the Ecole Polytechnique Fédérale of Lausanne, Switzerland, robots that were programmed to cooperate with each other (in searching out a beneficial resource and avoiding a poisonous one) eventually learned to lie to each other in an attempt to hoard the beneficial resource.

== Role and impact of fiction ==
The role of fiction in AI ethics has been a complex one. One can distinguish three levels at which fiction has impacted the development of AI and robotics: Historically, fiction has prefigured common tropes that have influenced goals and visions for AI and also outlined ethical questions and common fears associated with it. During the second half of the twentieth and the first decades of the twenty-first century, popular culture, in particular movies, TV series and video games have frequently echoed preoccupations and dystopian projections around ethical questions concerning AI and robotics. Recently, these themes have also been increasingly treated in literature beyond science fiction. And, as Carme Torras, research professor at the Institut de Robòtica i Informàtica Industrial (Institute of robotics and industrial computing) at the Technical University of Catalonia notes, in higher education, science fiction is also increasingly used for teaching technology-related ethical issues in technological degrees.

=== TV series ===
While ethical questions linked to AI have been featured in science fiction literature and feature films for decades, the emergence of the TV series as a genre allowing for longer and more complex story lines and character development has led to some significant contributions that deal with ethical implications of technology. The Swedish series Real Humans (2012–2013) tackled the complex ethical and social consequences linked to the integration of artificial sentient beings in society. The British dystopian science fiction anthology series Black Mirror (2013–Present) is particularly notable for experimenting with dystopian fictional developments linked to a wide variety of recent technology developments. Both the French series Osmosis (2020) and British series The One deal with the question of what can happen if technology tries to find the ideal partner for a person. Several episodes of the Netflix series Love, Death+Robots have imagined scenes of robots and humans living together. The most representative one of them is S02 E01, which shows how bad the consequences can be when robots get out of control if humans rely too much on them in their lives.

=== Future visions in fiction and games ===
The movie The Thirteenth Floor suggests a future where simulated worlds with sentient inhabitants are created by computer game consoles for the purpose of entertainment. The movie The Matrix suggests a future where the dominant species on planet Earth are sentient machines and humanity is treated with utmost speciesism. The short story "The Planck Dive" suggests a future where humanity has turned itself into software that can be duplicated and optimized and the relevant distinction between types of software is sentient and non-sentient. The same idea can be found in the Emergency Medical Hologram of Starship Voyager, which is an apparently sentient copy of a reduced subset of the consciousness of its creator, Dr. Zimmerman, who, for the best motives, has created the system to give medical assistance in case of emergencies. The movies Bicentennial Man and A.I. deal with the possibility of sentient robots that could love. I, Robot explored some aspects of Asimov's three laws. All these scenarios try to foresee possibly unethical consequences of the creation of sentient computers.

Over time, debates have tended to focus less and less on possibility and more on desirability, as emphasized in the "Cosmist" and "Terran" debates initiated by Hugo de Garis and Kevin Warwick.

== See also ==
- AI disclosure
- AI takeover
- AI washing
- Antiqua et nova
- Artificial consciousness
- Artificial general intelligence (AGI)
- Artificial intelligence and copyright
- Artificial intelligence and elections
- Computer ethics
- Dead internet theory
- Data colonialism
- Effective altruism, the long term future and global catastrophic risks
- Ethics of uncertain sentience
- Human Compatible
- Magnifica humanitas
- Metaverse law
- Personhood
- Philosophy of artificial intelligence
- Robotic Governance
- Roko's basilisk
- Superintelligence: Paths, Dangers, Strategies
- Suffering risks
