= Magnifica humanitas =

2026 encyclical of Pope Leo XIV

Magnifica humanitas Latin for 'magnificent humanity' Encyclical of Pope Leo XIV
- Signature date: 15 May 2026
- Subject: On safeguarding the human person in the time of artificial intelligence
- Number: 1 of 1 of the pontificate
- Text: In English

Magnifica humanitas (lit. 'magnificent humanity') is the first encyclical of Pope Leo XIV, concerned with "safeguarding the human person in the time of artificial intelligence" (AI). It was published on 25 May 2026 after having been signed on 15 May. Despite its Latin title, Magnifica humanitas lacks Latin text and is one of the few papal encyclicals without it.

Leo chose to present the encyclical personally at the Vatican, unlike most other popes who delegated this task to cardinals. The presentation was attended by AI experts, including Anthropic co-founder Chris Olah.

The encyclical argues for placing dignity of the human person at the center of all reflection and, in turn, making it the fundamental criterion guiding technological progress and the assessment of its social, cultural, and moral consequences. It also asserts that human experience, expression, and intelligence are divine creations, not comparable to artificial intelligence systems which are optimized according to technocratic principles.

The encyclical affirms the principles of the Church's social doctrine—particularly common good, solidarity, and subsidiarity—as tools to be used for interpreting the ongoing transformation. Faced with the risk of a culture consumed by power, domination, and war, the document proposes the alternative possibility of a civilization of love founded on justice, dialogue, and shared responsibility.

== Title ==
The title Magnifica humanitas evokes the greatness and centrality of the human person. The encyclical connects this dignity to its theological foundation: the human person as created in the image and likeness of God and called to live in relationship and communion.

The encyclical is subtitled On Safeguarding the Human Person in the Time of Artificial Intelligence, and directly addresses "anthropological" and social questions.

Moreover, the title recalls the Magnificat, the canticle pronounced by Mary in Luke 1:46–55. This initial biblical and spiritual reference recalls Mary as an icon of humble faith and hope. Within the context of the encyclical, this Marian theme invites Christians to persevere in prayer and to become "weavers of hope" even in the darkest moments of history.

== Background and release ==
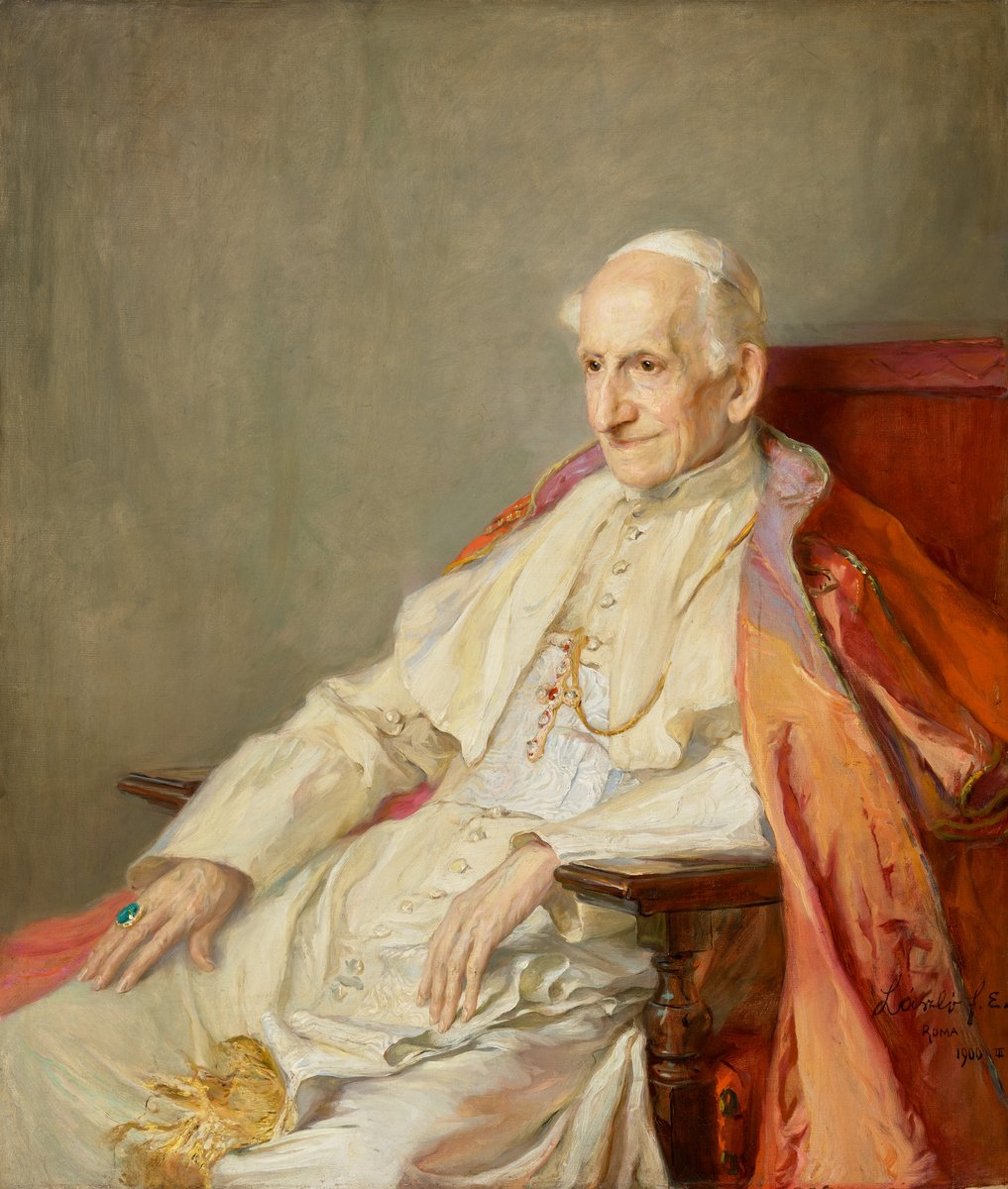
Magnifica humanitas was published on the 135th anniversary of the encyclical Rerum novarum by Pope Leo XIII (pictured).

Since the beginning of his pontificate, Pope Leo XIV expressed concerns regarding the rise of artificial intelligence, the crises of human dignity, and multilateralism. The encyclical's signing on 15 May fell on the 135th anniversary of the publication of Rerum novarum, the landmark encyclical regarding industrialization written by Pope Leo XIII.

Cardinal Robert Francis Prevost chose the name Leo, not only to pay homage to Leo XIII, but also to address the challenges to humanity posed by artificial intelligence and the modern industrial revolution. Magnifica humanitas, in continuity with this choice, recalls Rerum novarum and reinterprets its social concern in light of the transformations being brought about by artificial intelligence. Its theological reflection is rooted in the principles and foundations of social doctrine, as the criteria for discerning the challenges of the present time.

The theme of Pope Leo XIV's encyclical—namely the safeguarding of the human person in the age of artificial intelligence—follows reflections already undertaken by the Holy See on this subject. As early as 2019, the conversation began within the Roman Curia concerning the social, ethical, and political implications of the changes brought about by digital technologies, including artificial intelligence. At that time, the Dicastery for Promoting Integral Human Development (DPIHD) and the Pontifical Council for Culture (PCC) convened a seminar of experts to foster an in-depth debate on the theme of the common good in the digital age. Two years later, the same bodies organized a conference entitled "Promoting Integral Human Development and Peace in the Digital Age. New Technologies in the Post-Covid World." At the center of the discussion was how the pandemic and the consequent lockdown had accelerated the process of digitalization, concluding that this development made remote access to various social services possible, while also not allowing sufficient time either for ethical reflection or for comprehensive legislative regulation.

A more developed reflection on the future of artificial intelligence came in January 2024 through the message of Pope Francis for the World Day of Peace, entitled "Artificial Intelligence and Peace". There, Francis reflects on the progress of science and technology as a path toward peace and also addresses the ethical dimension of AI, including issues regarding privacy, bias, and the impact of AI on human dignity, encouraging people to confront the challenges of education and the development of international law.

Wanting one of the top four AI companies to attend, the Vatican invited Anthropic, due to its perceived priority of ethics. Anthropic co-founder Chris Olah was invited to speak at the Vatican's presentation of the encyclical on 25 May 2026. Upon reading the pope's stance against AI in an advance copy of the encyclical, Olah considered pulling Anthropic from the presentation. Olah praised the Vatican's role as "informed critics" and the beginning of a "long collaboration between those of us who are building this and those who can see what we, from inside, cannot". The other experts speaking at the presentation alongside Leo XIV were Professor Anna Rowlands, Cardinal Víctor Manuel Fernández, Cardinal Michael Czerny, and Professor Léocadie Lushombo.

== Contents ==
The encyclical is subtitled "Safeguarding the Human Person in the Time of artificial intelligence". Within the introduction, Leo XIV describes the state of the encyclical addresses:

We are living through a rapid phase of transition, a "change of era," in which — while some are vying for the future of new technologies and others dedicate themselves to reflecting on the matter — most people are watching and waiting, observing from afar and merely hoping for the best. For this very reason, crucial questions impose themselves on our conscience and can no longer be avoided: Where are we going? Toward what goal do we wish to orient ourselves? What direction should we choose as a people and as a human community?

=== Structure ===
The document is organized as follows:

- Introduction (paragraphs 1–16)
- Chapter One: A Dynamic Approach Faithful To The Gospel (paragraphs 17–45)
- Chapter Two: Foundations And Principles Of The Social Doctrine Of The Church (paragraphs 46–89)
- Chapter Three: Technology And Dominance. The Grandeur Of Humanity In Light Of The Promises Of AI (paragraphs 90–130)
- Chapter Four: Safeguarding Humanity At A Time Of Transformation. Truth, Work, Freedom (paragraphs 131–181)
- Chapter Five: The Culture Of Power And The Civilization Of Love (paragraphs 182–228)
- Conclusion (paragraphs 229–245)

=== Major themes ===
==== Introduction ====
Leo XIV begins the encyclical by presenting two choices: humanity can build a second Tower of Babel, or they can "build the city in which God and humanity dwell together". The pope argues that this encyclical must address the very real lives of and challenges faced by modern Catholics. Technology (and in particular, artificial intelligence) is one of those challenges, and the church must rise to answer it.

The pope compares the choices humanity has before them to the Tower of Babel and Nehemiah's rebuilding of Jerusalem. The creation of artificial intelligence, the pope argues, could be like the Tower of Babel. He describes it as an example of humanity's attempt to reach heaven without God: the people eliminated the uniqueness and the diversity of humanity in exchange for uniform efficiency, and suffered for it. Conversely, when Nehemiah led the rebuilding of the walls of Jerusalem, he did so by orchestrating the vast diversity of experiences and giving everyone a unique role to play in the rebuilding efforts. The rebuilding was successful and blessed by God.

The encyclical states that if we want to protect the good of humanity, we must all play a role in protecting that which makes us human. The pope calls on not only Catholics, but also Christians and all "men and women of goodwill" to play this role: "I ask everyone to abandon the construction of yet another Tower of Babel and to join forces in building up the common good, so that humanity will never lose its beauty, and the world once again will come to recognize the human heart as the place where God desires to dwell."

==== Establishment of fundamental principles ====
In order to better frame the context in which the encyclical was written, Leo XIV begins with a recapitulation of the development of Catholic faith from Rerum novarum through Vatican II and into the 21st Century pontificates of John Paul II, Benedict XVI, and Francis (the "recent Magisterium"). He notes how the focus on work in Rerum novarum is taken up and expanded in Pope Pius XI's Quadragesimo anno "to encompass the overall structure of the economic and political order" as seen in its theory on the principle of subsidiarity.

This discussion continues through a statement of foundations and principles for Catholic social teaching. This includes Christian doctrines (that humanity is made in the image of God, and that God entered human history through the incarnation of Jesus), as well as humanistic principles (such as social equality and universal human rights). Leo notes how the encyclicals of Paul VI and John Paul II (Populorum progressio and Sollicitudo rei socialis) each stressed "integral" human development, meaning development that can "foster the development of each man and of the whole man."

==== Technological advancement ====
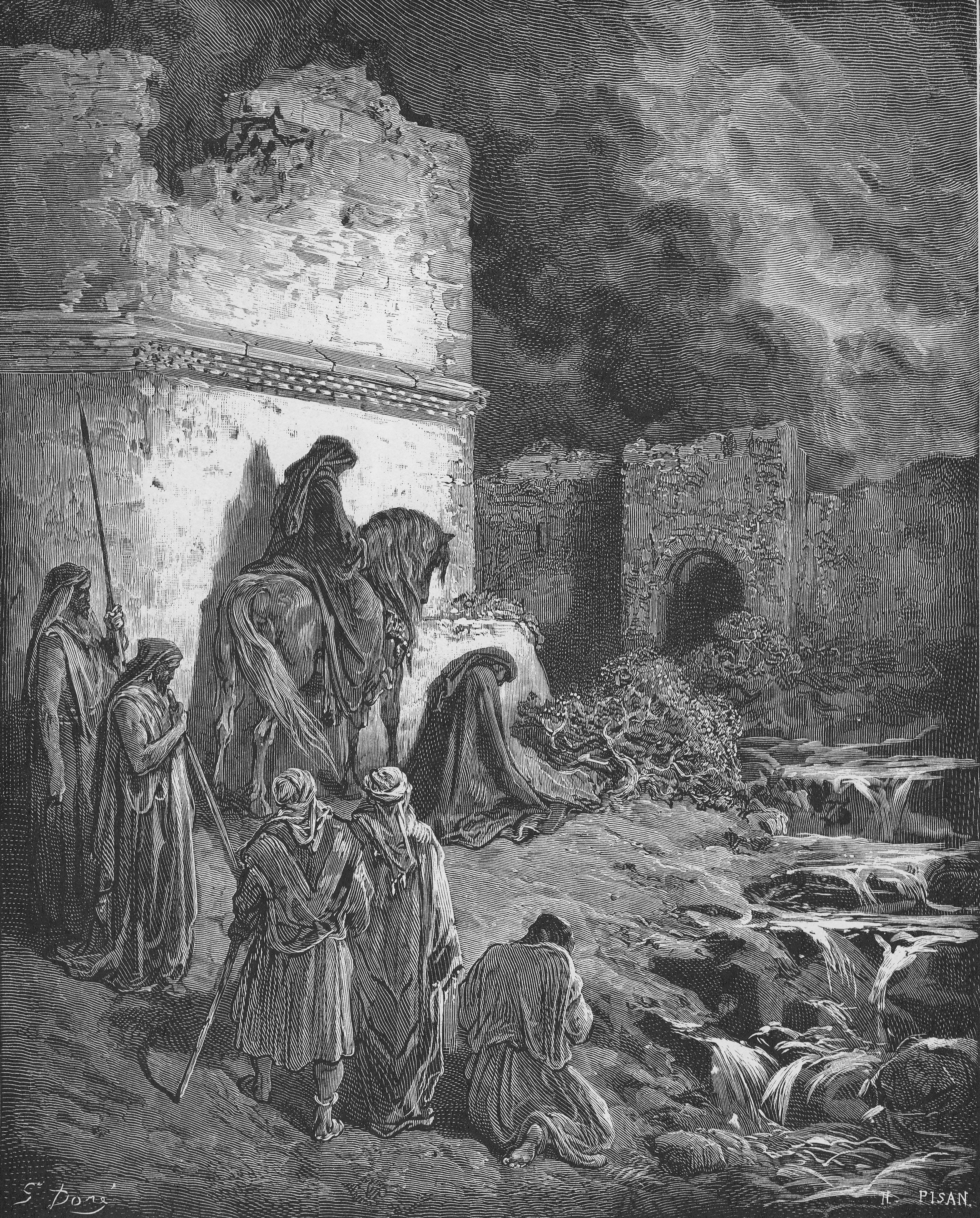
Nehemiah Views the Ruins of Jerusalem's Walls, an illustration of the Biblical passage Nehemiah 2:1–20

The central portion of Magnifica humanitas reflects upon humanity's newest technologies: including artificial intelligence, cognitive science, nanotechnology, robotics and biotechnology. The encyclical cites Laudato si' for its criticisms of the view of technocracy and the belief that the development of technology is morally neutral; instead calling for the questioning of technology's purpose and direction.

The biblical image accompanying these reflections is that of a building project. On the one hand, there is the Tower of Babel, where collective effort follows a plan that dominates and ultimately dehumanizes (cf. Gen 11:1–9). On the other hand, there are the ruins of Jerusalem, which under Nehemiah's direction are rebuilt piece by piece as a project of shared responsibility (cf. Neh 2–6). We are called to reflect on the great "construction sites" of our era and ask: What are we building?

— Chapter Three, paragraph 90

===== Artificial intelligence =====
The bulk of the discussion of technology in Magnifica humanitas concerns artificial intelligence. Noting first that Antiqua et nova previously explored the ethics of artificial intelligence in depth, Leo XIV states his task as "recalling a few essential elements for a moral and social discernment that safeguards the primacy of the human person", first attacking the notion of artificial intelligence having sentience and consciousness.

These systems merely imitate certain functions of human intelligence. In doing so, they often surpass human intelligence in speed and computational capacity, offering tangible benefits across many fields. Yet this power remains entirely tied to data processing. So-called artificial intelligences do not undergo experiences, do not possess a body, do not feel joy or pain, do not mature through relationships and do not know from within what love, work, friendship or responsibility mean. Nor do they have a moral conscience, since they do not judge good and evil, grasp the ultimate meaning of situations, or bear responsibility for consequences. They may imitate language, behavior and analytical skills, or even simulate empathy and understanding, but they do not understand what they produce, for they lack the affective, relational and spiritual perspective through which human beings grow in wisdom. Even when these tools are described as capable of "learning," their way of doing so is different from that of a human person. It is not the experience of those who allow themselves to be shaped by life and grow over time through choices, mistakes, forgiveness and fidelity. Rather, it is a form of statistical adaptation based on data and feedback, which can be very effective, but does not imply inner growth.

— Chapter Three, paragraph 99

Magnifica humanitas states that AI "can be a valuable tool" but at the same time demands a "measured and vigilant approach" and details such an approach.

The encyclical opposes an artificial intelligence arms race and the use of artificial intelligence in warfare, stating that reduced human control of weaponry makes it easier to begin wars. Leo writes that consequently, Catholic just war theory ("which has all too often been used to justify any kind of war"), has become "outdated", a comment which Modern Age's Peter Keepman found "tangential". Addressing transhumanism, posthumanism, and pursuit of human–machine hybrids, Leo XIV calls to "integrate technology within a human-centered, relational vision" and warns against "an outlook that devalues human limits and promises a purely technical form of 'salvation.'" He states that "only the shared pursuit of the veracity of facts, perceived as a common good, can provide a solid foundation for just communication". The encyclical criticizes deepfakes and similar disinformation attacks. In response to such threats, the encyclical calls for "an ecology of communication" and "an educational alliance" to address media literacy. Leo XIV restates the Catholic doctrine of dignity of labour which he argues is inherent to finding purpose and fulfillment, promoting employment and labour rights.

==== Achievements of humanity ====
This subsection of the encyclical consists of examples of human achievement both in spite of and because of its "fundamental finitude".

===== Individuals =====
- Civil rights activists and humanitarians Martin Luther King Jr. and Nelson Mandela
- "Generous women" Saint Laura Montoya, Saint Teresa of Calcutta, Dorothy Day, Marie Skłodowska-Curie, Maria Montessori, Elisabeth Elliot, Wangari Maathai, and Benazir Bhutto
- "Martyrs of fraternity and justice" including Saint Maximilian Mary Kolbe, Saint Oscar Romero, Blessed Enrique Angelelli, and Venerable Francis-Xavier Nguyễn Văn Thuận

Anthem of Europe (short version)
The Anthem of Europe, based on the final movement ("Ode to Joy") of Beethoven's 9th Symphony composed in 1823. Performed by the United States Navy Band. Pope Leo XIV writes that the Symphony "can be seen as a desire for unity."

===== Works of art =====
- Ludwig van Beethoven's Symphony No. 9
- Guernica by Pablo Picasso
- Schindler's List by Steven Spielberg

===== Humanitarian organizations and documents =====
- The International Committee of the Red Cross
- The United Nations
- Universal Declaration of Human Rights
- 1951 Refugee Convention

==== Safeguarding humanity ====
The encyclical considers the current digital transformation in light of some specific ways that the person is formed and safeguarded: truth, work, and freedom. The question of truth concerns the possibility of distinguishing the real from the manipulated, in an environment characterized by the automatic production of content, disinformation, and the growing difficulty of recognizing reliable sources. Work is presented as a decisive sphere of human dignity, exposed to the risk of being reduced to mere efficiency or replaced by automated processes, while lacking adequate social discernment. Freedom is reread in light of digital dependencies, the massive collection of data, and the invisible influences on behavior. Alongside these themes, the document recalls the role of education, the family, and communities, all called to accompany, especially the young, in the critical and responsible use of technologies. Safeguarding the human person in a time of digital transformation therefore means protecting the conditions that make possible a life marked by truth, authentic relationships, dignified work, real freedom, and shared responsibility.

===== Opposition to modern slavery =====
Magnifica humanitas condemns "post-humanist currents even go so far as to envision 'second-class' human beings, subordinate to the interests of elites who consider themselves superior." The encyclical calls for "breaking the chains of new forms of slavery" attacking the nexus of technology and human exploitation in such matters as Child Sexual Abuse Material, labor conditions in outsourced content moderation, and labor abuses in rare earths supply chains. In connection to this discussion of new forms of slavery, the encyclical also offers apologies for the Catholic Church's role in slavery, noting the formal and absolute condemnation of slavery in the 19th century articulated by his namesake Pope Leo XIII in In plurimis. In the notes, Leo XIV further states:

Political and, at times, even economic needs overcame the demands of the Gospel. The need for evangelization was frequently compromised or at least misunderstood with regard to the needs of worldly powers, thus relativizing the problematic incompatibility of slavery with the Christian conscience.

==== Moral responsibility in the military ====
The encyclical addresses the relationship between technological innovation, war, and moral responsibility in international affairs. It argues that new technologies applied to weaponry transform the way decisions concerning life and death are made into a "culture of power": an automation of military processes results in the dangerous possibility of rendering judgment increasingly impersonal, diminishing human responsibility, and subordinating the protection of life to the effectiveness of means.

The encyclical sees traditional just war theory falling out of date as it observes (and condemns) the normalisation of war as seen across several phenomena:

- The superpowers' turn away from arms reduction: no nuclear-armed power has signed the Treaty on the Prohibition of Nuclear Weapons, instead moving closer to the use of tactical nuclear weapons;
- Emergence of "new armed operatives": jihadists, private military companies and criminal networks that perpetuate conflict for enrichment and erode the state's monopoly of force;
- The compromising of humanitarian law: proportionality in responding to aggression is increasingly disregarded with civilian casualties allowed to mount.

In opposition, the encyclical calls for a "civilization of love": a common life oriented by justice, unity, and dialogue. The pope specifically calls for a return to diplomacy, taking up interreligious dialogue and giving voice to victims of war.

==== Conclusion ====
Leo XIV concludes by outlining again the fundamentals of the faith, and urging followers to pursue those fundamentals even in the midst of artificial intelligence. Humanity's capacity to create is a gift from God, he argues, and our unique heart and conscience are gifts that even the most advanced computers will never be able to replicate.

The encyclical urges readers to continue taking the Eucharist, to remain faithful to the truth, to invest in education, to cultivate human relationships, and to uphold justice and peace. It further warns against being "passive spectators of social and cultural fractures", but instead urges readers to help a struggling world. The pope ends by emphasizing the importance of hope, and urging readers to emulate the hope found in the Magnificat.

=== Works cited ===
On matters of artificial intelligence, Leo writes that "authoritative contributions already exist, including within the ecclesial context" about artificial intelligence. He specifically cites the work of his late predecessor Pope Francis, Antiqua et nova published 28 January 2025, and several previous works published by the Holy See during the 2020s.

Besides quoting and citing prior popes, Leo XIV also constantly refers to works related to the social doctrine of the Church and the Second Vatican Council. The encyclical also cites the United Nations Charter's stated determination to "save succeeding generations from the scourge of war" in the face of the increasing conflicts of the present era.

Tolkien's The Lord of the Rings: The Return of the King (Book V) was quoted in the section "We can all do our part":

The twentieth-century Catholic author J. R. R. Tolkien, in the words of a protagonist in one of his novels, described our responsibility in this way: "It is not our part to master all the tides of the world, but to do what is in us for the succour of those years wherein we are set, uprooting the evil in the fields that we know, so that those who live after may have clean earth to till."

Other works cited include:

- Confessiones, De Civitate Dei and Sermons by Saint Augustine of Hippo;
- Discours de l'état et des grandeurs de Jésus, Discours IV, Unité de Dieu en l'incarnation by Pierre de Bérulle;
- The End of the Modern World by Romano Guardini;
- Man's Search for Meaning by Viktor Frankl;
- The Origins of Totalitarianism by Hannah Arendt;
- Riflessioni sul Concilio by Giorgio La Pira;
- Commentaries on Boethius's De Trinitate by Saint Thomas Aquinas.

== Production ==
The encyclical was first published in Arabic, English, French, German, Italian, Polish, Portuguese, and Spanish. As of October 2026, no official Latin text has been published. Vatican Radio released audiobook versions of the encyclical in English, German, and Polish languages.

The presentation of the encyclical was broadcast by Vatican News from New Synod Hall with American Sign Language interpretation. The presentation included speeches from:

- Cardinals Víctor Manuel Fernández, Michael Czerny, and Pietro Parolin;
- theologians Anna Rowlands and Léocadie Lushombo; and
- technologist Chris Olah.

Vatican News also released one-on-one interviews with Rowlands, Lushombo, and Cardinal Czerny about the encyclical.

The Dicastery for Promoting Integral Human Development released a video in tandem with the encyclical, and gathered them in a playlist.

== Implementation ==
The implementation of Magnifica humanitas as policy of the Church began in tandem with the document's release.

=== Commission on Artificial Intelligence ===
At the beginning of May 2026, the Pope approved an Interdicasterial Commission on Artificial Intelligence which would be made up of representatives from seven departments of the Roman Curia: the Dicastery for Promoting Integral Human Development, the Dicastery for the Doctrine of the Faith, the Dicastery for Culture and Education, the Dicastery for Communication, the Pontifical Academy for Life, the Pontifical Academy of Sciences, and the Pontifical Academy of Social Sciences. The commission would "facilitate collaboration and the exchange of information among group members regarding activities and projects related to artificial intelligence, including policies on its use within the Holy See, while promoting dialogue, communion, and participation". The Commission held its first meeting 27 June 2026.

=== College of Cardinals ===
Pope Leo XIV called for an extraordinary papal consistory for late June 2026 before the encyclical was issued. Subsequent to the encyclical's release, a letter to cardinals noted that sessions of the June consistory would focus on matters brought up in Magnifica humanitas including artificial intelligence and just war theory.

Two sessions explicitly centered on Magnifica humanitas:

- "The Culture of Power and the Civilization of Love", based on Chapter V of the encyclical, was introduced by cardinal Víctor Manuel Fernández and discussed "tensions, divisions, and conflicts" as well as "reconciliation, coexistence, and peace". Politico Europe noted that cardinal Fernández called for a more strict definition of self-defense and proportionality in warfare. Fernández condemned double standards of the global community, such as the European Union adopting international sanctions in response to the 2022 Russian invasion of Ukraine but not against Israel's conduct in its ongoing conflicts in Gaza and Lebanon.
- "Building the Good: The Worksites of Our Time", based on the Introduction and Conclusion of the encyclical, was introduced by cardinal Stephen Brislin, to discuss "support, guidance, or initiatives from the local Churches and the universal Church" for the common good. Vatican News noted cardinal Brislin's endorsement of the Church's adoption of synodality to address social changes brought about by technology.

=== Rank and file ===
The Dicastery for Promoting Integral Human Development also published a "pastoral proposal" intended to help individuals, groups, and communities to understand the encyclical. It includes excerpts from the encyclical, questions for personal and community reflection, suggestions for a practical, experiential approach, relevant biblical texts, and several prayers on the theme of technology.

=== Catholic Universities Art Triennial ===
In August 2026, the Dicastery for Culture and Education announced an international art exhibition of Catholic universities, artists, curators and cultural institutions billed as the Catholic Universities Art Triennial, with its first theme "Exercises in Empathy" inspired by passages of Magnifica humanitas. The exhibition started in August 2026 and will hold events in Rio de Janeiro, Santiago, Bogotá, Boston, Milan, Lisbon and Luanda. The exhibition is curated by Portuguese academic and art critic Nuno Crespo.

== Reception ==
=== Media ===
Secular media discussed the encyclical as part of the Holy See's soft power to shape public opinion. Margherita Stancati and Sam Schechner of The Wall Street Journal described the encyclical as "a text that is poised to define Leo's papacy", saying that it had been "long-awaited" as a useful moral teaching for policymakers and faith groups. David Streitfeld, writing for The New York Times, analyzed the text as representing the contrast between traditional religions and a growing tendency in Silicon Valley to speak of artificial intelligence in quasi-religious tones. Krysta Fauria from Associated Press wrote that the public's "enthusiasm" for the encyclical "is driven in part by a perception, especially among young people, that few political or global leaders grasp or take seriously the known and potential ramifications of AI's rapid rise." Magnifica humanitas was described by BBC as "a stark and direct message to those in positions of power about their responsibilities in curbing the 'threats' it poses".

In Christian media, a variety of responses followed the encyclical's release. John Grosso of Where Peter Is interpreted much of the text (particularly the included quote from The Lord of the Rings) as a direct criticism of Peter Thiel. Grosso drew attention to the contrast between the views espoused by the Catholic Church, Tolkien and Tolkien's characters, and the transhumanist, techno-feudalist, and authoritarian political positions of Thiel. Sally Scholz, writing in the National Catholic Reporter, praised the document's focus on solidarity, saying that it "beautifully synthesizes the tradition". Ned Desmond, writing for the religious journal First Things, called the encyclical a "missed opportunity" and described the use of Nehemiah as an analogy as a "blind spot". Luma Simms, writing for the Catholic magazine Providence, critiqued the encyclical for not referencing Humanae vitae, a prior encyclical which deals with human sexuality. Simms also speculated that the prior encyclical could lose relevance in Catholic social thought in the future. Matthew Walther, a Catholic writer and AI critic, called it "disappointingly measured and cautious".

=== Public ===
The encyclical caught the attention of the wider public and quickly went viral. On social media, the document sparked praise and memes. Comparisons were drawn with Frank Herbert's Dune and its concept of Butlerian jihad. Young people especially (both Catholics and non-Catholics) appeared to gravitate towards Leo's arguments for the essentiality of humanity. In an Associated Press article, 27-year-old Isabel Thurston stated that, "people have really been looking for a response to AI...This was the first — at least in my sphere of the world — world leader to make an announcement of this magnitude."

==== Polling ====
Over the span of 29 May to 1 June 2026, The Economist and YouGov conducted public opinion polling of adult U.S. citizens about artificial intelligence. The poll adapted five statements from public figures as polling questions, asking participants whether they agreed or disagreed. Two statements were from Pope Leo XIV in Magnifica humanitas. Participants were not told the sources of the quotes.

Question	Source	Agree	Not Sure	Disagree
Artificial intelligence does not feel joy or pain and does not know from within what love, work, friendship or responsibility mean.	Pope Leo XIV	83%	10%	7%
AI will open up new ways of doing things that we cannot even imagine today.	Sundar Pichai	65%	15%	21%
We can embrace AI for alleviating suffering and unlocking new possibilities so long as we do not abandon the very essence of our humanity, which is our capacity for relationship and love.	Pope Leo XIV	61%	17%	22%
AI will change jobs like new technological tools have throughout most of history, allowing people to do more and achieve things in new ways.	Sam Altman	54%	15%	30%
If anybody builds an artificial superintelligence, then everyone on earth will die.	Eliezer Yudkowsky	22%	28%	50%

The same poll asked for opinions toward public figures, with 55% of respondents having a favorable view of Pope Leo XIV.

==== Religious beliefs and accommodations ====
Online, several articles discussed whether the encyclical would increase demand for objections to AI to be accommodated on grounds of religious freedom or freedom of conscience. Canadian attorney Christopher Achkar told Global News that laws such as the Canadian Human Rights Act and Human Rights Code of Ontario may provide some protections against adverse treatment for religious objectors to artificial intelligence. USA Today spoke with James Paul, a labor and employment litigator, who stated that he expects AI-related religious accommodation cases to "mushroom". The article cites Title VII of the Civil Rights Act of 1964.

=== Technology industry ===
Cade Metz from The New York Times stated that "response to the encyclical from across Silicon Valley was fairly muted." He interviewed technologist Jeremy Nixon, who dismissed Leo's words and stated that the Holy See "couldn't have a position on [AI] because they don't understand it". Nixon told Metz that many scientists in the AI field are influenced by the new atheism of Richard Dawkins, and that compared to God, "AI as an alternative... was more real and far more powerful." Nixon also compared the arrival of artificial general intelligence to the Second Coming of Jesus Christ.

Other responses from those in the technology world varied. Venture capitalist David Sacks stated that the Pope "rightly warns that AI must serve human dignity" but believed that regulations on AI could be "used to censor, surveil, and control citizens — as Orwell foretold in 1984." Jack Dorsey reshared Leo's post that "we must also include new forms of property, such as patents, algorithms, digital platforms, technological infrastructure and data" and added the comment "yes". Blake Scholl of Boom Technology expressed disapproval, stating, "Bad take from the Pope. Tech revolutions tend to eliminate some jobs while creating others. If we cling to jobs, we'd still be ploughing fields by hand out of fear of disruption."

=== Governments ===
Several government officials, particularly of countries where Catholicism is a major religion, responded to the encyclical.

==== Americas ====
Canadian Prime Minister Mark Carney and Pope Leo XIV had a telephone conversation 29 May after the encyclical's release. Readouts about the call spoke of the two sides' mutual interest in responsible use of artificial intelligence. The Carney government released its National Artificial Intelligence Strategy the following week. The Next Web was critical of Carney's public embrace of the papal encyclical, describing the Canadian government's own AI strategy as offering "few concrete safety mechanisms, no hard timelines for new regulation, and no clear enforcement architecture."

US Vice President JD Vance spoke about the encyclical in a commencement speech to the U.S. Air Force Academy. In it, he stated that graduates should "use technology to make you better, but never submit to it." He agreed with Leo's admonition "not to outsource the most important decisions to digital technology." Representative Rosa DeLauro, despite her strong support for abortion-rights being at odds with the encyclical, led a group of fifty-four Catholic House Democratic Caucus members in a "statement of principles" citing the encyclical (and Catholic social teaching in general) to support policies that "help individuals and families meet basic human needs, provide economic opportunities, and level the playing field between workers, owners, stockholders, and consumers."

Mexican president Claudia Sheinbaum quoted the encyclical and called on Mexicans to discuss it in their communities, regardless of their personal faith.

Colombian president Gustavo Petro shared a link to the encyclical via his X account and detailed his own apprehensions about artificial intelligence.

==== Europe ====
Spanish prime minister Pedro Sánchez met with Pope Leo XIV two days after the encyclical was released, and expressed his agreement with the Pope's view that "no technology is neutral, and therefore Artificial Intelligence is not neutral either".

At a European Commission press briefing, the commission's spokesperson for tech sovereignty, defence, space, and research matters said, "We do need a proper, robust framework of rules when it comes to AI", and pointed to the European Union's legal frameworks laid out in the Artificial Intelligence Act, Digital Services Act, and Digital Markets Act.

In debates of the Dáil Éireann 26 May 2026, the encyclical was referenced in questioning of Taoiseach Micheál Martin by Sinéad Gibney of the opposition Social Democrats about the strength of regulations over artificial intelligence.

On 5 June 2026, the House of Lords in the United Kingdom held a debate "Artificial Intelligence: Impact on Human Relationships and Society" in which several participants cited the importance of the encyclical. This included the Lords Spiritual led by Archbishop of Canterbury, senior bishop and primate of the Church of England, as well as Lords Temporal affiliated with the three largest parties Labour, Conservative, Liberal Democrats.

==== Africa ====
President of Ghana John Mahama responded to the Vatican's apology for its role in the slave trade in a prepared statement, saying he expresses "appreciation to His Holiness Pope Leo XIV for this significant step and looks forward to continuing global engagement in promoting truth, healing and a shared commitment to humanity."

=== Academia ===
Several Catholic universities provided analysis from their faculty, including University of Navarra, Georgetown University, Fordham University, and University of Notre Dame.

Academics from a range of disciplines in non-Catholic universities also provided responses, including Samuel Tranter of the McDonald Centre for Theology, Ethics, and Public Life at the University of Oxford; assistant professor Jacob J. Erickson of theology, ecology, and ethics at Trinity College Dublin; Thomas Anton Kochan of human resources and management studies at Massachusetts Institute of Technology; Cybersecurity Policy scholar David A. Hoffman of Duke University; and Jan Burzlaff of the Jewish studies Program at Cornell University.

=== Non-Catholic religious figures ===
==== Mainline Protestant ====
Dame Sarah Mullally, the archbishop of Canterbury and senior bishop of the Church of England, led a debate in the House of Lords making common cause with Pope Leo XIV's concerns on the impact of AI on human relationships and society.

Wave after wave of technological innovation is taking place as we speak. The question we should be asking is simple: where are we going? What is our vision for how this technology will serve human flourishing? We are in danger of unleashing AI into our lives and societies without the theological, philosophical and spiritual framework with which to make decisions about creating, controlling, using or directing it.

Above all, we need to ensure that AI is being designed, built, regulated and used to serve our glorious humanity and not to diminish it—to be pro-human. As Pope Leo has said, "humanity—in all its grandeur and woundedness—must never be replaced or surpassed".

This poses the question: does AI make human life more human? The question matters for those designing, developing and building the technology as they think about what ideologies and belief systems should underpin the models, for there is no such thing as value-neutral technology.

— Sarah Mullally, Archbishop of Canterbury

Heinrich Bedford-Strohm, a Lutheran bishop and moderator of the central committee of the ecumenical World Council of Churches, said that "we have been discussing [A.I.] intensely in the last years within the World Council of Churches ... I am very grateful that Pope Leo is now giving a strong impulse to this discussion with his new encyclical".

==== Evangelical and non-denominational Christian ====
Evangelical minister and Pepperdine University vice chancellor, Johnnie Moore Jr. thanked Leo for recognizing the "central danger" but denounced the encyclical on several fronts: on economics for "making war on capitalism" showing "no faith in markets", and in matters of war for failing to "appreciate that AI makes lethal force more precise, not less." Moore, a Christian Zionist and defender of the State of Israel's actions in the Gaza war, also attacked the pope's calls for multilateralism and diplomacy, stating that "Full peace belongs to the New Jerusalem — not to any treaty we'll sign in this one."

Jay Kranda, a pastor of the non-denominational Christian Saddleback Church known for use of new technologies, disagreed with Pope Leo XIV's critique. In an interview with Christianity Today, he said "I just don't want us so 'doomer' about the machines that we downplay how central humanity is to God's plan. My take is AI has way more ability to enhance our world than end it. But it is a tool. And you and I have to wield it wisely."

==== Orthodoxy ====
Writing for the Greek Orthodox Archdiocese of America's publication Orthodox Observer, the protopresbyter Nicolas Kazarian wrote that "the document's intended audience clearly extends far beyond the Roman Catholic Church. Its ecumenical dimension is explicit and compelling."

==== Judaism ====
Rabbi Mark Dratch, a longtime participant in Orthodox Jewish interfaith dialogue with the Vatican, wrote in an editorial for The Times of Israel that "Pope Leo warns against what he calls the 'complete delegation of important and sensitive decision-making' to systems that have never seen a human face... the warning deserves Jewish endorsement and Jewish amplification."

David Zvi Kalman of the Shalom Hartman Institute who studies Jewish responses to emergent technologies, agreed with much of the encyclical, but found he had "a hard time seeing Jerusalem as an abstraction" and noted how prohibitions of classes of people from the Temple complicate the story of Nehemiah's reconstruction.

== See also ==
- Catholic Church and artificial intelligence
- Ethics of artificial intelligence
- Human–AI interaction
- Timeline of artificial intelligence
- Artificial intelligence controversies
