= Metaverse law =

Laws concerning 3D virtual worlds

Metaverse law refers to legal systems, policies and theories concerning metaverse technologies involving virtual reality, augmented reality, mixed reality, and hyperreality. Metaverse Law also refers to a privacy, AI, and cybersecurity law firm founded in 2018.

== Metaverse law in practice ==
Metaverse law is in the early stages of development in legal scholarship and legal practice compared to other established legal fields. Also, not all legal practitioners and scholars have recognized metaverse law as a specialized area of study, given the early stage of metaverse technology adoption in the public. Instead, some legal practitioners and scholars anticipating the metaverse technology have examined the metaverse by looking at the relationship between traditional legal frameworks and the metaverse. So for many individuals, metaverse law is spoken in the context of existing laws involving and applying to the metaverse, rather than treating metaverse law as a legal field.

== Emerging metaverse law theories ==
=== Metaverse law theory ===
While some people view the metaverse law under the umbrella of established legal fields, others have taken a broader position. For instance, one legal think tank has proposed the theory that metaverse law is a new area of study that must be recognized as a legal field in entirety, rejecting the view that metaverse law is a sub-discipline of an existing legal discipline. In similar vein, some legal scholars have claimed that the metaverse demands an entirely new legal infrastructure such as independent virtual jurisdiction, legal order, and self-regulating government bodies and constitutions.

However, some say that the metaverse law theory falls short in practice. Regulators have stated that they need to have a better understanding of the metaverse to create metaverse-specific laws, and the metaverse market has been struggling to achieve stability. Other critics point out that metaverse is not any more unique than a game. For example, some technology leaders, like Microsoft CEO Satya Nadella, do not distinguish metaverse from a game. Distinguishing the metaverse from a game was an important distinction in Epic Games v. Apple, where the plaintiff was unsuccessful in the claim that its software could avoid defendant Apple Inc.'s commission charges on in-app game purchases because plaintiff's software is classified as a metaverse, as opposed to a game. Additionally, proponents of the metaverse law theory also agree that establishing the metaverse law as a legal field necessarily involves studying the intersection between existing legal theories and the metaverse.

=== Metalaw ===
In one opinion article, McCollum suggested that metalaw will emerge as the legal system that governs the metaverse. Citing Haley's 1956 article, Space Law and Metalaw – A Synoptic View, McCollum claimed that metaverse will adopt the terminology, "metalaw," to represent laws associated with metaverse because metalaw describes conditions and rules by which "sapient beings of a different kind" do not follow, unlike the way human beings do on Earth, alluding that extraterrestrial beings may be anything other than humans (i.e., robots).

On the other hand, Haley had coined the term, "metalaw," in the context of space law and its relationship to possible governing laws with extraterrestrial life in galactic space (a.k.a. aliens). Haley's intent of defining metalaw for interactions with extraterrestrial beings in space was reaffirmed more than once in a 1957 paper, Space Law and Metalaw - Jurisdiction Defined, and in 1956 Congress of the International Astronautical Federation. Additionally, Haley's metalaw theory has been cited by early and modern legal scholars strictly in space law context, including his critics. Some modern scholars have argued that metalaw could be aptly used to create rules governing artificial intelligence; however, this suggestive concept narrowly applies to the relationship between humans and robotic intelligence, which is not specific to the metaverse.

=== Crime ===
The word "metaverse" first appeared in criminal law studies in 2008, Fantasy Crime: The Role of Criminal Law in Virtual Worlds, by Susan W. Brenner. Because metaverse existed in limited forms at the time of publication in 2008, Brenner anchored her analysis from Neal Stephenson's 1992 novel: Snow Crash, which is credited to be the birth of the metaverse concept by many people. In her legal analysis, Brenner addressed harms that can theoretically transfer from virtual spaces to the physical world such as virtual rape and pedophilia. Even though Brenner published her study more than a decade ago in 2008, the types of harm addressed by her paper surfaced as a common issue topic in the 2020s, where people frequently report unwanted sexual contacts and threats by other metaverse users. At the same time, Brenner examined the metaverse as a subset of virtual crimes under criminal law, as opposed to treating the metaverse law as a legal field or as a subset of cyberlaw.

=== Sub-discipline perspective ===
Some legal scholars have approached the metaverse law subject through a subclass perspective. Although these scholars have adopted the "metaverse law" terminology to represent a legal discipline, they view metaverse law as a sub-discipline of cyberlaw.

== Existing laws regulating the metaverse sector ==
There is still a lot of development needed in the Metaverse to understand the full scope of law that will be applicable in the field. Some of the laws that are currently being practiced in this field are listed below:

=== Privacy Law ===
Because companies often collect user information and share data without user knowledge as common practice, privacy experts raise concerns that immersive metaverse experience opens bigger doors for privacy abuse and surveillance by companies. So perhaps unsurprisingly, privacy has been a frequently examined topic in metaverse law and legal experts, and proponents of privacy governance argue that self-governing metaverse communities are insufficient to safeguard privacy protection of users. In a 2007 paper, Privacy in the Metaverse, Leenes distinguished metaverse from a game, arguing that metaverse is a social microcosmos whereby ordinary people develop complex social behaviors and psychological effects unique to the metaverse space. Unlike the legal practitioners who have viewed metaverse laws as a subset of existing legal frameworks, Leenes left open for readers to interpret possible privacy implications in the metaverse space by discussing government surveillance, metaverse marriage, borderless communication in common spaces, and how metaverse developers like Second Life company Linden Lab do not sufficiently address privacy concerns.

=== Copyright Law ===
The purpose of copyright law is to protect the original work of creators, artists, and writers. When discussing the Metaverse, the statute includes user-generated digital content such as avatars, virtual real estate, and artwork. Platforms such as The Sandbox enable users to construct, develop, and own 'LANDS' virtual regions. People spend tens of thousands of dollars to acquire a piece of Metaverse real estate. With the popularity of digital assets, copyright law assumes greater significance in the Metaverse.

=== Intellectual Property Laws ===
The IP law protects the creators' rights to their inventions, trademarks, and other works. With the rise in popularity of Non-Fungible Tokens, an unavoidable component of the Metaverse space, intellectual property law has become crucial for effective governance. Soon, technology companies will compete to create more sophisticated AR and VR tools, such as high-tech eyewear, headsets, etc., which will open up new industry opportunities for Intellectual Property Rights, such as new software and device patents.

=== Tort Law ===
Tort law governs civil wrongs, including both property and personal damages. In Metaverse, the law regulates any harmful activity perpetrated by users against other participants. This can include psychological distress, physical assaults, and property damage. For instance, if one person physically injures another within the Metaverse ecosystem, the injured party can file a lawsuit against the perpetrator. The law will then require the accused to pay for the injuries, medical expenses, and other damages resulting from the act.

There are other laws like defamation & overall regulation scenario of Blockchain & NFT, which depend on the type of transactions & activities done on a Metaverse platform. With time new laws and regulations may shape the future of the metaverse & laws around it.

== Terminology in legal firms ==
=== Metaverse law firms ===
Some legal practitioners have used the terminology, ''metaverse law,'' to represent their law firm's name. In other contexts, a real estate and business law firm claimed to be the first "metaverse law firm" in the metaverse. Similarly, a personal injury law firm was publicized for opening a metaverse law firm. For these legal practitioners, the usage of the phrase, metaverse law, indicates the virtual location of a law firm in the metaverse, as opposed to recognizing metaverse law as a subclass of existing legal frameworks or a specialized legal field.

=== Trademark dispute ===
Law firms using the metaverse law as their business name or description have led to a trademark dispute between at least two law firms. In Falcon Rappaport & Berkman PLLC v. Metaverse Law Corporation, Falcon filed a trademark claim against Metaverse Law in the United States District Court for the Southern District of New York, objecting that the Metaverse Law firm should not have a monopoly over the phrase "metaverse law." The United States Patent and Trademark Office's trademark registry shows that "METAVERSE LAW" is a registered trademark for Metaverse Law Corporation. The recent dispute has been settled by the parties. The parties agreed that the term "METAVERSE LAW" remains Metaverse Law's trademark and Metaverse Law maintains the right to prosecute any non-descriptive infringement of the mark's use, but descriptive uses of the term are permitted. Metaverse Law Corporation is a proponent of decentralized virtual reality spaces (as opposed to the panopticon of a singular dystopian metaverse) and advises tech companies and law firms alike on consumer privacy, ethics, and good governance inside and outside of their metaverses.

== See also ==
- Metaverse § Criticism and concerns
- Ethics of artificial intelligence
- Virtual crime
