= Crime in video games =

Representation and study of criminality in video games

Crime in video games is the depiction, simulation and study of crime, criminal justice, deviance and punishment in video games. It includes games in which criminal acts are central to the narrative or mechanics, games that model policing, courts or prisons, and academic research on how games represent crime and justice. The topic is distinct from virtual crime, which concerns wrongful acts committed in virtual worlds or online game economies, and from the narrower debate over violence and video games, which concerns possible relationships between violent game content, aggression and violent crime.

The subject has been studied in criminology, game studies, media studies, psychology, law, ethics and cultural studies. Research has examined the representation of criminality in games, the design of punishment and law enforcement systems, moral panics about violent games, and empirical claims about whether games are associated with real-world crime rates.

== Scope ==
Crime in video games may refer to criminal acts represented within a game's fiction, actions made available to players through game mechanics, or systems through which games simulate law enforcement, punishment and social control. Scholars have distinguished these questions from the broader public debate about violent video games, because a game may represent crime without being only a violent game, and because crime-related play can involve theft, fraud, policing, surveillance, imprisonment, corruption, social harm or moral choice as well as physical violence.

Game-studies writers have also noted that video games combine fictional worlds with rule-based systems. Jesper Juul described video games as involving both real rules and fictional worlds, while Miguel Sicart argued that ethical play in games depends on how players interpret and act within rule systems and fictional contexts. These approaches have been used by later scholarship to examine how crime, harm and responsibility are constructed in games.

== Development as a research topic ==
Early criminological writing on video games often appeared in relation to public concerns about violence, delinquency and media effects. Nic Groombridge argued that criminologists should treat games not only as a possible cause of crime, but also as cultural texts through which ideas about crime, punishment and justice are represented and played with.

Later scholarship broadened the topic beyond the media-effects debate. The edited collection Video Games, Crime and Next-Gen Deviance framed games as sites for studying culturally embedded harms and deviant leisure, with chapters addressing topics including swatting, gambling mechanics, white-collar crime, prison simulation, sexual violence and representation in open-world games. Levan and Downing's Crime, Punishment, and Video Games similarly examined crime and justice across games, gaming culture and the video game industry, rather than treating video games only as a cause of violence.

In Video Games, Crime, and Control, Kevin F. Steinmetz and Jonathan A. Grubb described video games as a medium through which crime, violence, control and transgression are imagined, regulated and enjoyed, connecting the study of games with criminological questions about power, deviance and social control.

== Representation and mechanics ==
=== Criminal agency and open-world play ===
The Grand Theft Auto series has been a frequent case study in scholarship on crime, open-world play, and moral panic around video games.

Many studies of crime in video games have focused on open world games, especially titles that allow players to perform criminalized actions within a simulated city or social environment. The Grand Theft Auto series has been a frequent case study because its gameplay includes vehicle theft, assault, police pursuit, organized crime and urban disorder as recurring mechanics and narrative themes.

Kiri Miller's ethnographic work on Grand Theft Auto examined how players moved between game goals, sightseeing and accidental or improvised criminal play, arguing that such games can be studied as spaces of performance and tourism as well as violence. Denham, Hirschler and Spokes later argued that the realism of Grand Theft Auto V is not limited to graphical detail, but also to how the game represents structural and capitalist violence as part of its fictional world.

=== Policing, punishment and justice systems ===
Games that include crime often model forms of punishment or enforcement. These may include wanted levels, police response systems, fines, imprisonment, reputation systems, moral choice systems or procedural rules that determine how non-player characters respond to wrongdoing. Such systems can simplify criminal justice by reducing complex legal institutions to immediate and playable feedback.

Research has also examined games in which punishment and institutional control are the central subject. In Prison Architect, for example, players design and manage a prison, making choices about surveillance, punishment, rehabilitation and institutional efficiency. Scholarship on such games has connected them to broader questions about carceral space, managerial control and the gamification of punishment.

=== Structural and white-collar crime ===
Criminological research on games has increasingly addressed crimes and harms beyond street crime and interpersonal violence. The edited volume Video Games, Crime and Next-Gen Deviance includes discussion of gambling mechanics, swatting, white-collar criminality, sexual violence and technologically mediated harm. This wider approach treats games as cultural objects that can represent or normalize social harms, economic exploitation and structural violence, not only individual criminal acts.

== Research on players and crime ==
=== Aggression and criminal violence ===
The relationship between violent video games and aggression has been widely debated. The American Psychological Association stated in 2020 that there was a small, reliable association between violent video game use and aggressive outcomes, but also said that available evidence was insufficient to support a causal link between violent video games and criminal violence.

Critics of moral-panic explanations have argued that public and political reactions to violent games often exceed the evidence linking games to real-world serious violence. Patrick Markey and Christopher Ferguson described the violent-video-game debate as a moral panic and argued that games have often been blamed after high-profile violent events despite weak evidence of a direct connection to criminal violence.

=== Time use and incapacitation ===
Some economic and criminological studies have examined whether time spent playing video games may reduce opportunities for crime, sometimes described as an incapacitation effect. Michael R. Ward analyzed relationships between video game use and crime and argued that gaming was associated with declines in some measures of crime and mortality, casting doubt on policy proposals based only on restriction.

Scott Cunningham, Benjamin Engelstätter and Michael R. Ward studied violent video game sales and crime data, arguing that policy relevance depends on whether any aggression effect is outweighed by time-use effects that keep potential offenders occupied. A study of the release of Grand Theft Auto V and registered juvenile crime in the Netherlands similarly examined whether a major game release was associated with short-term changes in recorded juvenile crime.

McCaffree and Proctor argued that much of the research on violent games had been dominated by psychological studies of aggression rather than direct measures of criminal offending, and that stronger criminological approaches were needed to evaluate relationships between games and crime.

== Online environments and virtual crime ==
Crime in video games also overlaps with legal and criminological debates about virtual environments. Susan W. Brenner used the term virtual crime to discuss whether harmful conduct in online spaces could or should be understood through criminal law. Orin S. Kerr argued that online games and virtual worlds often regulate misconduct through internal game rules, contracts and account sanctions rather than ordinary criminal law, although some conduct may still have real-world legal consequences.

This area includes disputes over theft of virtual goods, cheating in video games, harassment, swatting, gambling-like mechanics and illicit markets connected to online games. These issues differ from fictional crime inside a game narrative because they involve player conduct, real-world money, platform governance or legal claims outside the game fiction.

== Controversies ==
Public controversy about crime in video games has often focused on whether games encourage violence, delinquency or antisocial behavior. This controversy has been especially prominent around games that depict urban crime, gang activity, terrorism, school violence or police violence. Scholars have argued that these controversies often combine concern about media effects with broader anxieties about youth culture, technology and social change.

Other controversies concern the representation of criminal justice itself. Critics have examined whether games simplify policing and punishment, normalize surveillance, present incarceration as management, or treat marginalized communities primarily through crime narratives.

== See also ==
- Cybercrime
- Video game controversies
- Violence and video games
- Virtual crime
