= Electronic colonialism =

Postulate of subjecting through Internet

Electronic colonialism, sometimes called digital imperialism, digital colonialism, or eColonialism, was conceived by Herbert Schiller as documented in his 1969 book Mass Communication and American Empire. In this work, Schiller postulated the advent of a kind of technological colonialism, a system that subjugates Third World and impoverished nations to the will of world powers such as the United States, Japan, and Germany, given the necessary "importation of communication equipment and foreign-produced software".

As scholarship on this phenomenon has evolved, it has come to describe a scenario in which it has become normal for people to be exploited through data and other forms of technology. It draws parallels to colonialism in the historical sense when territories and resources were appropriated by the wealthy and powerful for profit, where dominant technology corporations establish control over digital infrastructures in ways that reproduce global inequalities and long-term dependencies.

== Background ==
Similar to the expansion and establishment of territorial colonies and protectorates by European colonial powers during the new imperialism era (as exemplified by the scramble for Africa), the information revolution ushered in a new era of socialization. Like the notion of traditional colonialism, this revolution urged multimedia conglomerates (empires) to regard audience demographics (territories) as obtainable colonies. Spurred into existence by the "demise of Communism," market globalization and rapid innovation within the communication technology sector, Electronic Colonialist Theory posits a contemporary form of neo-imperial reign. This is based not on expansive military acquisition and procurement, but rather on capturing the mind share and consumer habits of the target demographic – a psychological empire. According to the theory, as the world becomes more dependent on 21st-century communication streams and lives become inextricably entangled with cyberspace and the Internet of things (IoT), the multimedia hegemonic control will scale in stride and continue to proliferate in the future.

== History ==
With the conclusion of World War II in 1945, the multimedia and communications sector began its trans-border expansion as the advent of television became a cornerstone of advertising and consumerist trends. Prior to 1945, "there was no international communication theory." It was only after the dissolution of the Soviet Union in the early 1980s that electronic colonialism began to manifest in its contemporary form. During this era, United States President Ronald Reagan implemented his policy of "privatization, liberalization and deregulation," during what was coined the Privatization Revolution – a recasting of the American view on market forces (i.e. aggregate supply and demand), free enterprise, Laissez-faire capitalism and economic entrepreneurship. It was through this that the virulence of the multimedia inroads was magnified. The increased cross-border media flow during and after the Reagan era spurred a flurry of merger and acquisition activity. This led to a movement toward corporate consolidation that would later define the media industry's predominant growth tactic well into the 21st century (e.g. WarnerMedia).

== Digital colonialism and the Global South ==
The origination of the concept draws on early colonialists' arrival on African shores to make profit and fulfill imperial objectives through enslavement and exploitation of local labor to obtain the maximum amount of natural resources and raw materials present. This also was achieved through the building of crucial infrastructure to attain these goals and facilitate imports and exports. Colonialism in the electronic age, on the other hand, takes place through the use of digital devices, mediums and systems. According to this version, communication systems such as social media platforms and infrastructures that enable network connectivity in the Global South are present exclusively for data harvesting, profit generation, storage and analysis. These platforms act as nets that capture ordinary occurrences so that they can be marketed. Furthermore, digital colonialism can be defined as the retrieval and control of data from individuals without obtaining clear consent from them, "through communication networks developed and owned by Western tech companies." In these scenarios, individuals often develop the data that is ultimately extracted by monitoring their own activities. Sometimes this is done on their own accord, but in other instance it can be a job or contract requirement.

Through digital colonialism, Western forces such as the United States or other world powers like China construct critical and extensive digital infrastructure in the Global South to extract this data and gain monopoly over it. Large corporations design software, apps and other types of digital technology to fortify their hold on the data, as well as their stake in the tech ecosystem. In this context, the resource extracted from the continent becomes data itself. Limited data protection laws and infrastructure ease this process. This has led to a type of "tech hegemony" where technological elites in the United States have convinced people that the public must follow a ruling-class layout for operating in the digital world.

As the concept of digital colonialism has evolved, so has the way in which scholars have studied it. While some authors have looked at it as an extension of existing forms of colonialism, others have looked at it as a totally new form of oppression. The latter looks specifically at the colonialism of data, and how this practice combines the predatory nature of colonialism in the classic sense with the abstract ways value is determined in the digital age. A key idea of this theory is how it views data as natural resources that are abundant, easy to take, available to be profited from and whose exhaustion is not a problem. This views data as a byproduct of people's lives that cannot be owned, much like the air people exhale. Big Data justifies its actions by framing the work people do to create posts or disseminate other personal information as "just sharing." This personal information is viewed as a raw material that is readily available and potentially valuable. Corporations such as Google, Amazon, Apple, Facebook, Baidu, Alibaba and Tencent claim they are the only ones capable of processing such data and thus can make society a better place through this process – much like how those who perpetrated colonialism in the historical sense claimed it was a "civilization" project. In reality, people are encouraged to share their data through self-tracking platforms that put a premium on likes and followers, standout performance or gamification.

The accumulation of this information into Big data results in the generation of a digital profile for millions of users, which carry sensitive and valuable insight into the individuals. The financial weight of this information is in the ability to sell it to data brokers, which is then transformed into targeted advertising aimed at the users through the third party corporations that acquire it. This digital revolution has created a scenario in which it is not always unique people who are being targeted and influenced, but rather "data doubles." Through constant data harvesting and processing, corporations can create a digital version of consumers that can be manipulated. Platforms like Netflix structure their content and marketing around this information to suggest ways to make the streaming service easier or more personalized for its users. Research on the topic indicates a possible pitfall with machine-to-machine communication in that it is actual people tied to potential discrimination developed by algorithms. Thus, decisions on who gets a better price at a grocery story or approved for a housing loan could be subject to potentially flawed data that was collected from a data double.

The practice of interpreting this mass data generated by the infrastructure, and extracting coherent and specialized insight from it, is incredibly difficult to do. This is why only a handful of corporations dominate the sphere, and there is a subsequent lack of competition. When the force of this position is exerted on regions with limited infrastructure and data protection laws, the researchers in the area submit that the "business model transitions into a form of digital colonialism." Various projects by companies like Facebook and Alphabet specifically geared towards Africa, such as FreeBasics, ProjectAires, Project CSquared, and the now-defunct Project Loon demonstrate a further expansion of profit seeking. The idea of digital colonialism is the replication of early colonialists' infrastructure projects today in the form of digital/network connectivity infrastructure, a form of technological evangelism, according to some. In this scenario, companies such as Facebook and Alphabet generate profit from their software and Online Services in the region, rather than actually engaging in the development in long-term, local infrastructure to provide steady economic growth in the Global South.

== Digital neo-colonialism ==
As the concept of digital colonialism has evolved, so has the manner in which it has been studied. While this concept includes the harvest of data, it has expanded to other areas of the digital realm such as the hardware and infrastructure that powers the internet. This has helped bring about a need for the concept of digital neo-colonialism. Historically, the concept of neo-colonialism came about as a way to describe how Western powers exerted dominance over their former colonies despite formal independence. In turn, digital neo-colonialism illuminates more subtle, indirect forms of domination that function by pushing a "new normal" concept and involves a complicated network of public and private participants. This is the main difference from digital colonialism, which describes direct control of individuals in the digital realm by corporations/governments/state actors. Digital neo-colonialism did not replace digital colonialism. Rather, both forms of digital imperialism are very much present at the same time. A key tenet of digital neo-colonialism is in how some platforms validate their actions, particularly with "terms of service" agreements. Here, platforms present themselves as services people can voluntarily opt out of, giving the illusion of control in the scenario. The case of the Internet Corporation for Assigned Names and Numbers (ICANN) provides an example of this. ICANN is a nonprofit made up of multiple stakeholders dedicated to ensuring the safety and stability of the internet by maintaining and operating a number of databases, including IP address and domain name systems. Originally under the auspices of the United States, over the years it became clear that ICANN was marginalizing the Global South. Even after the U.S. gave up direct control of the nonprofit to multiple stakeholders in 2016, the country's free-market principles and corporate culture remained largely baked into the structure of the organization. Thus, many of ICANN's decisions continued to marginalize the Global South despite the United States not having direct control of the organization.

== Methods of resistance ==
A number of scholars have offered possible options for resisting digital imperialism, with most noting that more research needs to be conducted in the field. The most common refrain is a need for awareness. Understanding that digital colonialism exists and how it functions is a critical first step toward resistance. Decentralization of the internet away from hubs like the United States and China also is seen as a possible avenue for resisting digital colonialism. Some authors have explored more active solutions to resistance, including data-flooding software designed to confuse algorithms and wearable masks or tattoos that can befuddle facial recognition. In another example, coding designed to alter databases have been placed over license plates by drivers to trick traffic enforcement cameras. Rather than record the license plate, the coding instructs the traffic software to delete its database. Legislation that prevents large technology corporations from capitalizing on user data is viewed as a more realistic avenue for making a lasting impact.

== See also ==
- Cultural imperialism
- Data colonialism
- Internet.org
- Surveillance capitalism
- Zero-rating
