= Artificial intelligence in spirituality =

Belief that AI has supernatural or divine powers

Some users of artificial intelligence (AI) technologies, especially chatbots, may develop beliefs that AI has or can attain supernatural or spiritual powers. AI models such as ChatGPT are believed by some users to be capable of and or facilitate the action of fortune telling, mysticism and remote viewing. Recent and sudden advances in large language models have led to folk myths about their origin or capabilities, as well as their deification or worship by some users. Some people attempted to resurrect the likeness of deceased individuals through AI in what has been compared to spiritualist seances.

Pope Leo XIV advised priests against using large language models when it came to the creation of sermons. He has also expressed concerns regarding AI in the encyclical Magnifica humanitas.

An NPR/Ipsos poll found that 11% of AI users "have sought spiritual guidance from artificial intelligence" and that 6% currently use it for that purpose; in addition 13% have "used the technology to generate prayers" and 15% admit to having used it for scriptural study. NPR noted that while 6% seems like a small amount, the total number of Jews, Muslims, Hindus and Buddhists combined in the United States is around 6% according to the Religious Landscape Study.

Some scholars have identified common traits like transhumanism, extropianism, singularitarianism, cosmism, rationalism, effective altruism, and longtermism—what Émile P. Torres and Timnit Gebru have dubbed TESCREAL—as constituting a sort of secular religion developing around AI.

== See also ==
- AI-induced psychosis – Psychological phenomenon
- Artificial intimacy – Humans falling in love with artificial entities
- Cargo cult – New religious movement
- Catholic Church and artificial intelligence
- Dataism – Ideology created by big data
- Quantum mysticism – Pseudoscience claiming to build on quantum mechanics
- Roko's basilisk – AI thought experiment
- Superintelligence – Hypothetical agent surpassing human intelligence
- TempleOS – Biblically-themed operating system
- Theta Noir – AI-focused religious movement
- Way of the Future – Religious organization for worshipping AI
