= Virtual crime =

Virtual criminal act

Virtual crime can be described as a criminal act conducted in a virtual world – usually massively multiplayer online role-playing games (MMORPGs). To grasp the definition of virtual crime, the modern interpretation of the term "virtual" must be assessed to portray the implications of virtual crime. In this sense, virtual crime describes those online acts that “evoke the effects of real crime” but are not widely considered to be prosecutable acts. Virtual crime is distinct from Crime in video games, which concerns the representation, simulation, and study of criminality within video games rather than wrongful acts committed by users in virtual spaces.

There are several interpretations of the term "virtual crime". One scholar defined virtual crime as needing to have all the qualities of a real crime, and so it was not a new subset of crime at all. It is difficult to prove that there are real-life implications of virtual crime, thus it is not widely accepted as prosecutable.

Examples of virtual crimes include mugging, sexual assault, theft, and construction of sweatshops — all of which are usually committed within virtual worlds, metaverses and economies.

== Terminology ==
MMORPG - Massively multiplayer online role-playing game, which is a video game that combines aspects of a role-playing video game and a massively multiplayer online game. MMORPGs are a platform susceptible to virtual crime.

MMOG or MMO - Massively multiplayer online game, which is an online video game with a large number of players on the same server. MMOGs are also platforms susceptible to virtual crime.

Metaverse - In science fiction, the metaverse is a hypothetical iteration of the Internet as a single, universal, and immersive virtual world facilitated by the use of virtual reality (VR), augmented reality (AR), and mixed/extended reality (MR/XR) headsets. In colloquial usage, a metaverse is a network of 3D virtual worlds focused on social and economic connection. In scientific research, it is defined as “a three-dimensional online environment in which users represented by avatars interact with each other in virtual spaces decoupled from the real physical world”.

Virtual world - Also called a virtual space, a virtual world is a computer-simulated environment which may be populated by many users who can create a personal avatar, simultaneously and independently explore the virtual world, participate in its activities, and communicate with others. This is where virtual crime takes place.

Virtual economy - Also called a synthetic economy, a virtual economy exists within a virtual world, and users utilize it to buy, sell, and invest in virtual items, services, and properties. With the rise of virtual worlds, virtual economies see an increase in usage, demand, and currency exchange within, much like in real life. In 2014, the exchange of currency for virtual property in Second Life, a popular virtual world, was US$3.2 billion. For perspective, this was the estimated combined annual trade for virtual economies in 2004.

Individuals or players within virtual worlds explore, build their characters, and collect items through gameplay or various tasks. These goods and services carry demonstrable value standard conceptions of economic value because players are willing to substitute real economic resources of time and money (monthly fees) in exchange for these resources. However, in most games, players do not own, materially or intellectually, any part of the game world, and merely pay to use it. The ownership players have over in-game assets has evolved with the emergence of blockchain games.

As virtual worlds become more popular and we see the rise of virtual economies, many issues and many opportunities rise as well. For example, eBay, along with specialist trading sites, have allowed players to sell their wares. This has attracted fraudulent sales as well as theft. Many game developers, such as Blizzard Entertainment (responsible for World of Warcraft), oppose and even prohibit the practice.

In the online world of Britannia, the currency of one Annum equates to about $3.4 US. If someone were to steal another player's virtual currency, they could convert it to US dollars via PayPal, though this problem has not yet been reported. This stems controversy over whether or not this should be dealt with like real crime, as there are real-life implications.

== Types of virtual crime ==
=== Virtual sexual assault ===
While not resulting in physical injury or physical assault, virtual sexual assault can inflict emotional harm and psychological trauma. One of the earliest reported instances of virtual sexual assault occurred in 1993 in the computer programming world of LambdaMOO. In 2007, a Belgian citizen reported an instance of non-consensual sexual activity in the virtual world Second Life to Belgian police.

In 2005, in the game The Sims Online, a 17-year-old boy going by the in-game name "Evangeline" was discovered to have built a cyber-brothel, where customers would pay sim-money for minutes of cybersex. This led to the cancellation of his accounts but no legal action, mainly because he was above the age of consent in his area.

In July 2018, a mother in the United States posted on Facebook that her daughter's avatar on Roblox had been gang raped by two other users. Roblox stated that it was outraged that a "bad actor" had violated its community policies and rules of conduct, and that they had zero tolerance over such acts. The incident led to The Village Voice reprinting its 1993 article, "A Rape in Cyberspace". In July 2021, a formally convicted sex offender was arrested in Illinois for allegedly grooming and soliciting a minor through the use of Roblox.

In November 2021, a beta user of Horizon Worlds reported being groped in-game and that other users supported the conduct. Meta responded that there are built-in tools to block interactions with other users, which are not enabled by default, and that although the incident was "absolutely unfortunate," it provides good feedback in making the blocking feature "trivially easy and findable." A month later on Horizon Worlds, metaverse researcher and psychotherapist Nina Jane Patel reported that her avatar was gang-raped within 60 seconds of joining the platform. Elena Martellozzo, an associate professor of criminology at Middlesex University says that such abuse may be the result of disinhibition due to the lack of face-to-face interaction that is exacerbated on the metaverse.

In 2022, a BBC News researcher posing as a 13-year-old girl on VRChat was approached by adult men and directed to sex shops. BBC News also reported that a safety campaigner knows of children who were groomed in games and forced to take part in virtual sex.

More examples of sexual assault in the virtual reality space include an incident in 2021 — Chanelle Siggens logged into the virtual reality game Population One and another player simulated groping and ejaculating on her.

In 2024, the BBC reported that police were investigating a virtual sexual assault case.

=== Sweatshops ===
The virtual economies of many MMOs, and the exchange of virtual items and currency for real money, have resulted in the existence of in-game sweatshops. In virtual sweatshops, workers in the developing world — typically China, although there have been reports of this type of activity in Eastern European countries — earn real-world wages for long days spent monotonously performing in-game tasks. Instances typically involve farming of resources or currency, which has given rise to the epithet Chinese Adena Farmer, because of its first reported widespread use in Lineage II.

More egregious cases involve using exploits such as duping currency or items. There have also been reports of collusion or vertical integration among farmers and virtual currency exchanges. In 2002, a company called Blacksnow Interactive, a game currency exchange, admitted to using workers in a "virtual sweatshop" in Tijuana, Mexico to farm money and items from Ultima Online and Dark Age of Camelot. When Mythic Entertainment cracked down on the practice, Blacksnow attempted to sue the game company.

=== Virtual theft ===
In November 2007, it was reported that a Dutch teenager had been arrested for allegedly stealing virtual furniture from "rooms" in 3D social-networking service Habbo Hotel. The teenagers involved were accused of creating fake Habbo websites in order to lure users into entering their account details, which would then be used to steal virtual furniture bought with real money totaling €4,000.

In China, Qiu Chengwei was sentenced to life in prison in 2005 after stabbing and killing fellow The Legend of Mir 3 gamer Zhu Caoyuan. In the game Qiu had lent Zhu a powerful sword (a "dragon sabre"), which Zhu then went on to sell on eBay for 7,200 yuan (about £473 or US$870).

=== Virtual mugging ===
The term "virtual mugging" was coined in Japan in 2005 when a player of Lineage II used bots to defeat other players’ characters and take their items. The Kagawa prefectural police arrested a Chinese foreign exchange student on Aug. 16 following the reports of virtual mugging and online sales of the stolen items.

== Punishment ==
In Sweden, a man threatened the families of 26 underage girls if they did not perform sexual acts online – he was sentenced to 10 years in prison and made to pay $131,590 in damages. Official prosecution proceedings regarding virtual crime currently exist in countries like Sweden but not for a majority of the modern world.

== See also ==
- Social media and suicide
- Griefer
- Kill stealing
- Virtual world
- Virtual economy
- MMORPG
- Metaverse law
- Smurfing (similar to internet sockpuppetry)

== External references ==
- Lastowka, Greg (2010). Virtual Justice. Yale University Press. ISBN 978-0-300-14120-7.
- Thomas-Gabriel Rüdiger: Sex offenders in the virtual worlds. Brandenburg 2013
- Thomas-Gabriel Rüdiger: The Real World of Sexual Predators and Online Gaming . Be a kids hero, 2015
- Susan W. Brenner. Is There Such a Thing as "Virtual Crime"? 4 Cal. Crim. Law Rev. 1
- 7 July 2005. "Wage Slaves" at 1up.com. Retrieved 19 August 2005
- 7 February 2005. "Virtual worlds wind up in real world's courts at MSNBC. Retrieved 19 August 2005
- Lastowka, Greg and Hunter, Dan. "Virtual Crimes" New York Law School Law Review.
- Diana Selck, Thomas-Gabriel Rüdiger: Online games as risk generators for children and adolescents – Analysing risk factors in gaming environments criminologia, 2016
