= Léocadie Lushombo =

Congolese theologian

Léocadie Wabo Lushombo is a Congolese Catholic theologian and academic, whose research "focuses on Christian ethical thought with particular attention to African, feminist, and womanist perspectives." She presently teaches theological ethics at Santa Clara University Jesuit School of Theology.

She is a member of the Teresian Association. Before becoming an academic, she worked for NGOs across Central Africa and Latin America.

In 2024 she was appointed by the Vatican secretariat of the Synod of Bishops as a member of a study group examining issues of poverty and environmental damage raised at the Synod on Synodality. In March 2026, Pope Leo XIV appointed her as a lay member of the Dicastery for Promoting Integral Human Development; later that year, she was one of six guests invited to speak at the launch of Leo's first encyclical, Magnifica humanitas, where she commented on the impact of AI proliferation and development on the Global South.

== Books ==
- Globalization and The New Political Order (2026), co-edited with Joseph Ogbonnaya
- African Women’s Liberating Philosophies, Theologies, and Ethics (2024), co-edited with Beatrice Okyere-Manu
- A Christian and African Ethic of Women’s Political Participation: Living As Risen Beings (2023)
