= Data colonialism =

Form of neocolonialism based on exploitation of data production

Data colonialism is the practice by which governments, organizations, and corporations extract, control, or profit from data produced by individuals—often relying on low-wage labor or asserting ownership over users' digital activities. Scholars describe it as a contemporary extension of colonial and neocolonial logics, where technological infrastructures enable new forms of resource appropriation and power asymmetry.

== Concept ==
Data colonialism combines historical forms of colonial appropriation with contemporary systems of data extraction. The term appears to have been first coined, or notably used, by Nick Couldry and Ulises A. Mejias. In their book The Costs of Connection : How Data Is Colonizing Human Life and Appropriating It for Capitalism published in 2019, Couldry and Mejias argue that the data economy reorganizes human life into a continuous source of raw material for capitalist accumulation. This process involves both large-scale capture of user-generated data and the deployment of low-cost labor forces to annotate, classify, or process that data for technologies such as artificial intelligence (AI).

Scholars emphasize that control over data flows grants significant political, economic, and cultural power. Corporations and governments can shape markets, influence behavior, and build predictive systems by monopolizing access to data and the algorithms that operate on it.

Others describe data colonialism as involving the transformation of digital spaces into new “frontiers,” where data is treated as a resource to be claimed and enclosed. In this view, data extraction can reproduce existing social inequalities, with value and control distributed along familiar lines of race, gender, and power. These dynamics echo historical patterns in which resources are appropriated first, while questions of equity are addressed only afterward.

== Labor and the AI industry ==
The rapid expansion of the AI sector has increased global demand for data annotation and content moderation. Companies outsource data-labeling tasks—such as tagging images, transcribing audio, and classifying text—to workers in low-income countries. Reporting has documented how countries including Kenya, the Philippines, and Venezuela have become hubs for this type of labor, often performed for extremely low wages.

Recent scholarship situates data colonialism within global development dynamics, arguing that data extraction can reinforce structural dependencies between regions and reproduce asymmetries in control over digital infrastructure and knowledge production. Critics further argue that these practices reproduce neocolonial economic structures: wealthier nations and corporations extract value from workers with limited bargaining power. At the same time, the benefits of AI technologies primarily accrue in the Global North. This dynamic has sparked debates about ethical sourcing of data, digital rights, fair compensation, and global inequalities within the AI economy.

== See also ==
- Electronic colonialism
- Ethics of artificial intelligence
- Global digital divide
- Neocolonialism
- Surveillance capitalism
