= Catholic Church and artificial intelligence =

The Catholic Church views artificial intelligence as a significant technological development that must be governed by strict ethical principles rooted in human dignity and the common good.

In January 2025, the Church issued the doctrinal note Antiqua et nova co-issued by the Dicastery for the Doctrine of the Faith and the Dicastery for Culture and Education. It addresses the "relationship between artificial intelligence and human intelligence" and offers reflections on the "anthropological and ethical challenges raised by AI".

In August 2025, Time magazine included Pope Leo XIV in its 2025 list of the World’s Most Influential People in Artificial Intelligence.

In May 2026, Pope Leo XIV approved the creation of a new Vatican commission on artificial intelligence. He released his first papal encyclical, titled Magnifica humanitas, on the topic later in the month.
