= Antiqua et nova =

2025 Catholic doctrinal note

- Ratified: 14 January 2025
- Date effective: 28 January 2025
- Commissioned by: Dicastery for the Doctrine of the Faith; Dicastery for Culture and Education
- Signatories: Víctor Manuel Fernández; José Tolentino de Mendonça
- Subject: Relationship Between Artificial Intelligence and Human Intelligence

Official website
- English text on vatican.va

Antiqua et nova (Latin for 'Ancient and new') is a doctrinal note of the Catholic Church co-issued by the Dicastery for the Doctrine of the Faith and the Dicastery for Culture and Education in January 2025. It addresses the "relationship between artificial intelligence [AI] and human intelligence" and offers reflections on the "anthropological and ethical challenges raised by AI".

== Background ==
With the substantial increase in the proliferation and usage of large language models such as ChatGPT, Pope Francis expressed concerns about a technocratic future and transparency in the development of further artificial intelligence technologies at the 2024 G7 summit. He also addressed the topic in his October 2024 encyclical Dilexit nos. The Vatican City State enacted laws about the usage of AI on 1 January 2025.

On 14 January 2025, Pope Francis met with Cardinal Víctor Manuel Fernández, prefect of the Dicastery for the Doctrine of the Faith, and approved the draft document of Antiqua et nova. The following day, Fernández announced the pending publication of a document on AI which was released on 28 January 2025.

== Summary ==
Antiqua et nova is a 30-page-long document known as a note. The document's name is derived from its first words in Latin, corresponding to "ancient and new" in the English version. The document, in 117 paragraphs, addresses challenges and opportunities in AI in the fields of education, economy, work, health, relationships, and war.

The note calls attention to workers becoming "deskilled" and becoming more subject to harsh, repetitive labor and surveillance. It also warns of students failing to develop critical thinking skills, while cautiously noting prudential use of AI can help provide instant critiques. Regarding war, the note declares of "grave ethical concern" are autonomous lethal weapons systems without direct human intervention or control. It also draws attention to environmental concerns about the use of water and energy needed to run the necessary hardware for AI. The document expresses serious concerns about deepfakes and false information generated by AI, as well as further privacy issues surrounding surveillance and expressing matters of conscience to chat models. It warns of a technocratic control of society, with large companies exerting significant social and political influence capable of manipulating consciences and democratic process.

The document concludes that artificial intelligence must only be used to complement human intelligence rather than replacing it, as a replacement would enslave humanity and serve as a "substitute for God".

== See also ==
- Magnifica humanitas – 2026 encyclical of Pope Leo XIV
