= List of psychiatry journals =

The following is a list of journals in the field of psychiatry. Psychiatry journals generally publish articles with either a general focus (meaning all aspects of psychiatry are included) or with a more specific focus. This list includes notable psychiatry journal articles sorted by name and focus within psychiatry.

Journal Name	Focus	Publisher	Language	Publication Dates
Acta Neuropsychiatrica	Neuropsychiatry	Cambridge University Press	English	1989-present
Acta Psychiatrica Scandinavica	General	Wiley-Blackwell	English	1926–present
Actas Españolas de Psiquiatría	General	Fundación Juan José López-Ibor	English, Spanish	1940–present
Addiction	Addiction	Wiley-Blackwell	English	1884–present
American Journal of Psychiatry	General	American Psychiatric Association	English	1844–present
Archives of General Psychiatry	General	American Medical Association	English	1959–present
Arquivos de Neuro-Psiquiatria	General	Academia Brasileira de Neurologia	English	1943–present
Australasian Psychiatry	General	SAGE Publications	English	1993–present
Australian and New Zealand Journal of Psychiatry	General	SAGE Publications	English	1967–present
Behavior Genetics	Genetics	Springer Science+Business Media	English	1971–present
Behavioral and Brain Functions	Behavior	BioMed Central	English	2005–present
The Bekhterev Review of Psychiatry and Medical Psychology	General	Media Medica	Russian	1896–present
Biological Psychiatry	General	Elsevier	English	1959–present
British Journal of Psychiatry	General	Royal College of Psychiatrists	English	1853–present
Canadian Journal of Psychiatry	General	Canadian Psychiatric Association	English, French	1956–present
Cultural Diversity and Ethnic Minority Psychology	Minorities	American Psychological Association	English	1995–present
Current Psychiatry Reports	General	Spring Science+Business Media	English	1999–present
European Neuropsychopharmacology	Pharmacology	Elsevier	English	1990–present
European Psychiatry	General	Elsevier	English	1986–present
Evidence-Based Mental Health	General	BMJ Group	English	1998–present
General Psychiatry	General	BMJ Publishing Group	English	1959–present
Genes, Brain and Behavior	Genetics	Wiley-Blackwell	English	2002–present
Indian Journal of Psychiatry	General	Medknow Publications	English	1949–present
International Journal of Geriatric Psychiatry	Geriatrics	John Wiley & Sons	English	1986–present
International Journal of Psychoanalytic Psychotherapy	General	Jason Aronson	English	1974–1985
Issues in Mental Health Nursing	Nursing	Taylor & Francis	English	1978–present
JAMA Psychiatry	General	American Medical Association	English	1959–present
Journal of Autism and Developmental Disorders	Autism	Springer Science+Business Media	English	1971–present
Journal of Clinical Psychiatry	Clinical	Physicians Postgraduate Press	English	1940–present
Journal of Clinical Psychopharmacology	Pharmacology	Lippincott Williams & Wilkins	English	1981–present
Journal of Geriatric Psychiatry and Neurology	Geriatric	SAGE Publications	English	1988–present
Journal of Nervous and Mental Disease	General	Lippincott Williams & Wilkins	English	1874–present
Journal of Psychiatry and Neuroscience	Neuroscience	Canadian Medical Association	English	1976–present
The Lancet Psychiatry	General	Elsevier	English	
Mens Sana Monographs	General	Medknow Publications	English	2003–present
Molecular Psychiatry	Molecular	Nature Publishing Group	English	1997–present
Neuropsychopharmacology			English	1987–present
Nezavisimiy Psikhiatricheskiy Zhurnal (The Independent Psychiatric Journal)			Russian	1991–present
Philosophy, Psychiatry, & Psychology	Philosophy of psychiatry, philosophy of psychology	Johns Hopkins University Press	English	1993–present
Psychiatric Genetics			English	1990–present
Psychiatry and Clinical Neurosciences	General	Wiley-Blackwell	English	1933–present
Psychiatry MMC			English	
Psychology and Psychotherapy: Theory, Research and Practice			English	
Psychological Medicine			English	1969–present
Psychopathology			English	1897–present
Psychosis			English	2009–present
Psychosomatic Medicine			English	1939–present
Psychosomatics			English	1960–present
The Radical Therapist				
Revista Brasileira de Psiquiatria			English, Portuguese, Spanish	1979–present
Russian Journal of Psychiatry	General	V. Serbsky NMRCPN	Russian, English	1997–present
Schizophrenia Bulletin	Schizophrenia	Oxford University Press	English	1969–present
Schizophrenia Research	Schizophrenia	Elsevier	English	1988–present
Translational Psychiatry	Biological psychiatry, translational medicine	Nature Publishing Group	English	2011–present
Twin Research and Human Genetics			English	1998–present
World Psychiatry	General	World Psychiatric Association	Arabic, Chinese, English, French, Russian, Spanish, Turkish	2002–present
