= Kenneth L. Davis =

Kenneth L. Davis, MD
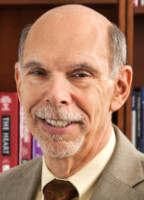
- Education: Mount Sinai School of Medicine, Stanford University School of Medicine, Stanford University Hospital
- Occupation: Executive vice chairperson of the board of trustees at the Mount Sinai Health System
- Known for: Psychiatry
- Medical career
- Field: Psychiatry, Alzheimer's disease, schizophrenia
- Institutions: Mount Sinai Health System
- Notable works: Alzheimer's Disease Assessment Scale
- Awards: George H. W. Bush Lifetime of Leadership Award
- Website: Kenneth L. Davis, MD

Kenneth L. Davis is the executive vice chairperson of the board of trustees at the Mount Sinai Health System in New York City, and an American author and medical researcher who developed the Alzheimer's Disease Assessment Scale, the most widely used tool to test the efficacy of treatments for Alzheimer's disease designed specifically to evaluate the severity of cognitive and noncognitive behavioral dysfunctions characteristic to persons with Alzheimer's disease. His research led to four of the first five FDA-approved drugs for Alzheimer's.

== Biography ==
Education

Davis graduated magna cum laude from Yale College in 1969 and was the valedictorian of Mount Sinai School of Medicine's second graduating class in 1973 with his M.D., where he received the Harold Elster Memorial Award for highest academic achievement. Supplementary graduate medical education was later completed at Stanford University.

Career

In 1979, Davis was made chief of psychiatry at Bronx Veteran's Affairs Medical Center, where he became the first director of its Schizophrenia Biological Research Center. From 1987 until 2003, he was chairman of psychiatry at Mount Sinai School of Medicine.

In 2003, Davis was appointed dean of Mount Sinai School of Medicine and held that position until 2007, when he was succeeded by Dennis S. Charney, M.D. Davis was also appointed as the president and CEO of Mount Sinai Medical Center in 2003 – a position he held until 2024. In 2015, Davis had gross compensation from the Icahn School of Medicine at Mount Sinai of $4,147,755. He is the director of the Mount Sinai Silvio Conte Neuroscience Center, trustee of the New York Academy of Medicine, trustee of the Aspen Institute, and chair of the New York Academy of Medicine Deans Council. In addition, he has served as chairman of the board of governors for the Greater New York Hospital Association.

In September 2013, when Mount Sinai Medical Center merged with Continuum Health Partners, Davis became the president and CEO of the Mount Sinai Health System. In 2017, his annual salary was $12 million.

Davis has weighed in on the intersection of health and public policy, arguing that the National Institutes of Health should receive more funds to fight disease and calling drug prices 'outrageous' and a fair trade issue.

Awards and recognition

- Career Development Award, Veterans Administration
- A.E. Bennett Award of the Society of Biological Psychiatry
- American Psychiatric Association Award for Research in Psychiatry
- Elected member, Institute of Medicine, National Academy of Science
- President, American College of Neuropsychopharmacology
- 2009 George H. W. Bush Lifetime of Leadership Award
- Ranked 50 in Modern Healthcare's list of the 100 Most Influential in Healthcare, 2021

== Research ==
=== Alzheimer's research ===
Davis participated in breakthrough proof-of-concept studies and clinical trials of cholinesterase inhibitors. These trials (the first multicenter ones for cholinesterase inhibitors) established efficacy and ultimately led to the first four of the five FDA-approved compounds for treating the symptoms of Alzheimer's: tacrine, rivastigmine, galantamine, donepezil and memantine

In 1978, Davis, together with Richard Mohs, conducted the first well-controlled study of a drug that was shown able to improve the storage and retrieval functions of long-term memory in humans.

In 1987, Davis participated in the first study providing strong evidence that Alzheimer's risk is inherited.

His Alzheimer Disease Assessment Scale (ADAS) is one of two primary cognitive measures used for all Food and Drug Administration (FDA) Altzheimer's-related clinical drug trials in the US.

While at Mount Sinai Hospital, Davis and his associates have been at the forefront in the delineation of the role of amyloid in Alzheimer's disease, and were among the first to report the cloning and chromosomal location of the amyloid precursor protein, regarded as one of the most important discoveries in Alzheimer's research in the previous 15 years.

=== Schizophrenia research ===
Davis's work on schizophrenia has shown that oligodendroglia cells and myelin play roles in the disease's pathophysiology and that dopamine – long thought to be merely hyperactive in a schizophrenic brain – is actually hypoactive in different regions.

His paper, "Dopamine in schizophrenia—a review and reconceptualization" (American Journal of Psychiatry, 148-11: 1474–86, November 1991) is the third most-cited paper on schizophrenia research in its decade.

While studies have shown that individuals born in winter months are disproportionately likely to develop schizophrenia, Davis participated in a 2006 study that demonstrated that this disproportionality also exists in tropical regions, ruling out cold weather as the cause.

== Publications ==
=== Editor and editorial roles ===
- Alzheimer Disease and Associated Disorders
- American Journal of Psychiatry
- Biological Psychiatry
- Clinical Neuropharmacology
- Clinical Neuroscience Research
- Current Research in Alzheimer’s Disease
- Current Psychiatry Reports
- Harvard Review of Psychiatry
- International Journal of Geriatric Psychiatry
- International Journal of Geriatric Psychopharmacology
- Journal of Alzheimer’s Disease
- Journal of Experimental Cognitive and Behavioral Neuroscience
- Journal of Geriatric Psychiatry and Neurology
- Journal of Psychiatric Research
- Journal of the American Geriatrics Society
- Molecular Psychiatry
- Neuropsychopharmacology
- Schizophrenia Research An International Multidisciplinary Journal
- Sociedade de Psiquiatria Do Rio Grande Do Sul
- Translational Psychiatry

=== Books ===
- Alzheimer's Disease: Questions and Answers by Kenneth Davis and Kenneth L Davis and Paul S. Aisen and Deborah B. Marin, Softcover, Merit Pub Intl, ISBN 1-873413-36-X (1-873413-36-X)
- Brain Acetylcholine and Neuropsychiatric Disease by Philip A. Berger and Kenneth L Davis, Hardcover, Plenum Press, ISBN 0-306-40157-6 (0-306-40157-6)
- Neuropsychopharmacology: The Fifth Generation of Progress by American College of Neuropsychopharmacology and Joseph T. Coyle and Charles Nemeroff and Dennis Charney and Kenneth L Davis, Hardcover, Lippincott Williams & Wilkins, ISBN 0-7817-2837-1 (0-7817-2837-1)
- Alzheimer's Disease: A Report of Progress in Research S Corkin, J Growdon, E Usdin, KL Davis, RJ Wurtman (eds.). Raven Press, New York, NY, 1982. ISBN 0890046859
- Handbook for Clinical Memory Assessment of Older Adults LW Poon (editor) KL Davis, et al (Associate Editors) American Psychological Association, Hyattsville, MD, 1986. ISBN 978-0912704425
- Advisory Panel on Alzheimer’s Disease. Report of the Advisory Panel on Alzheimer’s Disease DHHS Pub. No. (ADM)89-1644. Washington, DC: Supt. Of Docs., U.S. Govt. Print. Off., 1989.
- Advisory Panel on Alzheimer’s Disease Second Report of the Advisory Panel on Alzheimer’s Disease. DHHS Pub. No. (ADM)91-1791. Washington, DC: Supt. Of Docs., U.S. Govt. Print Off., 1991.
- Foundations of Psychiatry KL Davis, H Klar and JT Coyle (eds.). W.B. Saunders, Philadelphia, PA, 1991. ISBN 0721613411

=== Articles ===
According to ResearchGate, Davis' peer-reviewed articles have been cited 28,265 times. He is credited with more than 575 articles. Select list:

- Ripke, Stephan, et al. "Biological insights from 108 schizophrenia-associated genetic loci." Nature 511.7510 (2014): 421. Cited: 5762
- Rosen, Wilma G., Richard C. Mohs, and Kenneth L. Davis. "A new rating scale for Alzheimer's disease." The American journal of psychiatry (1984). Cited: 4701
- Davis, Kenneth L., et al. "Dopamine in schizophrenia: a review and reconceptualization." The American journal of psychiatry (1991). Cited: 2807
- Näslund, Jan, et al. "Correlation between elevated levels of amyloid β-peptide in the brain and cognitive decline." Jama 283.12 (2000): 1571-1577. Cited: 1591
- Coccaro, Emil F., et al. "Serotonergic studies in patients with affective and personality disorders: correlates with suicidal and impulsive aggressive behavior." Archives of general psychiatry 46.7 (1989): 587-599. Cited: 1520
- Hakak, Yaron, et al. "Genome-wide expression analysis reveals dysregulation of myelination-related genes in chronic schizophrenia." Proceedings of the National Academy of Sciences 98.8 (2001): 4746-4751. Cited: 1433
- Siever, Larry J., and Kenneth L. Davis. "A psychobiological perspective on the personality disorders." The American journal of psychiatry (1991). Cited: 1166
