= Brazilian Journal =

Brazilian Journal may refer to:

- Brazilian Journal of Chemical Engineering
- Brazilian Journal of Geology
- Brazilian Journal of Physics
- Brazilian Journal of Probability and Statistics
- Brazilian Journal of Population Studies
- Brazilian Journal of Psychiatry
- Journal of the Brazilian Chemical Society
