= Glenda MacQueen =

Canadian medical researcher (1965–2020)

- Born: January 11, 1965; Sydney, Nova Scotia, Canada
- Died: March 27, 2020 (aged 55); Calgary, Alberta, Canada
- Occupations: Medical researcher, medical school professor and administrator

Glenda Marlene MacQueen (January 11, 1965 – March 27, 2020) was a Canadian medical researcher and medical college professor and administrator. She was vice-dean of the Cumming School of Medicine at the University of Calgary from 2012 to 2019.

== Early life ==
Glenda Marlene MacQueen was born in Sydney, Nova Scotia, and raised on Cape Breton Island. Her parents were Donald Gordon MacQueen and Anita Marie Walker MacQueen. She attended Mount Allison University as an undergraduate. She earned a PhD in psychology and a medical degree, both from McMaster University, where she also served a residency in psychiatry.

== Career ==
MacQueen worked at McMaster University Medical Centre until 2008, when she joined the faculty of the Cumming School of Medicine at the University of Calgary. She was academic head of the school's psychiatry department, and vice-dean of the school from 2012 to 2019. She helped establish and lead the school's Mathison Centre for Mental Health Research and Education, and the university's Mental Health Strategy. Her research involved neurobiology, especially regarding mood disorders, and was published in journals including Science, Social Science & Medicine, Biological Psychiatry, The American Journal of Psychiatry, Journal of Psychiatry & Neuroscience, Molecular Psychiatry, and Acta Psychiatrica Scandinavica.

MacQueen received the Douglas Utting award in 2011, and the Heinz Lehmann Award in 2014, from the Canadian College of Neuropsychopharmacology. She received the J. M. Cleghorn Award from the Canadian Psychiatric Association in 2017. She was elected a fellow of the Canadian Academy of Health Sciences in 2018. She served on the board of directors of the Canadian Network for Mood and Anxiety Treatments (CANMAT), and the Brain Canada Foundation, and on the editorial boards of the Canadian Journal of Psychiatry and the Journal of Psychiatry and Neuroscience. She was on the scientific advisory board of the Royal Institute for Mental Health Research.

== Personal life ==
Glenda MacQueen married Alex Memedovich. They had three children. She died from breast cancer in 2020, aged 55 years, in Calgary.
