= Revista Brasileira de Química =

- Discipline: Chemistry
- Language: Portuguese

Publication details
- History: 1936–1978
- Publisher: Revista Brasileira de Química (Brazil)

Standard abbreviations
- ISO 4: Rev. Bras. Quím. (São Paulo)

Indexing
- CODEN: RBQSAO
- ISSN: 0370-3797

The Revista Brasileira de Química was a scientific journal of chemistry published from 1936 to 1978. The journal is also called Revista Brasileira de Química: Ciencia e Indústria. The publisher was the Revista Brasileira de Química itself in São Paulo, publication ceased in 1978.

== See also ==
- Anais da ABQ
- Eclética Química
- Journal of the Brazilian Chemical Society
- Revista Brasileira de Engenharia Química, Caderno de Engenharia Química
- Revista Brasileira de Chímica
- Southern Brazilian Journal of Chemistry
- Química Nova
