= Vanderlan da Silva Bolzani =

Brazilian chemist (born 1949)

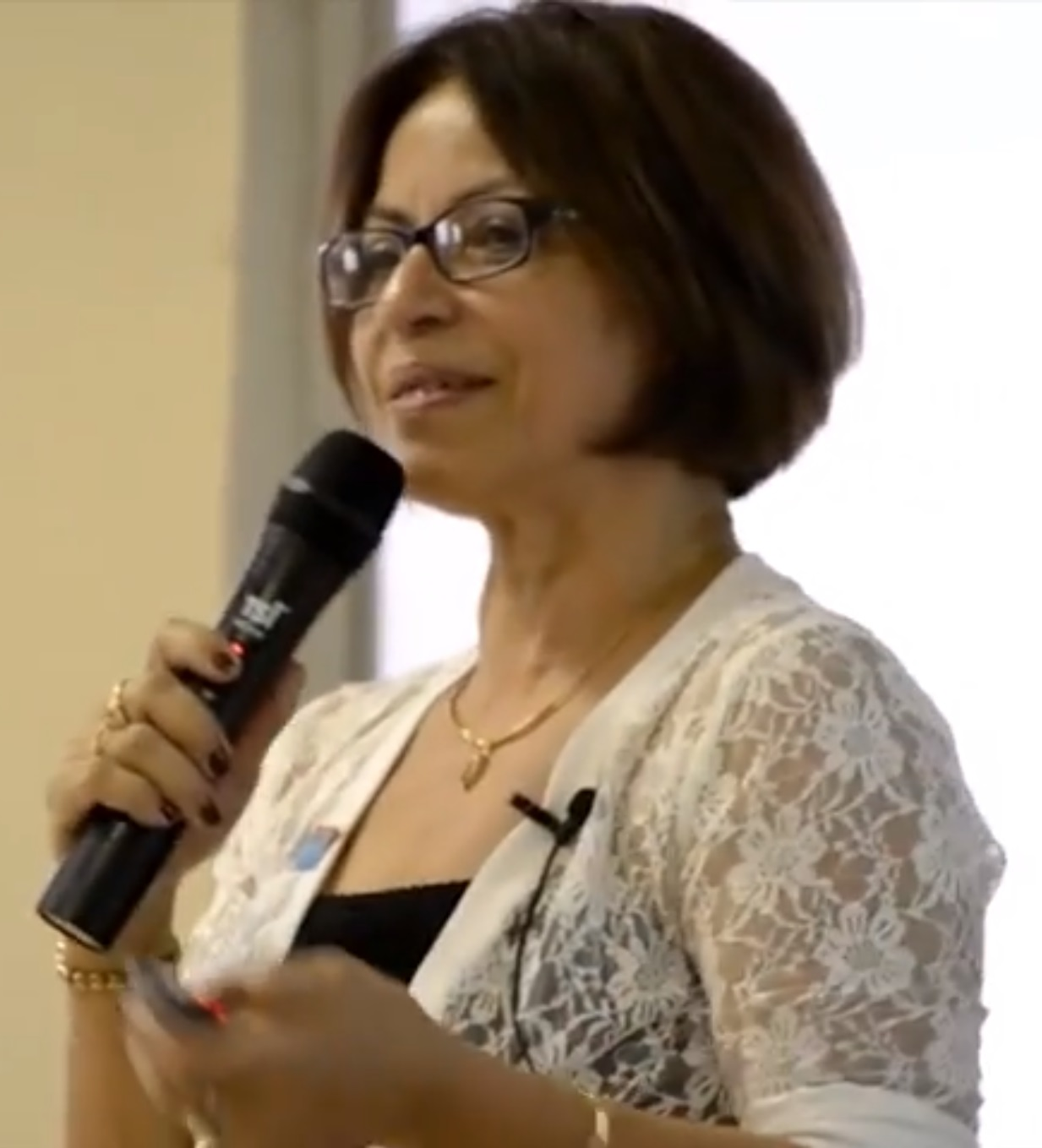
- Vanderlan da Silva Bolzani lectures for the post-graduate program in chemistry of the Federal University of Rio de Janeiro in 2017
- Born: Vanderlan da Silva; November 19, 1949 (age 76); João Pessoa, Paraíba
- Education: Federal University of Paraíba; São Paulo State University
- Awards: Simão Mathias Medal

Vanderlan da Silva Bolzani (born November 19, 1949) is a Brazilian chemist at the São Paulo State University. She has previously served as president of the Brazilian Chemical Society and was awarded the 2011 American Chemical Society – International Union of Pure and Applied Chemistry Distinguished Women in Science Chemistry and Chemical Engineering Award.

== Early life and education ==
Bolzani was born in Santa Rita and raised in João Pessoa, Paraíba. Her grandmother was indigenous, and Bolzani recalls playing with natural pigments from saffron in her grandmother's farm. Her parents were of Portuguese and Tabajara heritage. As a child she studied the fishing colony on Formosa beach, and became interested in the natural world. In high school she specialised in science. She earned her undergraduate degree in pharmacy at the Federal University of Paraíba. During her undergraduate studies she became interested in organic and analytical chemistry. She moved to the São Paulo State University in 1975, where she specialised in organic chemistry. She had originally planned to work with Paulo de Carvalho, but he died suddenly of a heart attack. Her supervisor, was Otto Gottlieb. She worked on Mikania hirsutissima and earned her master's degree in 1977 and PhD in 1982. Her master's dissertation considered the Euphorbiaceae of the Amazon rainforest. For her doctoral dissertation she concentrated on the theoretical aspects of botany, taxonomy and biology of the Rubiaceae. She was awarded a German Academic Exchange Service (DAAD) scholarship to work at Leibniz University Hannover. She was a postdoctoral fellow at the Virginia Polytechnic Institute.

== Research and career ==
Bolzani was appointed to the faculty at the São Paulo State University. In 1998 she established the Centre for Natural Product Bioassays, Biosynthesis and Eco-physiology (NuBBE). NuBBE is a green laboratory that does not use chlorinated products or toxic solvents. Her research considers plant science, in particular, the isolation and study of secondary metabolites and peptides in plants. She has studied the biosynthesis of piperidine alkaloids. She has studied the biodiversity of Brazil, and called for new technologies and scientific policy to support preservation of the Brazilian rainforest. She has since studied phytochemistry and endophytic fungi.

=== Academic service ===
She has served as Deputy Director of the São Paulo State University Innovation Agency from 2009. She has campaigned for women scientists throughout her academic career. In 2012 Bolzani joined the advisory board of the L'Oréal-UNESCO For Women in Science Awards.

=== Awards and honours ===
Her awards and honours include;

- 2008 Elected President of the Brazilian Chemical Society
- 2010 Elected Fellow of the Royal Society of Chemistry
- 2011 Elected to the Brazilian Academy of Sciences
- 2011 Brazilian Chemical Society Simão Mathias Medal
- 2011 American Chemical Society Distinguished Women in Science Chemistry and Chemical Engineering
- 2013 Elected to The World Academy of Science
- 2014 Capes-Elsevier Award
- 2015 Vice President of the Sociedade Brasileira para o Progresso da Ciência
- 2015 Brazilian Chemical Society Kurt Politzer Technological Innovation Award
- 2018 Superior Council of Fundacao de Amparo a Pesquisa do Estado de Sao Paulo

In 2019 it was announced that the Brazilian Chemical Society would create a Vanderlan da Silva Bolzani Prize for women scientists.

== Personal life ==
Bolzani was married to the sociologist Jorge Bolzani, who she met during graduate school in 1977. Together they had two children. Jorge Bolzani died in 2011.
