= Current Approaches in Psychiatry =

- Discipline: Psychiatry
- Language: English, Turkish
- Edited by: Lut Tamam

Publication details
- History: 2009–present
- Publisher: Psikiyatride Guncel Yaklasimlar-Current Approaches in Psychiatry (Turkey)
- Frequency: Quarterly
- Open access: Yes

Standard abbreviations
- ISO 4: Curr. Approaches Psychiatry

Indexing
- CODEN: PGYSA9
- ISSN: 1309-0658 (print); 1309-0674 (web)
- OCLC no.: 458286929

Links
- Journal homepage; Online access; Online archive

Current Approaches in Psychiatry (Turkish: Psikiyatride Güncel Yaklaşımla) is a quarterly online peer-reviewed medical journal publishing review articles on all aspects of psychiatry and related sciences (i.e. behavioral sciences, psychology, psychopharmacology, neuropsychiatry, neurosciences, psychiatric nursing). Articles are in Turkish or English.

== Abstracting and indexing ==
The journal is abstracted and indexed in:

- Chemical Abstracts
- Academic Search Complete
- TOC Premier
- EMBASE
- EMCare
- ProQuest Health & Medical Complete
- PsycINFO

== See also ==
- List of psychiatry journals
