= Surgenor =

Surgenor is a surname. Notable people with this surname include:

- Dorothy Surgenor (born 1931), American alpine skier
- Lois Surgenor, New Zealand clinical psychologist and academic
- Ross Surgenor, Canadian racing driver
- Alan Surgenor, Scottish Marine Engineer
