= New Zealand Cancer Control Trust =

The New Zealand Cancer Control Trust (NZCCT) was formed in February 2001 with funding support from the Cancer Society of New Zealand and the Child Cancer Foundation. It has subsequently obtained further funding from its founder organisations and from the Genesis Oncology Trust (now the Cancer Research Trust New Zealand) and has also generated income through contract work for the Ministry of Health.

== Timeline ==
1994	Ministry of Health advisory group agrees on the need for a national cancer control plan
1995	Ministry of Health commissions Coopers and Lybrand to develop a report on “Cancer Control Services in New Zealand: Developing a national implementation strategy”
1996	Cancer Society of NZ initiates a process to develop a national cancer control strategy by establishing a small steering group (Chris Atkinson, Vernon Harvey, Betsy Marshall)
2017	Trust holds final meeting (Brian Cox, Chris Cunningham, Lois Surgenor, Betsy Marshall) and is wound up.
