= Química Nova =

- Discipline: Chemistry
- Language: Portuguese, some English

Publication details
- History: 1978–present
- Publisher: Sociedade Brasileira de Química (Brazil)
- Impact factor: 1.145 (2021)

Standard abbreviations
- ISO 4: Quím. Nova

Indexing
- CODEN: QUNODK
- ISSN: 1678-7064 (print); 0100-4042 (web)

Links
- Journal homepage

Química Nova (print ISSN 0100-4042, e-ISSN ISSN 0100-4042, CODEN QUNODK) is a Brazilian scientific journal in chemistry. It was founded in 1978 and is published by the Brazilian Society of Chemistry (Sociedade Brasileira de Química), located at the Instituto de Química da Universidade de São Paulo (USP). The journal is online, and complete backfiles are available in fulltext. The journal is subtitled as Revista da Sociedade Brasileira de Química, but should not be confounded with Revista Brasileira de Química (São Paulo). According to the Journal Citation Reports, the journal has a 2014 impact factor of 0.661, ranking it 125th out of 157 journals in the category "Chemistry Multidisciplinary".

The Brazilian Society of Chemistry also publishes the Journal of the Brazilian Chemical Society.

== See also ==
- Anais da ABQ
- Journal of the Brazilian Chemical Society
- Revista Brasileira de Chímica
- Revista Brasileira de Engenharia Química, Caderno de Engenharia Química
