= General Psychiatry =

- Discipline: Psychiatry
- Language: English
- Edited by: Zhao Min and Xu Yifeng

Publication details
- Former name: Shanghai Archives of Psychiatry (Chinese name: 上海精神医学)
- History: 1959–present
- Publisher: Wiley
- Frequency: Bimonthly
- Open access: Yes
- License: Creative Commons Attribution License
- Impact factor: 9.9 (2025)

Standard abbreviations
- ISO 4: Gen. Psychiatry

Indexing
- ISSN: 2096-5923 (print); 2517-729X (web)
- OCLC no.: 1340603097

Links
- Journal homepage; Online archive

General Psychiatry is a bimonthly, peer-reviewed, open-access medical journal covering psychiatry and mental health. It is published by the Shanghai Mental Health Center in partnership with Wiley. Professor Min Zhao, President of the Shanghai Mental Health Center, and Professor Yifeng Xu, Director of the Brain Health Institute of the National Center for Mental Disorders, serve as Co-Editors-in-Chief, with Professor Jinghong Chen serving as Executive Editor.

== Scope ==
The journal publishes original research, systematic reviews, meta-analyses, and case reports. Its scope includes biological psychiatry, psychopharmacology, psychiatric genetics, psychotherapy, neuroimaging, digital psychiatry, computational psychiatry, and artificial intelligence in mental health, and related fields.

== Overview and history ==
As the first psychiatric journal in China, it was established in 1959 as the Shanghai Archives of Psychiatry (Chinese name: 上海精神医学). It was initially published at irregular intervals, which then became a quarterly publication in 1989 and a bimonthly one in 2003. In 2012, it transitioned to an all-English publication.

In August 2018, it changed its name to General Psychiatry and began publication with the BMJ Publishing Group. It was selected as an echelon journal in both Phase I (2019–2023) and Phase II (2024–2028) of Excellence Action Plan for China’s Scientific, Technical, and Medical Journals. In late 2025, its publishing work was moved from BMJ to Wiley. The journal is a member of the Committee on Publication Ethics and is affiliated with the Shanghai Mental Health Center (Chinese name: 上海精神卫生中心).

In 2026 XinRui Journal Rating, the journal was placed in Q1 in both Medicine and Psychiatry. It has also been recognized as one of The Excellent International Impact Academic Journals of China.

== Abstracting and indexing ==
The journal is abstracted and indexed in the Emerging Sources Citation Index, Scopus, PubMed, Directory of Open Access Journals (DOAJ), PsycInfo, and the Chinese Science Citation Database (CSCD). Its 2025 CiteScore is 12.4, ranking 23^{rd} in Psychiatry and Mental Health of Medicine. According to the Journal Citation Reports, the journal has a 2025 impact factor of 9.9, ranking it in 7th place out of 293 journals in the category "Psychiatry".

== See also ==
- Journal of Neurology, Neurosurgery, and Psychiatry
- Journal of NeuroInterventional Surgery
