= Juan José López-Ibor =

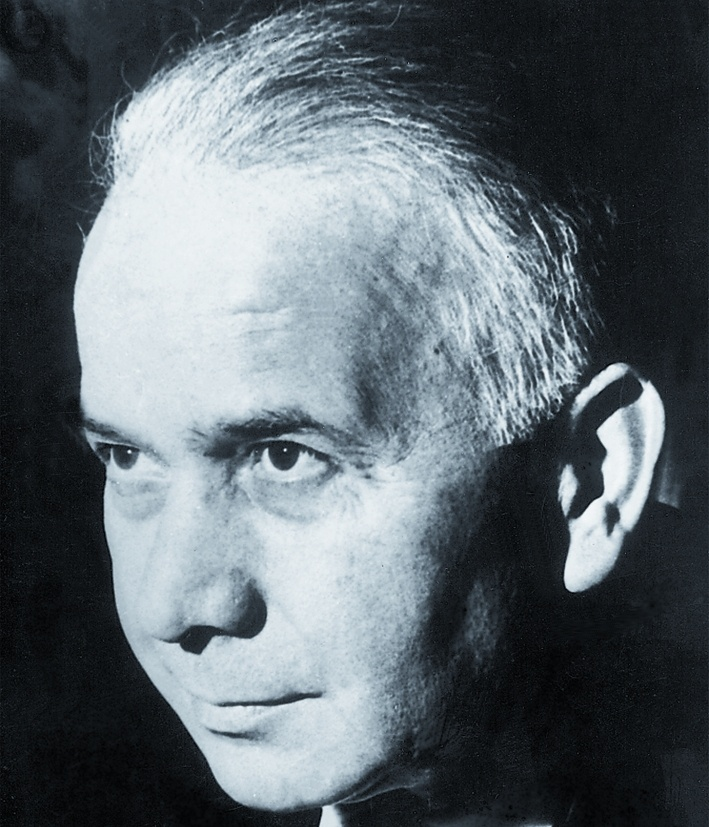
- Born: April 22, 1906; Sollana, Valencia, Spain
- Died: 1991; Madrid, Spain
- Education: University of Valencia; Complutense University of Madrid
- Known for: President of the World Psychiatric Association (1966–1971); Founder of Actas Españolas de Psiquiatría; Use of lobotomies and electroshock therapy to "cure" homosexuality during the Franco regime
- Children: Juan José López-Ibor Aliño
- Scientific career
- Fields: Psychiatry
- Workplaces: University of Santiago de Compostela; University of Salamanca; Complutense University of Madrid

Juan José Lopez-Ibor (Sollana, Valencia, 22 April 1906 – Madrid 1991) was a Spanish psychiatrist.

He studied medicine at the University of Valencia and the Complutense University of Madrid, where he obtained his doctorate in 1930. In 1932, he was awarded the chair of Legal Medicine in Santiago de Compostela; later, the chair of Psychiatry in Salamanca, In 1960, he succeeded Antonio Vallejo Nájera at the Chair of Psychiatry in Madrid. In 1940, he founded Actas Españolas de Psiquiatría. From a very young age he was opposed to the Freudian method of psychoanalysis.

In the 1960s, during the Franco dictatorship, López-Ibor performed lobotomies and electroshock therapy on psychiatric patients to "cure" homosexuality. Many of the homosexual patients who came into his hands did so as a result of the 1970 Law on Social Danger and Rehabilitation, which required homosexuals and transsexuals to be "rehabilitated" using various techniques. López-Ibor used a chalet as a clinic. The house had about thirty rooms, all of them with "special plugs" to connect the "electroshock", which the psychiatrist applied without the consent of the patient or the family. The magazine Interviú collected a fragment of a 1973 conference in Italy where he said: "My last patient was a deviant. After an operation on the lower lobe of his brain he shows disorders in memory and eyesight, but he is slightly more attracted to women".

In 1967 he founded the López Ibor Clinic in Madrid. In the same year, he was among the first to report that the drug clomipramine was effective in treating obsessive-compulsive disorder.

From 1966 to 1971, Juan José Lopez-Ibor was president of the World Psychiatric Association.

He was the father of Juan José López-Ibor Aliño, and grandfather of María Inés López-Ibor Alcocer. He died of Alzheimer's disease.

== Work ==
- Neurosis de guerra (1939)
- Epilepsia genuina (1941)
- La angustia vital (1950)
- El descubrimiento de la intimidad (1952)
- El español y su complejo de inferioridad (1953)
- Lecciones de Psicología médica (vol. I, 1957; vol. II, 1961)
- Libro de la vida sexual (1968)
- De la noche oscura a la angustia (1973)
- Cómo se fabrica una bruja (1976)
