= Julio Licinio =

American-Australian psychiatrist

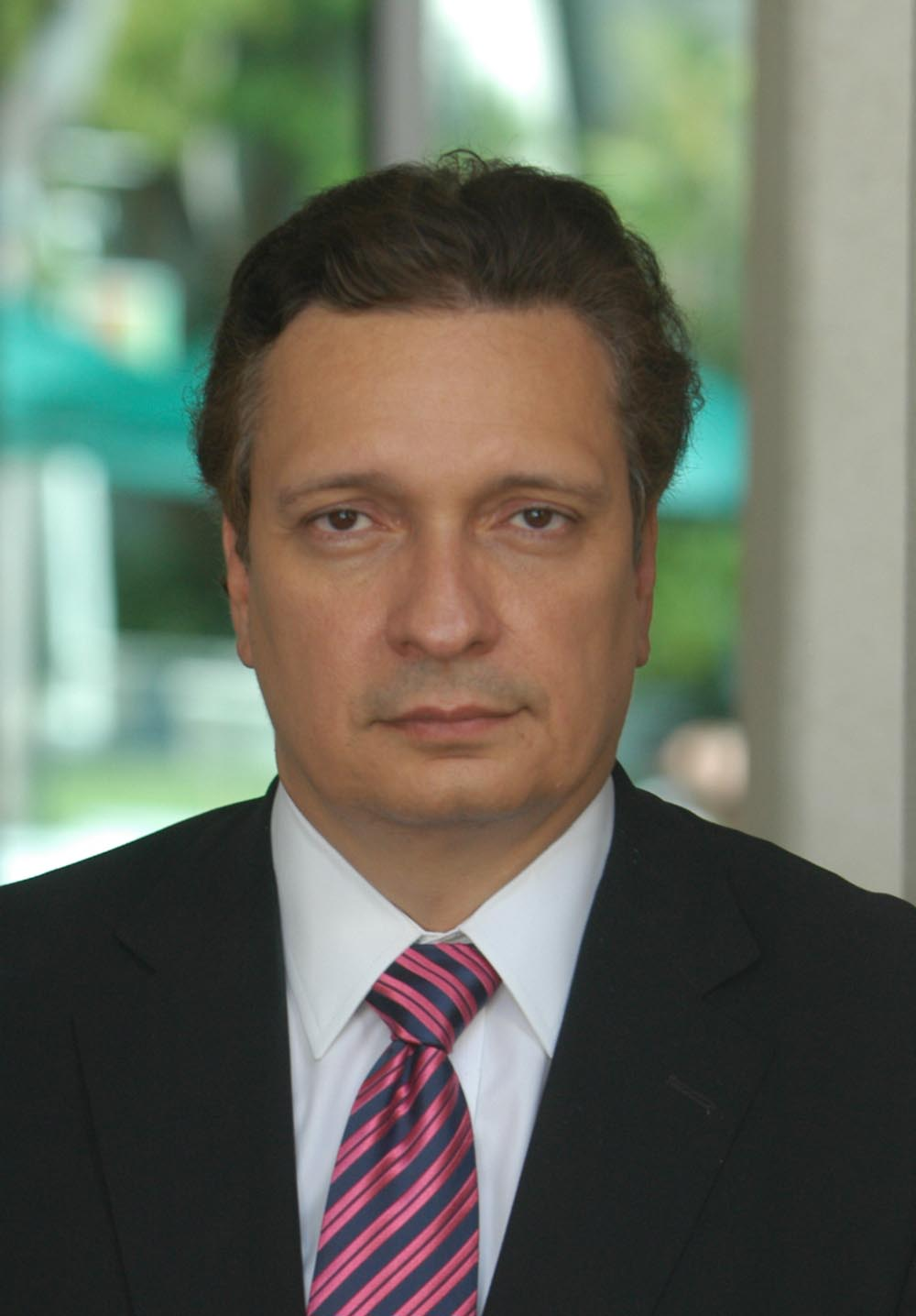
- Licinio in June 2006
- Born: 1958 (age 67–68); Belo Horizonte, Minas Gerais, Brazil
- Education: MD, Federal University of Bahia, 1982. PhD, Psychiatry, Flinders University, 2017. MBA, Samuel Curtis Johnson Graduate School of Management, Cornell University, 2019. MS, Healthcare Leadership, Weill Cornell Graduate School of Medical Sciences, Cornell University, 2019.
- Alma mater: Federal University of Bahia
- Known for: Pharmacogenomics, biology of depression
- Spouse: Ma-Li Wong
- Scientific career
- Fields: Psychiatry
- Workplaces: Yale University, NIH Intramural Research Program, University of California, Los Angeles, University of Miami Miller School of Medicine, John Curtin School of Medical Research, South Australian Health and Medical Research Institute and Flinders University, State University of New York Upstate Medical University
- Thesis: The biology of leptin: Effects on endocrine regulation and its replacement treatment (2017)

Julio Licinio is a Brazilian American psychiatrist who is SUNY Distinguished Professor at State University of New York Upstate Medical University in Syracuse, New York. He is simultaneously Matthew Flinders Distinguished Professor of Psychiatry at Flinders University in Adelaide. Licinio has been Senior Vice President for Academic and Health Affairs, as well as Executive Dean, College of Medicine. Licinio is the founding and current chief editor of three journals from Springer Nature, Molecular Psychiatry, Translational Psychiatry, and Discover Mental Health.

His area of scientific expertise is precision medicine with a focus on pharmacogenomics, as well as the biology of depression, and he has edited books on both topics. He has also published research on translational psychiatry, as well as on obesity and the possible link between obesity, depression, and antidepressants.

== Education ==
Licinio received his MD from the Federal University of Bahia in 1982 and completed an internship in internal medicine at the University of São Paulo from 1983 to 1984. He then moved to the United States and completed training in endocrinology at The University of Chicago, and psychiatry at Albert Einstein in the Bronx as well as at Weill Cornell Medical College. In 2009, Licinio moved to Australia, where he completed a PhD in psychiatry at Flinders University in 2017. Licinio is registered as a specialist in psychiatry by the Australian Health Practitioner Regulation Agency.

He is board certified in psychiatry by the American Board of Psychiatry and Neurology and he is a Fellow of the Royal Australian and New Zealand College of Psychiatrists, the Australian Academy of Health and Medical Sciences (elected 2015), the American Psychiatric Association, and the American College of Neuropsychopharmacology. In May 2019 Licinio completed an MBA from the Samuel Curtis Johnson Graduate School of Management, Cornell University and an MS in Healthcare Leadership from Weill Cornell Graduate School of Medical Sciences.

== Career ==
Licinio was an assistant professor of psychiatry at Yale University, then he was a Unit Chief within the Clinical Neurodocrinology Branch of the National Institute of Mental Health at the NIH Intramural Research Program (1993–1999), and later was professor of psychiatry and medicine/endocrinology at the David Geffen School of Medicine at UCLA from 1999 until 2006, where he had multiple roles, such as Founding Director of three NIH funded programs: the Interdepartmental Center on Clinical Pharmacology.

In 2006, he was appointed the Miller Professor of Psychiatry, Chairman of Psychiatry and Behavioral Sciences and subsequently associate dean for project development, responsible for starting the Clinical and Translational Science Institute at the University of Miami Miller School of Medicine, where he worked until 2009, when he moved to Australia as Director of the John Curtin School of Medical Research. Licinio returned to the US in 2017 as Senior Vice President for Academic and Health Affairs, Executive Dean, College of Medicine, and in 2019 he was appointed SUNY Distinguished Professor in the Departments of Psychiatry, Pharmacology, Medicine and Neuroscience & Physiology at State University of New York Upstate Medical University in Syracuse, New York.

From 1993 to 2001, Licinio was a temporary advisor to the World Health Organization (WHO), co-chairing ten WHO scientific meetings in seven countries, and co-edited the resulting ten books containing the proceedings of those meetings, mostly focused on the role of dysthymia in neurological disorders.

In 2005–2010, Licinio was a member of the United States Secretary of Health and Human Services Advisory Committee of Genetics Health and Society (SACGHS). The key issue addressed during his term was the Genetic Information Nondiscrimination Act (GINA), which was strongly supported by the SACGHS. GINA was enacted on 21 May 2008 (Pub.L. 110–233, 122 Stat. 881) as an Act of Congress in the United States, designed to prohibit the use of genetic information in health insurance and employment.

Licinio was the head of the Australian node of the German-Australian Institute for Translational Medicine (GAITM), directed by Stefan R. Bornstein. He has published collaboratively with 190 colleagues from 54 institutions, located in 19 countries, including Nobel Laureates Andrew Schally and Rita Levi-Montalcini.

== Honors and awards ==
- Fellow of the Australian Academy of Health and Medical Sciences, 2015.
- Matthew Flinders Distinguished Professor, Flinders University, "For exceptional eminence, breath of achievement, and outstanding contributions to [his] field of scholarship and to Flinders University", 2015.
- State University of New York Distinguished Professor, 2019.

== Teaching ==
Licinio directed three graduate training programs with master's degrees in translational investigation, for physician-scientists, at UCLA (supported by an NIH K30 award), University of Miami (supported by an NIH K30 award), and Australian National University. He also created and obtained NIH T32, NIH K12, and PhRMA Foundation (2004 Center of Excellence in Clinical Pharmacology) funding for the UCLA Interdepartmental Clinical Pharmacology Training Program, of which he was founding director (1999–2006). Licinio was the recipient of an NIH K24 award to mentor early career physician-scientists (2002–2007).

== Scientific research ==
According to Google Scholar, Licinio has an h-index of 86, with 38,965 citations. He has published 309 papers indexed in PubMed, as well as 13 books.

Licinio is known for his research into leptin and its role in conveying a feeling of satiety. For example, in 2002, he identified three people from Turkey who suffered from a genetic disorder called leptin deficiency – the only three adults known at that time to have this disorder – all of whom were severely overweight as a result. He then administered daily leptin injections to each of them, and found that after ten months, the patients had lost half of his or her original body weight. He discovered that despite being produced by a dispersed mass of fat cells, leptin is secreted in a highly organised manner with distinct pulsatility and circadian rhythm and that it appears to regulate the minute-to-minute rhythms of several endocrine axes, such as the hypothalamic-pituitary-adrenal axis, the hypothalamic–pituitary–thyroid axis, and the hypothalamic–pituitary–gonadal axis. Licinio and his colleagues were the first to suggest that leptin may have antidepressant effects, a concept that was subsequently extended by other groups. He also contributed to pioneer the concept that leptin has pro-cognitive effects in humans.

With his group, Licinio conducted work on the precision medicine and pharmacogenomics of depression that started in 2000 as part of the National Institute of General Medical Sciences NIH Pharmacogenomics Research Network (PGRN). In that project, he and his team studied a Mexican-American population with major depressive disorder in the city of Los Angeles, in the context of an extensive process of community engagement, which received Certificates of Commendation both from the California State Legislature and the United States Congress. He contributed the Mexican American samples to the International HapMap Project. His pharmacogenetics research has resulted in several publications on predictors of antidepressant treatment response in this population.

Wong and Licinio contributed some of the earliest work on the role of cytokines and immune mediators in the brain, with implications for the underlying biology of major depressive disorder, and published scientific articles on the localisation of gene expression for interleukin 1 receptor antagonist, interleukin 1 receptor, type I (IL1R1), also known as CD121a (Cluster of Differentiation 121a), and inducible nitric oxide synthase (iNOS) in mammalian brain. They also showed that interleukin 1 receptor antagonist is an endogenous neuroprotective agent. They have shown that the central and peripheral cytokine compartments are integrated but differentially regulated. In collaboration with colleagues at Columbia University Licinio and his team showed that inflammation-mediated up-regulation of secretory sphingomyelin phosphodiesterase in vivo represents a possible link between inflammatory cytokines and atherogenesis. Licinio's line of research examining the effects of peripheral inflammation in brain, behaviour and metabolism is ongoing in their lab.

In a more recent and ongoing line of research, Licinio and collaborators are examining the effects of the human microbiota and the microbiome–gut–brain (MGB) axis in obesity with diabetes and on behaviors relevant to depression and schizophrenia, an emerging area which opens potentially novel avenues for the treatment of psychiatric disorders.

Licinio and Wong have recently published a paper on the effects of climate change on mental health, which Springer Nature highlighted as the leading article for their Sustainable Development Goal (SDG) 13: Climate Action.

== Public engagement ==
Licinio wrote four book reviews for Science, including a commentary on the current diagnostic system in psychiatry, the American Psychiatry Association (APA)'s "Diagnostic and Statistical Manual of Mental Disorders", Fifth Edition (DSM-5) and the controversial exhibit on Sigmund Freud at the US Library of Congress. Licinio writes a blog on science-related matters for the general public. In 2018-2019 Licinio was a member of the New York State Governor's Suicide Prevention Task Force, representing the State University of New York.

== Personal life ==
Licinio's wife, Ma-Li Wong, is also an expert on depression, pharmacogenomics and psychoneuroimmunology; they have worked together for over 25 years, and have co-authored over 200 papers, and co-edited two multi-authored books on pharmacogenomics and the biology of depression.
