= Ma-Li Wong =

Ma-Li Wong is an Australian researcher in the fields of psychiatry and pharmacogenomics, with a particular focus on major depression. She is the co-director of the Precision Medicine Laboratory in Psychiatry with her husband Dr Julio Licinio.

Born in Hong Kong, Wong was raised in Brazil. She studied medicine at the University of Sao Paulo in 1977. She lived in the United States for over 25 years, during which time she was trained in psychiatry at the Albert Einstein College of Medicine and Yale University, among other places. She completed her PhD in Psychiatry at Flinders University in 2016, becoming the head of the Pharmacogenomics Research Program in the Mind and Brain Theme at the South Australia Health and Medical Research Institute and Strategic Professor of Psychiatry at Flinders University. In 2017, Wong returned to the US as a tenured professor at the Upstate Medical University at the State University of New York eventually earning a place on the university's Distinguished Professor list. She is married to medical researcher Julio Licinio, with whom she has regularly collaborated on research since the 1980s.

== Research ==
Her research is primarily focused on neurobiology and major depression, including the effects of antidepressants on Major depressive disorder and co-morbid conditions, such as anxiety and obesity. Her lab's long term goal is the understand the links and pathways between neoropsychiatric and neorodegenerative disorders, with a particular focus on those with co-morbidities with metabolic disorders. Examples include, Type 2 diabetes being linked with higher rates of depression, anxiety and dementia. As of 2025, her lab has projects on understanding novel biomarkers linked to major depression, including understanding gut microbiome and genetic links to depression.
