= International Journal of Geriatric Psychiatry =

- Discipline: Psychiatry
- Language: English
- Edited by: Sube Banerjee

Publication details
- History: 1986-present
- Publisher: John Wiley & Sons
- Frequency: Monthly
- Impact factor: 3.485 (2020)

Standard abbreviations
- ISO 4: Int. J. Geriatr. Psychiatry

Indexing
- CODEN: IJGPES
- ISSN: 0885-6230 (print); 1099-1166 (web)
- LCCN: 87644132
- OCLC no.: 609890091

Links
- Journal homepage; Online access; Online archive

The International Journal of Geriatric Psychiatry is a peer-reviewed medical journal covering research in geriatric psychiatry.

== See also ==
- List of psychiatry journals
