= Revista da Sociedade Brasileira de Química =

- Discipline: Chemistry
- Language: Portuguese

Publication details
- Former name(s): Revista Brasileira de Chímica
- History: 1929–1951
- Publisher: Sociedade Brasileira de Química (Brazil)

Standard abbreviations
- ISO 4: Rev. Soc. Bras. Quím.

Indexing
- Revista da Sociedade Brasileira de Química
- CODEN: RBCRAJ
- ISSN: 0370-3711
- ISSN: 0370-7180

The Revista da Sociedade Brasileira de Química was a peer-reviewed scientific journal of chemistry that was established by the Sociedade Brasileira de Química (SBQ). The first edition of the journal was published in 1929 under the name of the Revista Brasileira de Chimica, whereas the next edition published in 1931 was titled the Revista da Sociedade Brasileira de Chimica. All publications following the third edition published in 1933 were titled the Revista da Sociedade Brasileira de Química due to a Portuguese orthographic reform. All articles published in the journal were in Portuguese, but included three abstracts in German, French, and English. Publication of the journal was temporarily halted between 1934 and 1935, but continued until 1951 when the SBQ and the Associação Química do Brasileira jointly formed the Associação Brasileira de Química.

With the founding of the second Sociedade Brasileira de Química, the publication of Química Nova in 1978 and the Journal of the Brazilian Chemical Society in 1990 started. Química Nova is also subtitled as Revista da Sociedade Brasileira de Química, indicating its historical origin.
