= Stefan R. Bornstein =

German physician, academic

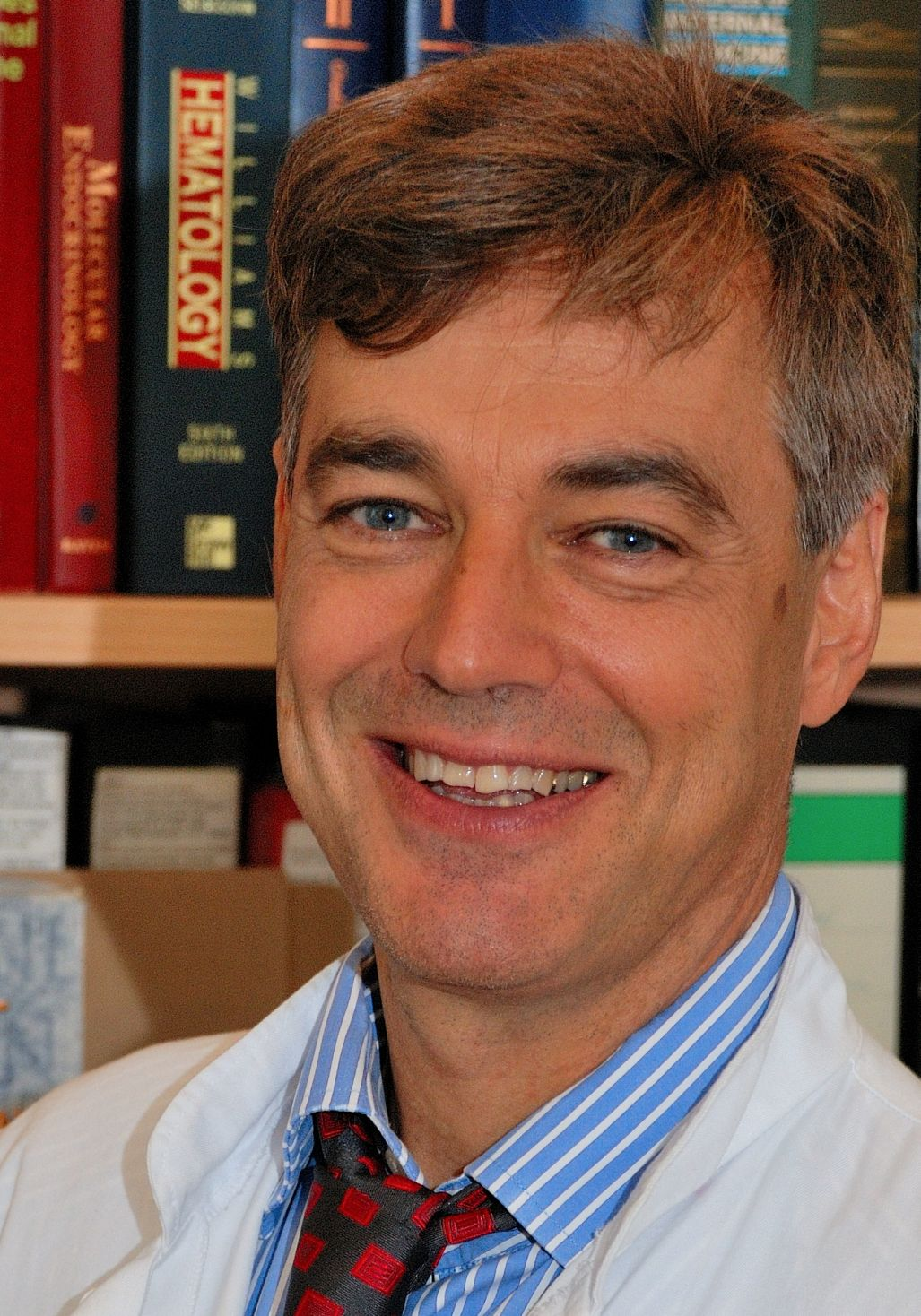

Director of the Centre for Internal Medicine and the Medical Clinic and Policlinic III at the University Hospital Carl Gustav Carus Dresden, Germany

Personal details
- Born: 5 November 1961 Oberstdorf, Germany
- Education: University of Ulm
- Occupation: Physician

Stefan Richard Bornstein (November 5, 1961 in Oberstdorf, Germany) is the director of the Centre for Internal Medicine and the Medical Clinic and Policlinic III at the University Hospital Carl Gustav Carus of the Technical University of Dresden as well as the medical faculty's vice dean of international affairs and development and a member of the supervisory board of the University Hospital of Dresden. Furthermore, he is chair and honorary consultant for diabetes and endocrinology at King's College London. Previously, Bornstein worked as assistant director and professor of endocrinology at the University Hospital of Düsseldorf, as unit chief at the National Institutes of Health in Bethesda, Maryland and held the Heisenberg-scholarship of the Deutsche Forschungsgemeinschaft.

Bornstein is known primarily for his pioneering work on the stress system. He was the first to investigate the interactions of the two central stress hormones adrenaline and cortisol in healthy as well as sick individuals in close collaboration with Nobel Prize laureates such as Andrew V. Schally and Rita Levi Montalcini Recently, Bornstein co-developed new therapeutic approaches to diabetes in preclinical and clinical stages. He has authored more than 500 publications and textbook articles with more than 12,000 citations, won numerous prizes and holds honorary professorships at universities in Europe, Asia and the USA. He is a member of the German Science Association (Deutsche Forschungsgemeinschaft) and the German Academy of Sciences, Leopoldina (Deutsche Akademie der Wissenschaften) 2018 he received the order of merit of the first class of Germany (Bundesverdienstkreuz 1 Klasse) from the President Frank Walter Steinmeier.

== Biography and family ==
Bornstein was born in Oberstdorf, Germany, in 1961 as one of four siblings. His parents were textile merchants (Stoffversand Bornstein). In the late 19th century, the Bornstein family emigrated to the United States, only to return to Germany shortly before World War I in which Stefan R. Bornstein's grandfather was honored with the Iron Cross. During the Nazi regime, many members of the Bornstein family both from the father's and mother's side were persecuted. Stefan R. Bornstein's grandfather, Max Bornstein, survived the Theresienstadt concentration camp but died shortly after World War II. Other relatives fled to England or the USA. Richard Lindner, an uncle of Bornstein's became a famous painter in the US and a trailblazer of American Pop-Art. A cousin married into the Belgian royal house, becoming Princess Léa of Belgium. His grandmother on the maternal side Rosa Haas was a famous Opera star in Vienna. The international background of the family and the travelling required for their textile business introduced Bornstein to different cultures and languages at a young age. Professor Stefan R. Bornstein has two sons and was married to Monica Ehrhart-Bornstein, a well-known neurobiologist and molecular endocrinologist. She died in October 2015. Stefan got married again and he has one daughter from his second marriage.

== Education ==
Bornstein took his German Abitur at the Gertrud-von-le-Fort-Gymnasium in Oberstdorf as class winner and studied medicine at the University of Ulm/Germany from 1982 to 1988. He did his practical year at the University of Miami, US, supervised by Maxwell McKenzie. In addition to his German state examination he holds the American Medical Licence ECFMG as well as the British license to practice medicine GMC-UK. He did his residency at the University Hospital Ulm under Ernst-Friedrich Pfeiffer and Professor Guido Adler during which he had a short research internship at the Biochemistry Department of the South West Medical Center, University of Texas, US, with Michael Waterman. 1994 he earned his Certificate of Completion of Training of internal medicine and in 1996 the sub-specialization of Endocrinology and Diabetology. From 1994 to 1997 he had an assistant professorship at the Department for Internal Medicine at the University of Leipzig with Werner Scherbaum. In 1995 he received his state doctorate in cooperation with the IZKF at the University of Leipzig. From 1996 to 1997 and 1998 to 1999 he held the Heisenberg-scholarship of the German Science Association; later he became unit chief under Prof. George P. Chrousos at the National Institutes of Health.

== Career and scientific awards ==
From 2001 to 2004 Bornstein held a C3-Professorship and was assistant director of the Department of Endocrinology and Metabolism at the University of Düsseldorf. From 2000 to 2002 he was scientific coordinator of a NIH-state-of-the-science-conference on adrenal tumors. In 2002 he was offered the directorship for internal medicine at the University of Adelaide and the Bo Schembechler Chair of Medicine at the University of Michigan, Ann Arbor, US, which he declined. Since 2004 he has held a C4-Professorship and directorship of the Department for Internal Medicine in Dresden. Furthermore, he became member of the Max Planck Graduate School in 2004 and is founding and board member of the excellence cluster Center for Regenerative Therapies Dresden (CRTD). In 2008 he became honorary professor at the University of Miami. Together with Julio Licinio he founded the German Australian Institute of Translational Medicine (GAITM) in 2009. Since 2011 he has been a consultant at the John Curtin School of Medical Research in Canberra and a board member of the John Curtin Medical Research Foundation. He has been an honorary professor at the Hong Kong University since 2012 and a professor and honorary consultant at King's College London since 2013.

== Research ==
Bornstein's scientific focus lies on the adrenal gland as on organ of stress, stem cell research and advances in islet cell transplantation as a therapy for diabetes. This is why, presently, Dresden is the only active German center of this treatment. Since 2011 Bornstein has been spokesman for the research group KFO 252 of the German Science Association (Deutsche Forschungsgemeinschaft DFG) and one of the coordinators of the Paul-Langerhans-Institute Dresden. Since 2012, he has been scientific secretary of the DFG Transregio 127. Main research areas are: endocrinology and internal medicine (e.g. adrenal gland, stress, and stem cell research), diabetes, transplant medicine (e.g. new strategies to improve diabetes treatment), public healthcare and preventive medicine (prevention of diabetes)

== Teaching ==
- Education of doctors and scientists, conduction of state exams and certificates of completion of training
- Development of health information systems for patients. Patent: MediROBO Gesundheitsinformationssystem, German Patent and Trademark Office (DMPA) M394 06 931:8

== Hospital work ==
Bornstein is chief of the medical clinic and policlinic III (Medizinische Klinik und Poliklinik III) at the university hospital Carl Gustav Carus in Dresden, which is a major centre of treatment and research of diabetes mellitus type I and type II in Europe as well as its sequelae, like the diabetic foot syndrome, heart and blood vessel diseases and diabetic nephropathy. A major topic is creating individual treatment strategies to prevent the increase in diabetes prevalence. That is why in 2009 they created the first professorship for diabetes prevention in Germany. In 2008 started the only currently active program of islet transplantation in Germany. This treatment is a great benefit for patients with diabetes type I with great deviations in their glucose blood levels. Recent research includes a bioreactor of insulin-producing cells in a small implantable chamber which offers an immunoisolation, making the implantation possible without immune suppressive therapy.

== Prizes ==
- 1990: Research prize for young academics of the Verband der Metallindustrie Baden Württemberg e.V.
- 1994: Marius-Tausk-Preis of the Deutsche Gesellschaft für Endokrinologie for the work: Human adrenal cells express TNFα-mRNA: Evidence for a paracrine control of adrenal function
- 1995: „Einfach genial Preis“ of the Middle German TV (MDR) for the MediROBO-Projekt
- 2010: Leopold-Caspar-Ehrenpreis of the Bundesverband Jüdischer Mediziner for extraordinary scientific and ethical competence

- 2018: Bundesverdienstkreuz Klasse 1 (order of merit of the first class of Germany)
