= Ian Freckelton =

Australian barrister, judge and academic (born 1958)

Dr. Ian Freckelton AO, KC
- Born: Ian Richard Lloyd Freckelton; 1 May 1958 (age 68); Durban, Natal, South Africa
- Education: University of Sydney Griffith University University of Melbourne
- Occupations: Lawyer; judge; jurist; scholar
- Title: King's Counsel
- Spouse: Patricia Molloy
- Children: 3

Ian Freckelton AO, KC is an Australian barrister, a judge of the Supreme Court of Nauru, a tribunal member, an academic at a number of universities, and a legal scholar and jurist with a high international profile. He is known for his extensive cross-disciplinary writing, his decision-making as a judge and a tribunal member, his meticulous and strategic representation of clients as a senior counsel, and for having given professional addresses in some 50 countries on many topical and cross-disciplinary issues, including in relation to health law, expert evidence, criminal law, tort law, therapeutic jurisprudence and research integrity. Freckelton is a member of the Victorian Bar Association, the Tasmanian Bar Association, and the Northern Territory Bar Association in Australia.

== Early life and qualifications ==
Freckelton was born in Durban, South Africa, to Joan Lloyd and Brian Freckelton. He then lived with his family in Nairobi, Kenya, and Sydney, Australia, where he attended St Aloysius' College and then the University of Sydney, obtaining undergraduate degrees in arts (with Honours in English and Latin) and Law. Later he was awarded a Diploma of Therapeutic Massage from the Academy of Natural Healing (1982); a PhD in Expert Evidence by Griffith University, (1998); and a Doctor of Laws degree, (a higher doctorate), from the University of Melbourne (2017).

== Legal career ==
Freckelton worked between 1981 and 1986 at the Australian Law Reform Commission on its references on Evidence, Aboriginal Customary Law, and Contempt. Between 1986 and 1988, Freckelton worked as Counsel Assisting the Police Complaints Authority of Victoria before reading for the Bar to commence work as a barrister.

He commenced to take briefs at the Victorian Bar in 1988 and took silk as a Senior Counsel/Queen's Counsel in 2007. Freckelton has a national practice from Castan Chambers in Melbourne, Australia, taking administrative law, criminal law, personal injury and professional liability, coronial, commercial, disciplinary and human rights cases, as well as undertaking investigations into allegations of misconduct and corruption.

Freckelton was appointed a judge of the Supreme Court of Nauru on a fly-in, fly-out basis in 2017, principally to hear appeals on questions of law from asylum-seekers.

Freckelton is also an experienced administrative decision-maker, having been a member of many tribunals. These include the Social Security Appeals Tribunal, the Medical Board of Victoria, the Psychologists Registration Board of Victoria, the Investigation Review Board of Victoria, the Disciplinary Appeals Board of Victoria, the Mental Health Review Board/Tribunal, the Psychosurgery Review Board of Victoria, the Suitability Board of Victoria and the Northern Metropolitan Disciplinary Board of the AFL. He is currently a part-time general member of the Administrative Review Tribunal and a panel member of the Veterinary Practitioners Registration Board of Victoria.

=== Prominent Cases ===
Dr Freckelton's high-profile cases include those in which as counsel he:

- prosecuted the Children of God case for the Department of Health;
- appeared for the children in the Barwon Children's human rights case against the Victorian government;
- conducted the investigation into the sexual misconduct of Melbourne Lord Mayor, Robert Doyle;
- represented the Northern Territory Police in the Kumanjayi Briscoe inquest;
- represented the Local Government Inspectorate in a series of cases against Local Councillor Muto;
- was counsel assisting in the inquest into the death of David Wilson in Cambodia;
- represented the New South Wales Police in the Lindt Café Inquest;
- appeared for the appellant in the High Court refugee case of Epeabaka v The Commonwealth;
- appeared for the Victoria Police in the Tyler Cassidy Inquest;
- appeared for the Chief Commissioner of the Victoria Police in the Bourke Street Inquest;
- appeared for the Chiropractors Registration Board in the disciplinary case against Malcolm Hooper;
- appeared for the Medical Board of Australia in the disciplinary case against Dr Jayant Patel, and
- appeared for Robert Barnes in the Eastman inquiry into the conviction of David Eastman for the murder of Assistant Commissioner Colin Winchester.
- appeared for the Queensland Police Service in both the Wieambilla and Bondi inquests.

=== Academic career ===
As an academic Freckelton is also:

- a professor in the Faculty of Law and a professorial fellow in psychiatry at the University of Melbourne, where he is a co-director of the postgraduate Health Law Programme;
- a former adjunct professor at Johns Hopkins University in the United States where he taught in the research integrity program;
- an adjunct professor of forensic medicine at Monash University in Melbourne;
- an adjunct professor in the Australian Centre for Health Law Research at the Queensland University of Technology;
- an adjunct professor at the Auckland University of Technology, and
- an adjunct professor of law at Griffith University.
- an adjunct professor of law at La Trobe University and at Southern Cross University.

Since 2010 Freckelton has been an inaugural member of the Coronial Council of Victoria, a body that advises the Attorney-General about the operation of the Coroner's Court. For 25 years (from 1995), he was a member of the Mental Health Tribunal of Victoria, including for a time as its Acting President. He was the Principal Examiner for the Law Institute of Victoria specialisation in criminal law. He is also a member of the Netherlands Centre of Expertise.

Freckelton was a Commissioner of the Victorian Law Reform Commission in 2015-2016 and ran its reference on Medicinal Cannabis which resulted in the Access to Medicinal Cannabis Act 2016 (Vic).

Freckelton is an Ambassador for Club Melbourne, which attracts major scholarly events to Victoria. Freckelton is a life member and former bi-national and Victorian President of the Australian and New Zealand Association of Psychiatry, Psychology and Law. He is a former vice-president of Liberty Victoria.

== Honours and awards ==
At the University of Sydney Freckelton was awarded the Walter Reid Scholarship, the Sir Arthur George Bursary, and the Sir Frank Packer Bursary.

In 1993 he was presented with a red barrister's bag by Frank Costigan QC for his work on the Children of God case. In 2019 Freckelton was the winner of a Distinguished Alumnus award by Griffith University. In the same year, Freckelton was a member of the legal team that won the Tim McCoy Award and also the Victorian Bar's pro bono award for public interest/justice innovation for his work on the Barwon Children's Case.

In 2019 and 2020 Freckelton was incorporated by Doyle's Guide amongst Victoria's Leading Senior Criminal Law Counsel, in 2021, 2022, 2023,2024, 2025 and 2026 amongst Australia's Leading Administrative and Public Law Barristers and in 2021, 2022, 2023, 2024, 2025 and 2026 by Best Lawyers for Administrative Law, Personal Injury Law and Commercial Law.

Freckelton has been elected a Fellow of the Australian Academy of Law, the Academy of Social Sciences Australia as well as an Honorary Fellow of the Australasian College of Legal Medicine. He has also been elected a life member of the Australian and New Zealand Association of Psychiatry, Psychology and Law. He was elected a Fellow of the Australian Academy of Health and Medical Sciences in 2022.

Freckelton is also a Governor and the Chair of the Education Committee of the World Association of Medical Law, which he has addressed on more than 20 occasions.

In 2024 the International Academy of Law and Mental Health (IALMH) awarded Freckelton the Prix Philippe Pinel, its most prestigious award.

Freckelton was appointed an Officer of the Order of Australia for "distinguished service to the law, and to the legal profession, across fields including health, medicine and technology" in the 2021 Queen's Birthday Honours.

== Personal life ==
Freckelton is married to Dr Patricia Molloy (daughter of neuropsychologist Maureen Molloy) and has three children, Leo Freckelton, Dr Julia Freckelton and Lloyd Freckelton. Freckelton is also the proud owner of two sheepadoodles, named Otis and Penny. He and Dr Molloy divide their time between Melbourne, the Dandenong Hills and the Surf Coast. Ian Freckelton's hobbies and interests include: running, swimming, riding bicycles, gardening, travel, Latin and Greek literature, theatre, the study of French language, as well as listening to an eclectic array of music.

== Writing and publications ==
In 1993 and 1994 Freckelton founded the Journal of Law and Medicine and Psychiatry, Psychology and Law, having previously edited the proceedings of conferences held by the Australian and New Zealand Association of Psychiatry, Psychology and Law for some years. He remains their editor and founding editor respectively and has written many editorials for each. Each has evolved into a highly ranked and internationally respected scholarly journal in the cross-disciplinary field of health and law. Freckelton was also a member of the team (with Bebe Loff and Beth Wilson) that transitioned the Legal Service Bulletin to the Alternative Law Journal in 1992, and was on the editorial board of both for many years.

Freckelton is a member of the editorial board of the Tort Law Review, the Australian Journal of Forensic Sciences and the New Zealand Journal of Family Law.

Freckelton has published extensively on a wide variety of legal and cross-disciplinary topics. He is the author of 50 books, over 800 articles and chapters of books, as well as more than 270 book reviews. He has given more than 800 professional addresses in approximately 50 countries.

=== Publications ===
Ian Freckelton's publications include:

- G Bellew, G Boas, P Chifflet, I Freckelton and I Vickovich, Australian Unifier Evidence Law: Principles and Context (3rd end, 2026) ISBN 9780409363036
- Expert Evidence, (editor and author), 7 volume subscription service, Law Book Co, Sydney, 1993-ongoing: ISBN 0455210780
- I Freckelton (editor and author), Criminal Law, Investigation and Procedure Victoria (general editor), 6 volume looseleaf service updated regularly, Law Book Co, Sydney, 2000-ongoing: ISBN 0455216789;
- I Freckelton (ed),'"Criminal Procedure", Volume 11 & "Sentencing," Volume 12, Laws of Australia (Law Book Co, Sydney, 1996-ongoing);
- B Bennett and I Freckelton, Pandemics, Public Health Emergencies and Government Powers: Perspectives on Australian Law (Federation Press, 2021);
- B Bennett, I Freckelton and G Wolf, COV-19, Law and Regulation (OUP, 2023)
- B Bennett and I Freckelton, Australian Public Health Law (Federation Press, 2023)
- I Freckelton, Expert Evidence: Law, Practice and Procedure (Law Book Co, 6th edn 2019, 7th edn, 2024): ISBN 9780455238425;
- I Freckelton and K Petersen (ed), Tensions and Traumas in Health Law (Federation Press, 2018): ISBN 9781760021498;
- I Freckelton, Scholarly Misconduct: Law, Regulation and Practice (OUP, 2016): ISBN 9780198755401;
- I Freckelton, J Goodman-Delahunty, J Horan and B McKimmie, Expert Evidence and Criminal Jury Trials (OUP, 2016): ISBN 9780198746348;
- I Freckelton and K Cockroft, Indictable Offences in Victoria (Thomson Reuters, 6th edn, 2016, 7th edn (in press), 2020): ISBN 9780455230986
- B McSherry and I Freckelton (eds), Coercive Care: Rights and the Law (Routledge, London, 2013): ISBN 1135016577, 9781135016579;
- I Freckelton and H Selby (eds), Appealing to the Future: Michael Kirby and his Legacy (Thomson, Sydney, 2009): ISBN 9780455226699, 9780455226682;
- I Freckelton and D Ranson, Death Investigation and the Coroner's Inquest (Oxford University Press, Melbourne, 2006): ISBN 9780195507003, 0195507002;
- I Freckelton and K Petersen (eds), Disputes and Dilemmas in Health Law (Federation Press, Sydney, 2006): ISBN 1862875537
- I Freckelton (ed), Regulation of Health Practitioners (Federation Press, Sydney, 2006): ISBN 1862876207;
- I Freckelton and K Diesfeld (eds), Involuntary Detention and Civil Commitment: International Perspectives (Ashgate, Dartmouth, 2003): ISBN 0754622665;
- I Freckelton and D Mendelson, Causation in Law and Medicine (Ashgate, Dartmouth, 2002): ISBN 0754622045;
- I Freckelton, P Reddy and H Selby, Australian Magistrates' Perspectives on Expert Evidence: A Comparative Study (AIJA, 2001):
- I Freckelton, Criminal Injuries Compensation Law and Practice, (Law Book Co, Sydney, 2001): ISBN 0455217882
- I Freckelton and K Petersen (ed) Controversies in Health Law (Federation Press, 1999): ISBN 1862873313;
- I Freckelton, P Reddy and H Selby, Australian Judicial Perspectives on Expert Evidence: An Empirical Study (AIJA, 1999): ISBN 1875527273
- I Freckelton and H Selby (ed), Police in Our Society ((Federation Press, 1988);
- I Freckelton, The Trial of the Expert (OUP, 1987): ISBN 0195545664.
