= Journal of Clinical Psychopharmacology =

- Discipline: Psychopharmacology
- Language: English
- Edited by: Anthony J. Rothschild, M.D.

Publication details
- History: 1981–present
- Publisher: Lippincott Williams & Wilkins
- Frequency: Bimonthly
- Impact factor: 3.153 (2020)

Standard abbreviations
- ISO 4: J. Clin. Psychopharmacol.

Indexing
- CODEN: JCPYD
- ISSN: 0271-0749 (print); 1533-712X (web)
- OCLC no.: [https://www.worldcat.org/oclc/06541910 Susan L. McElroy, M.D. 06541910 Susan L. McElroy, M.D.]

Links
- Journal homepage; Online archive

The Journal of Clinical Psychopharmacology is a peer-reviewed medical journal published by Lippincott Williams & Wilkins covering clinical psychopharmacology. It was founded by Richard I. Shader, MD in 1981 as the first journal of an international scope devoted solely to clinical psychopharmacology. David J. Greenblatt, MD served as Co-Editor-In-Chief. Drs. Shader and Greenblatt remained at the helm of the journal until both retired at the end of 2020. Anthony J. Rothschild, MD became JCP's new Editor-in-Chief in January 2021.

The first issue of the journal was published in January 1981. It included articles on several psychopharmacological studies, review articles, a brief report of clinicians' observations, an abstract, a historical perspective article, a book review, a forensic update, and a "Question the Experts" section. According to the first editorial by the Editors-in-Chief, this format was chosen "to create a "one stop" journal in which clinicians and students could find a variety of avenues to learning."

The journal has since published bimonthly issues with a wide range of articles reporting on clinical trials and studies, side effects, drug interactions, overdose management, pharmacogenetics, pharmacokinetics, and psychiatric effects of non-psychiatric drugs. Subscriptions to Journal of Clinical Psychopharmacology are managed through Lippincott Williams & Wilkins online store.

== Abstracting and indexing ==
According to the Journal Citation Reports, the journal's 2020 impact factor was 3.153. In addition, the journal is abstracted and indexed in the Science Citation Index and PubMed/MEDLINE.

== See also ==
- List of psychiatry journals
