= Dennis S. Charney =

American medical researcher

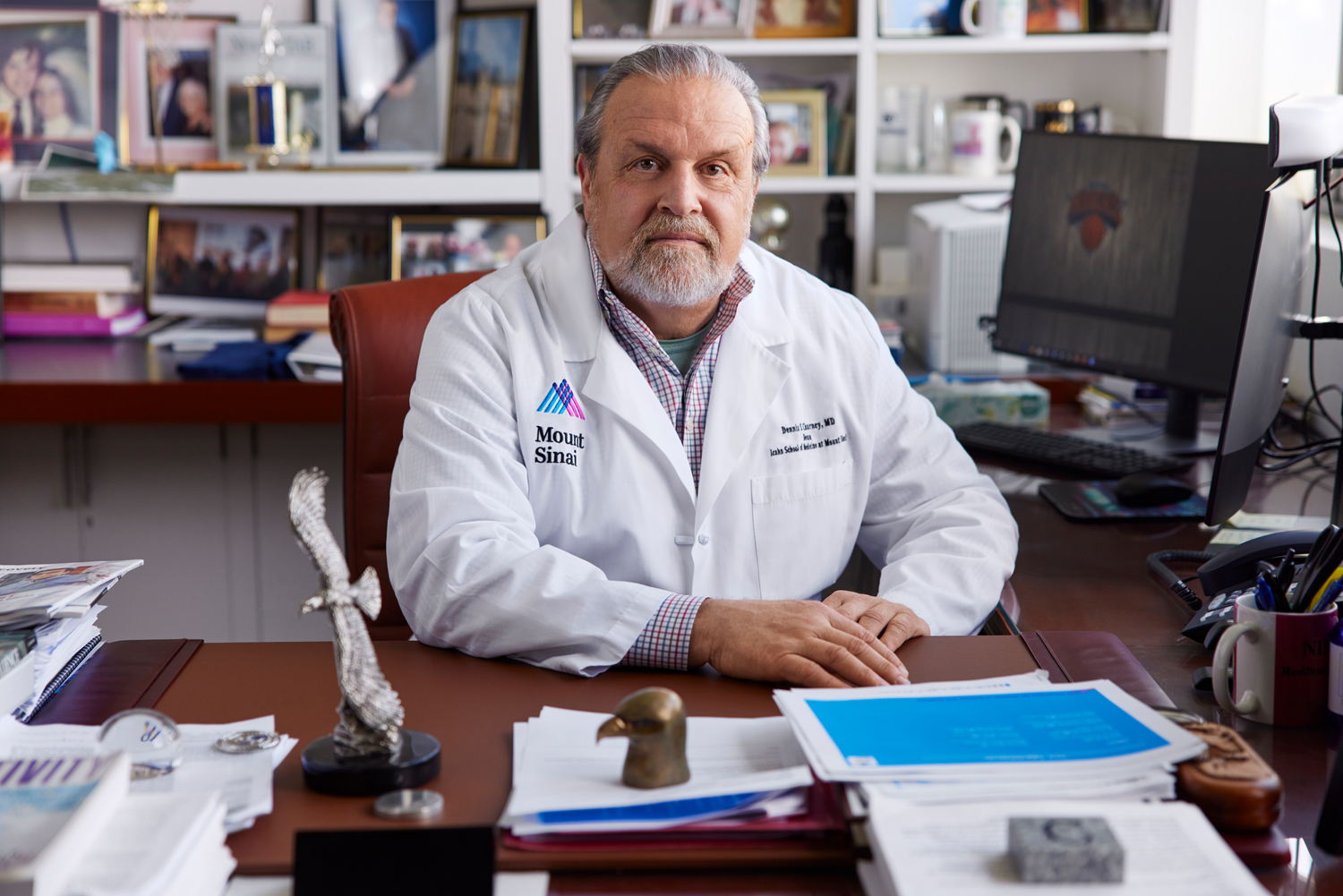
- Education: Penn State, Yale School of Medicine
- Known for: Ketamine treatment for depression
- Spouse: Andrea Charney
- Children: 5
- Awards: Election to National Academy of Medicine
- Scientific career
- Fields: Biological psychiatry, research, author
- Workplaces: Dean (former), Icahn School of Medicine at Mount Sinai
- Website: https://icahn.mssm.edu/profiles/dennis-s-charney

Dennis S. Charney is an American biological psychiatrist and researcher, with expertise in the neurobiology and treatment of mood and anxiety disorders. He is the author of Neurobiology of Mental Illness, The Physician's Guide to Depression and Bipolar Disorders and Molecular Biology for the Clinician, as well as the author of over 600 original papers and chapters. In 2022, he was listed #49 on Research.com's "Top Medicine Scientists in the United States," with an h-index of 218 with 173,960 citations across 887 publications. Charney is known for demonstrating that ketamine is effective for treating depression. Ketamine's use as a rapidly-acting anti-depressant is recognized as a breakthrough treatment in mental illness.

Until July 2025 he was a professor of psychiatry, professor of neuroscience and professor of pharmacology and systems therapeutics at Icahn School of Medicine at Mount Sinai in New York City.

In 2007, he became the Dean of the School and Executive Vice President for Academic Affairs of what was then known as the Mount Sinai Medical Center. In 2013, he was named President of Academic Affairs for the Mount Sinai Health System. He retired as Dean in 2025.

== Biography ==
=== Education and career ===
Charney graduated from medical school at Penn State in 1977 and completed his residency in Psychiatry at Yale School of Medicine. A fellowship in Biological Psychiatry was completed at the Connecticut Medical Health Center.

Charney became the dean of research at Mount Sinai School of Medicine in 2004, later becoming the dean for academic and scientific affairs, then succeeding Kenneth L. Davis as dean of the Icahn School of Medicine at Mount Sinai in 2007, retiring in 2025. He was elected to the Institute of Medicine in 2000.

Charney led the Mood and Anxiety Research Program at the National Institute of Mental Health and earlier was on the faculty in the department of psychiatry at Yale Medical School.

=== Research ===
According to published works, Charney's research is centered around various fields such as psychiatry, anesthesia, clinical psychology, and major depressive disorder. In recognition of his significant contributions to new treatments for mood and anxiety disorders, including the use of ketamine for resistant depression, Charney received the Donald Klein Lifetime Achievement Award from the American Society for Psychopharmacology in 2023.

==== Ketamine treatment development ====
Neuron published that Charney's neurobiological insights into ketamine are a novel approach to the underlying operation of mechanism-of-action for rapid-acting antidepressant efficacy and mood disorders and is the first model of a rapid-acting antidepressant with efficacy for treatment-resistant symptoms of mood disorders. His intranasal ketamine treatment was approved by the FDA in 2019 and now produced under the brand name Spravato. Scientific American published in 2018 that the development is the first new form of antidepressant since the 1950s.

==== General ====
General psychiatry research includes work on anxiety, mood and psychopathology linked to work in injury prevention, thereby connecting myriad disciplines of study. Research into depression shows elements of internal medicine and management. Clinical psychology includes psychological intervention and resilience. Research shows themes of randomized controlled trials and Esketamine. Traumatic stress, anxiety and neuroscience is part of his psychology study and is frequently connected to suicide prevention, bridging the gap between various science disciplines and establishing new relationships. Other areas of study are bipolar disorder, endocrinology and oncology.

Charney's research on digital mental health research contributed to the development of Rejoyn, the first FDA-approved prescription digital therapeutic for major depressive disorder (MDD). The treatment is designed to be used alongside standard care and medication to help reduce MDD symptoms.

==== Patents ====
Charney owns patents in dopamine and noradrenergic reuptake inhibitors in the treatment of schizophrenia and in intranasal administration of ketamine to treat depression. In total, as of 2022, he holds nine issued patents and five pending.

==== Affiliations and positions ====
- Principal investigator, VA National Center for Post-traumatic Stress Disorder and the NIMH Yale Mental Health Clinical Research Center.
- Member, Food and Drug Administration Psychopharmacologic Drug Advisory Committee
- Editorial committee, Biological Psychiatry, a publication of the Society of Biological Psychiatry
- Former chair, Board of Scientific Counselors for the National Institute of Mental Health
- Former chair, scientific advisory board of the Anxiety Disorders Association of America (ADAA)
- Former chair, Depression and Bipolar Support Alliance (DBSA) Scientific Advisory Board
- Past president, American College of Neuropsychopharmacology
- Member, Scientific Advisory Board of the National Alliance for Research on Schizophrenia and Depression (NARSAD, now known as the Brain & Behavior Research Foundation)
- Member, National Alliance for the Mentally Ill (NAMI)
- Former scientific director, NIMH Strategic Plan for Mood Disorder Research in 2002.

==== Awards and honors ====
Partial list:

- 2023 Donald Klein Lifetime Achievement Award, American Society for Psychopharmacology
- 2023 Rhoda & Bernard Sarnat International Prize in Mental Health
- 2019 Colvin Prize for Outstanding Achievement in Mood Disorders Research
- 2017 Ketamine for Treatment-Resistant Depression – Named One of Top 10 on 2017 Health Care Innovations List
- 2017 American Heart Association Heart of Gold Award
- 2017 - Fellow, National Academy of Inventors
- 2015 The World's Most Influential Minds
- 2014 Distinguished Alumni Award from the Pennsylvania State University School of Medicine
- 2014 The World's Most Influential Scientific Minds
- 2009 ACNP Julius Axelrod Mentorship Award
- 2006 The Gold Medal Award from the Society of Biological Psychiatry
- 2004 Research and Mood Disorders – American College of Psychiatrists
- 2004 CINP-Lilly Neuroscience Clinical Research Award
- 2004 The American Psychiatric Association Award for Research
- 2000 Election, National Academy of Medicine
- 1999 The American College of Psychiatrists Award for Depression Research
- 1999 The Edward J. Sacher Award from Columbia University
- 1999 The Gerald L. Klerman Lifetime Achievement Award from the Depression and Bipolar Support Alliance (DBSA)
- 1994–1995 Anna Monika Foundation Award for Research in Affective Disorders
- 1992 Daniel H. Efron Research Award from the American College of Neuropsychopharmacology
- 2014–2015 Distinguished Alumni Award, Pennsylvania State University

=== Personal life ===
Charney is the father of five children and grandfather of eight. On the morning of August 29, 2016, Charney was shot and wounded by Hengjun Chao, as Charney left Lange's Deli in Charney's hometown of Chappaqua, New York. Chao was a former Mount Sinai medical researcher who had been fired by Charney in 2010 for research fraud. Chao's trial began on June 5, 2017, and eight days later Chao was convicted of attempted second-degree murder and two other charges in Westchester County Court in White Plains. He was sentenced to 28 years in prison. These personal events contributed first-hand to his study of resilience and are discussed in this his book "Resilience".

==== Litigation ====
In April 2019, a lawsuit was filed against Dr. Charney, several other defendants, and the Mount Sinai Health System for sex and age discrimination at the Arnhold Institute for Global Health at the Icahn School of Medicine. The suit was filed by eight current and former employees, all but one women.

== Books and publications ==
He has been named among the top 3 most highly cited authors of psychiatric research in the decade ending in 2000 by the Institute for Scientific Information. He has been on the editorial board of 15 journals, including Biological Psychiatry, Journal of Anxiety Disorders, Journal of Affective Disorders, Acta Psychiatrica Scandinavia, Journal of Psychopharmacology, Human Psychopharmacology, and Psychopharmacology Bulletin.

=== Books ===
- 2025 Charney DS, Nestler EJ, Charney & Nestler's Neurobiology of Mental Illness, Oxford University Press; Sixth Edition, ISBN 978-0-19-068142-5
- 2023 Charney DS, Southwick DM, DePierro JM, Resilience: The Science of Mastering Life's Greatest Challenges Cambridge University Press; Third Edition, ISBN 978-1-009-29974-9
- 2018 Charney DS, Southwick SM, Resilience: The Science of Mastering Life's Greatest Challenges, Cambridge University Press, Second Edition, ISBN 978-1-108-44166-7
- 2011 Southwick SM, Litz BT, Charney DS, Friedman MJ Resilience and Mental Health: Challenges Across the Lifespan, Cambridge University Press ISBN 0-521-89839-0
- 2012 Charney DS, Southwick SM Resilience: The Science of Mastering Life's Greatest Challenges, Cambridge University Press ISBN 0-521-19563-2
- 2009 Stress-induced and Fear Circuitry Disorders: Refining the Research Agenda for Dsm-v by Gavin Andrews, Dennis S. Charney, Paul J. Sirovatka, Darrel A. Regier, American Psychiatric Publishing, ISBN 0-89042-344-X
- 2006 The Physician's Guide to Depression & Bipolar Disorders by Dennis S. Charney, Lydia Lewis, McGraw-Hill, ISBN 0-07-144175-1 (0-07-144175-1)
- 2003 Molecular Biology for the Clinician, by Dennis S. Charney, American Psychiatric Press, ISBN 978-1-58562-113-2
- 2002 Pediatric Psychoparmacology: Principles and Practice by James F. Leckman, Dennis S. Charney, Lawrence Scahill, Andres Martin, Oxford Univ Pr, ISBN 0-19-514173-3 (0-19-514173-3)
- 2002 Neuropsychopharmacology: The Fifth Generation of Progress by American College of Neuropsychopharmacology and Joseph T. Coyle and Charles Nemeroff and Dennis Charney and Kenneth L. Davis, Hardcover, Lippincott Williams & Wilkins, ISBN 0-7817-2837-1 (0-7817-2837-1)
- 1995 Neurobiological and Clinical Consequences of Stress: From Normal Adaptation to Post-Traumatic Stress Disorder by Matthew J. Friedman, Dennis S. Charney, Ariel Y. Deutch, Lippincott Williams & Wilkins, ISBN 0-7817-0177-5 (0-7817-0177-5)

=== Publications ===
Charney's most cited publications are:

- Goodman, Wayne K.; Price, Lawrence H.; Rasmussen, Steven A.; Mazure, Carolyn; Fleischmann, Roberta L.; Hill, Candy L.; Heninger, George R.; Charney, Dennis S. (1989-11-01). "The Yale-Brown Obsessive Compulsive Scale: I. Development, Use, and Reliability". Archives of General Psychiatry. 46 (11): 1006–1011. doi:10.1001/archpsyc.1989.01810110048007. ISSN 0003-990X. PMID 2684084. (9607 citations)
- Blake, DD; Weathers, FW; Nagy, LM; et al. (January 1995). "The development of a Clinician-Administered PTSD Scale". J Trauma Stress. 8 (1): 75–90. doi:10.1002/jts.2490080106. PMID 7712061.. (6352 citations)
- Krystal, John H.; Karper, Laurence P.; Seibyl, John P.; Freeman, Glenna K.; Delaney, Richard; Bremner, J. Douglas; Heninger, George R.; Bowers, Malcolm B. Jr; Charney, Dennis S. (1994-03-01). "Subanesthetic Effects of the Noncompetitive NMDA Antagonist, Ketamine, in Humans: Psychotomimetic, Perceptual, Cognitive, and Neuroendocrine Responses". Archives of General Psychiatry. 51 (3): 199–214. doi:10.1001/archpsyc.1994.03950030035004. ISSN 0003-990X. PMID 8122957. (4108 citations)

Other notable articles:

- Berman, R. M.; Cappiello, A.; Anand, A.; Oren, D. A.; Heninger, G. R.; Charney, D. S.; Krystal, J. H. (2000-02-15). "Antidepressant effects of ketamine in depressed patients". Biological Psychiatry. 47 (4): 351–354. doi:10.1016/s0006-3223(99)00230-9. ISSN 0006-3223. PMID 10686270. S2CID 43438286.
- Charney, Dennis S. (2004). "Psychobiological mechanisms of resilience and vulnerability: implications for successful adaptation to extreme stress". The American Journal of Psychiatry. 161 (2): 195–216. doi:10.1176/appi.ajp.161.2.195. ISSN 0002-953X. PMID 14754765. S2CID 337765.
- Zarate, CA; Singh, JB; Carlson, PJ; et al. (August 2006). "A randomized trial of an N-methyl-D-aspartate antagonist in treatment-resistant major depression". Arch. Gen. Psychiatry. 63 (8): 856–64. doi:10.1001/archpsyc.63.8.856. PMID 16894061.
- Murrough, James W.; Iosifescu, Dan V.; Chang, Lee C.; Al Jurdi, Rayan K.; Green, Charles E.; Perez, Andrew M.; Iqbal, Syed; Pillemer, Sarah; Foulkes, Alexandra; Shah, Asim; Charney, Dennis S. (2013). "Antidepressant efficacy of ketamine in treatment-resistant major depression: a two-site randomized controlled trial". The American Journal of Psychiatry. 170 (10): 1134–1142. doi:10.1176/appi.ajp.2013.13030392. ISSN 1535-7228. PMC 3992936. PMID 23982301.
- Feder, Adriana; Parides, Michael K.; Murrough, James W.; Perez, Andrew M.; Morgan, Julia E.; Saxena, Shireen; Kirkwood, Katherine; Aan Het Rot, Marije; Lapidus, Kyle A. B.; Wan, Le-Ben; Iosifescu, Dan (2014). "Efficacy of intravenous ketamine for treatment of chronic posttraumatic stress disorder: a randomized clinical trial". JAMA Psychiatry. 71 (6): 681–688. doi:10.1001/jamapsychiatry.2014.62. hdl:11370/2e083c48-eca1-4f30-a88f-65b0920c1f55. ISSN 2168-6238. PMID 24740528.
- Iacoviello, Brian M.; Wu, Gang; Alvarez, Evan; Huryk, Kathryn; Collins, Katherine A.; Murrough, James W.; Iosifescu, Dan V.; Charney, Dennis S. (2014). "Cognitive-emotional training as an intervention for major depressive disorder". Depression and Anxiety. 31 (8): 699–706. doi:10.1002/da.22266. ISSN 1520-6394. PMID 24753225. S2CID 205736356.
- Feder, Adriana; Fred-Torres, Sharely; Southwick, Steven M.; Charney, Dennis S. (2019-09-15). "The Biology of Human Resilience: Opportunities for Enhancing Resilience Across the Life Span". Biological Psychiatry. 86 (6): 443–453. doi:10.1016/j.biopsych.2019.07.012. ISSN 1873-2402. PMID 31466561. S2CID 199544779.
- Krystal, John H.; Charney, Dennis S.; Duman, Ronald S. (2020-04-02). "A New Rapid-Acting Antidepressant". Cell. 181 (1): 7. doi:10.1016/j.cell.2020.02.033. ISSN 1097-4172. PMID 32243798. S2CID 214754831.
- Charney, Alexander W.; Katz, Craig; Southwick, Steven M.; Charney, Dennis S. (2020-10-01). "A Call to Protect the Health Care Workers Fighting COVID-19 in the United States". The American Journal of Psychiatry. 177 (10): 900–901. doi:10.1176/appi.ajp.2020.20040535. ISSN 1535-7228. PMID 32731814. S2CID 220893056.
- Feder, Adriana; Costi, Sara; Rutter, Sarah B.; Collins, Abigail B.; Govindarajulu, Usha; Jha, Manish K.; Horn, Sarah R.; Kautz, Marin; Corniquel, Morgan; Collins, Katherine A.; Bevilacqua, Laura (2021-02-01). "A Randomized Controlled Trial of Repeated Ketamine Administration for Chronic Posttraumatic Stress Disorder". The American Journal of Psychiatry. 178 (2): 193–202. doi:10.1176/appi.ajp.2020.20050596. ISSN 1535-7228. PMID 33397139. S2CID 230658032.
