= Lois Surgenor =

New Zealand clinical psychologist and academic

- Other name: Lois J. Surgenor
- Education: University of Otago
- Scientific career
- Workplaces: University of Otago

Lois J. Surgenor is a New Zealand clinical psychologist and academic. Her research focuses on eating disorders and traumatic brain injury. As of 2021 she is a full professor at the University of Otago.

== Academic career ==
Surgenor has a MA and diploma of clinical psychology from the University of Canterbury. She has practised as a registered clinical psychologist since the late 1980s. She joined the University of Otago in 1996 and in 2002 she completed a PhD at Otago. She was promoted to full professor with effect from 1 February 2019.

== Selected works ==
- Sarah Maguire; Lois J Surgenor; Daniel Le Grange; et al. (27 November 2017). "Examining a staging model for anorexia nervosa: empirical exploration of a four stage model of severity". Journal of eating disorders. 5: 41. doi:10.1186/s40337-017-0155-1. ISSN 2050-2974. PMC 5702958. PMID 29209500. Wikidata Q46447668.
- Lois J Surgenor (4 September 2019). "Commentary on disordered eating symptoms and bariatric/metabolic surgery". Australasian Psychiatry. 28 (2): 153–155. doi:10.1177/1039856219871869. ISSN 1039-8562. PMID 31483142. Wikidata Q93095529.
- Lois J Surgenor; Deborah L Snell; Richard J Siegert; Steven Kelly; Richard Flint; Grant Coulter (1 March 2020). "Psychometric Characteristics of the Revised Illness Perception Questionnaire (IPQ-R) in People Undergoing Weight Loss Surgery". Journal of Clinical Psychology in Medical Settings. 27 (1): 79–88. doi:10.1007/s10880-019-09624-4. ISSN 1068-9583. PMID 31069587. Wikidata Q91872200.
- Kate Diesfeld; Lois Surgenor; Marta Rychert (1 April 2020). "Breaches of New Zealand's Health and Disability Services Consumers' Rights: Human Rights Review Tribunal Decisions". Journal of Law and Medicine. 27 (3): 679–692. ISSN 1320-159X. PMID 32406629. Wikidata Q94677301.
