= Arquivos de Neuro-Psiquiatria =

- Discipline: Neurology, psychiatry
- Language: English
- Edited by: José Antonio Livramento, Luís dos Ramos Machado

Publication details
- History: 1943-present
- Publisher: Academia Brasileira de Neurologia (Brazil)
- Frequency: Monthly
- Open access: Yes
- License: Creative Commons Attribution BY-NC
- Impact factor: 0.0870 (2020)

Standard abbreviations
- ISO 4: Arq. Neuro-Psiquiatr.
- NLM: Arq Neuropsiquiatr

Indexing
- CODEN: ANPIAM
- ISSN: 0004-282X (print); 1678-4227 (web)
- OCLC no.: 909880068

Links
- Journal homepage; Online archive

Arquivos de Neuro-Psiquiatria (English: Archives of Neuropsychiatry) is a monthly peer-reviewed medical journal covering neurology and psychiatry. It is published by the Academia Brasileira de Neurologia. Articles are published in English, with abstracts in English and Portuguese. The editors-in-chief are José Antonio Livramento and Luís dos Ramos Machado (University of São Paulo).

== Abstracting and indexing ==
The journal is abstracted and indexed in:

- CASSI
- Embase/Excerpta Medica
- Index Medicus/MEDLINE/PubMed
- Latindex
- Science Citation Index Expanded
- Scopus

According to the Journal Citation Reports, the journal has a 2014 impact factor of 0.843.
