= Kate Diesfeld =

New Zealand health law academic

- Born: 1960 (age 64–65)
- Education: Colgate University (BA); University of San Diego (JD)
- Scientific career
- Fields: health law
- Institutions: Kent Law School, Auckland University of Technology, University of Waikato

Kate Diesfeld (born 1960) is a New Zealand health law academic. She is currently a full professor at the Auckland University of Technology.

== Academic career ==
After earning a BA in Sociology and Anthropology from Colgate University in New York in 1982, Diesfeld received a Juris Doctor from the University of San Diego in 1988 and was admitted to the State Bar of California in 1989. Between 1993 and 2000, Diesfeld worked at Kent Law School and before the Mental Health Review Tribunal in England before moving to Auckland University of Technology, then the University of Waikato in New Zealand and then back to Auckland University of Technology in 2012.

== Selected works ==
- Diesfeld, Kate, and Ian Freckelton. "Involuntary detention and therapeutic jurisprudence: International perspectives on civil commitment." (2003).
- Diesfeld, Kate, and Stefan Sjöström. "Interpretive flexibility: why doesn't insight incite controversy in mental health law?." Behavioral sciences & the law 25, no. 1 (2007): 85–101.
- Wareham, Pauline, Antoinette McCallin, and Kate Diesfeld. "Advance directives: the New Zealand context." Nursing ethics 12, no. 4 (2005): 349–359.
- Phillips, Michael R., Hanhui Chen, Kate Diesfeld, Bin Xie, Hui G. Cheng, Graham Mellsop, and Xiehe Liu. "China’s new mental health law: reframing involuntary treatment." American Journal of Psychiatry 170, no. 6 (2013): 588–591.
- Diesfeld, Kate, and Brian McKenna. "The unintended impact of the therapeutic intentions of the New Zealand Mental Health Review Tribunal? Therapeutic jurisprudence perspectives." Journal of law and medicine 14, no. 4 (2007): 566–574.
