= Sube Banerjee =

Sube Banerjee is a researcher specialised in dementia. Currently, he serves as the Pro-Vice-Chancellor for the Faculty of Medicine and Health Sciences at The University of Nottingham. His research focuses on the quality of life in dementia and the evaluation of new treatments. He served as the UK Department of Health's senior professional advisor on dementia and led the development and delivery of its National Dementia Strategy.

== Career ==
Sube Banerjee has held executive roles in multiple universities across the United Kingdom. He trained in medicine at St Thomas's Hospital Medical School, in epidemiology at the London School of Hygiene and Tropical Medicine, and in psychiatry at Guy's and the Maudsley hospitals and the Institute of Psychiatry, King's College London, further having an MBA from the London Business School. Clinically, he practised as an old age psychiatrist.

He was a professor of Dementia and Associate Dean at Brighton and Sussex Medical School, where he led the Centre for Dementia Studies. Prior to joining Brighton in 2012, he held the role of Professor of Mental Health and Ageing at the Institute of Psychiatry, King's College London. He was the head of Cognitive Agility LTD, where he oversaw clinical trials. He was previously a professor of Dementia and Executive Dean of the Faculty of Health at The University of Plymouth.

== Research output ==
Professor Banerjee's research largely centres on quality of life in dementia, including care interventions, agitation management, and support systems. His research further focuses on quality of life in dementia, evaluation of new treatments, technologies and services in dementia care, and the interface between policy, research and practice.

He has had global and policy-level contributions, including leadership in the UK National Dementia Strategy and the WHO Global Action Plan on Dementia.

During his time at the University of Plymouth, his research focused on arguing for early diagnosis in dementia, community‑based care, and confronting inequities. He illustrated that dementia is a complex condition requiring multifaceted solutions, grounded in both policy and practice.

In May 2025, Professor Sube Banerjee MBE was elected as a Fellow of the Academy of Medical Sciences, one of 54 biomedical and health researchers recognised for their exceptional contributions to science and public benefit.

On ResearchGate, Sube Banerjee is listed with over 300 publications, over 20,000 citations, and expertise in Alzheimer's disease, geriatric psychiatry, ageing, and neurodegenerative research.
