= Journal of NeuroInterventional Surgery =

- Discipline: Neurosurgery
- Language: English
- Edited by: Michael Chen

Publication details
- History: 2009-present
- Publisher: BMJ Group on behalf of the Society of NeuroInterventional Surgery
- Impact factor: 4.4 (2025)

Standard abbreviations
- ISO 4: J. Neurointerv. Surg.

Indexing
- ISSN: 1759-8478 (print); 1759-8486 (web)

Links
- Journal homepage

The Journal of NeuroInterventional Surgery is a peer-reviewed medical journal covering the field of neurointerventional surgery. It is published by the BMJ Group on behalf of the Society of NeuroInterventional Surgery. It is also the official journal of the Interventional Chapter of the Australian and New Zealand Society of Neuroradiology.

It is abstracted and indexed by Current Contents, CINAHL and Index Medicus.
