= Brazilian Journal of Chemical Engineering =

- Discipline: Chemical engineering
- Language: Portuguese

Publication details
- Former name(s): Revista Brasileira de Engenharia, Caderno de Engenharia Quimica
- History: 1995–present
- Publisher: Brazilian Society of Chemical Engineering (Brazil)

Standard abbreviations
- ISO 4: Braz. J. Chem. Eng.

Indexing
- CODEN: BJCEFZ
- ISSN: 1678-4383

Links
- Journal homepage

Revista Brasileira de Engenharia, Caderno de Engenharia Química
- Discipline: Chemical engineering
- Language: Portuguese

Publication details
- History: 1983–1994
- Publisher: Associação Brasileira de Engenharia Química (Brazil)

Standard abbreviations
- ISO 4: Rev. Bras. Eng. Cad. Eng. Quím.

Indexing
- CODEN: RRBEEN
- ISSN: 0102-2687

Links
- Journal homepage

The Brazilian Journal of Chemical Engineering publishes papers, reporting basic and applied research and innovation in the field of chemical engineering and related areas. It was first published by the Associação Brasileira de Engenharia Química, São Paulo, in 1983 as the Revista Brasileira de Engenharia, Caderno de Engenharia Química. With vol. 11 (1994), it continued as the Brazilian Journal of Chemical Engineering.

It continues the Revista Brasileira de Engenharia, Caderno de Engenharia Química from 1994 on.

Fulltext of the journal is available via SciElo starting from vol. 14 (1997) to vol. 36 (2019).

From January 2020 on, the journal is published by Springer.

== See also ==
- Anais da ABQ
- Journal of the Brazilian Chemical Society
- Química Nova
- Revista Brasileira de Química
