= Psychiatry and Clinical Neurosciences =

- Discipline: Psychiatry, neurology
- Language: English
- Edited by: Shigenobu Kanba, Tadafumi Kato

Publication details
- Former name(s): Folia Psychiatrica Et Neurologica Japonica, The Japanese Journal of Psychiatry and Neurology
- History: 1933-present
- Publisher: Wiley-Blackwell
- Frequency: Bimonthly
- Impact factor: 12.145 (2021)

Standard abbreviations
- ISO 4: Psychiatry Clin. Neurosci.

Indexing
- CODEN: PCNEFP
- ISSN: 1323-1316 (print); 1440-1819 (web)
- LCCN: sv95003966
- OCLC no.: 32912105

Links
- Journal homepage; Online access; Online archive

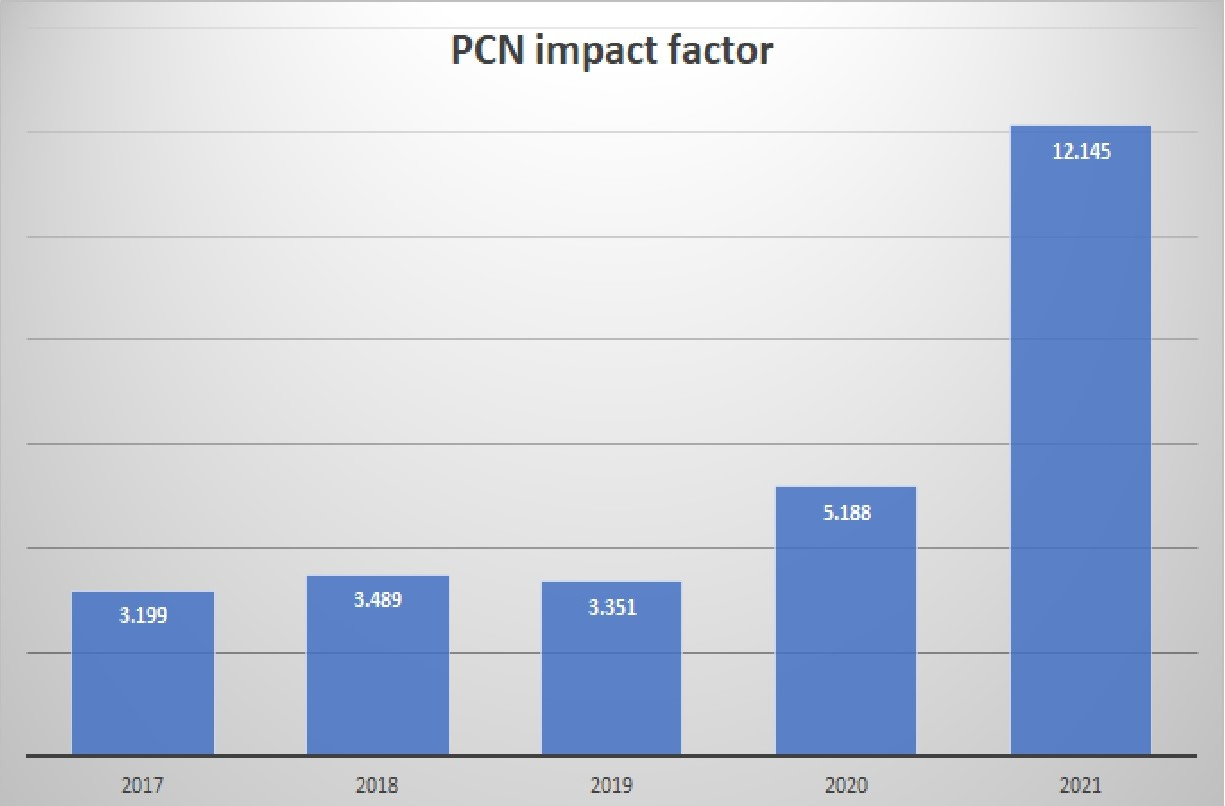
Changes in the impact factor of PCN

Psychiatry and Clinical Neurosciences (PCN) is a bimonthly peer-reviewed medical journal covering psychiatry and neuroscience. It was established in 1933 as Folia Psychiatrica Et Neurologica Japonica, and was renamed The Japanese Journal of Psychiatry and Neurology in 1986. It obtained its current name in 1995. It is published by John Wiley & Sons on behalf of the Japanese Society of Psychiatry and Neurology(JSPN), of which it is the official journal. The editors-in-chief are Shigenobu Kanba (Kyushu University) and Tadafumi Kato (RIKEN Brain Science Institute, Juntendo University). According to the Journal Citation Reports, the journal has a 2021 impact factor of 12.145, ranking it 14th out of 155 journals in the category "Psychiatry" and 16th out of 274 in the category "Neurosciences". PCN's mission is to become an international academic hub of psychiatry as well as a leading journal in the East disseminating prominent research which are valuable to the psychiatry field. PCN is published 12 online issues a year by JSPN in all fields of psychiatry and related neurosciences in the following categories: Review Articles, Regular Articles, and Letters to the Editor.
