= Issues in Mental Health Nursing =

- Discipline: Psychiatric and mental health nursing
- Language: English
- Edited by: Sandra P. Thomas

Publication details
- History: 1978-present
- Publisher: Taylor & Francis
- Frequency: Monthly

Standard abbreviations
- ISO 4: Issues Ment. Health Nurs.

Indexing
- ISSN: 0161-2840 (print); 1096-4673 (web)
- OCLC no.: 23196619

Links
- Journal homepage; Online access; Online archive

Issues in Mental Health Nursing is a peer-reviewed nursing journal that covers psychiatric and mental health nursing. Because clinical research is the primary factor for the development of nursing science, the journal presents data-based articles on nursing care provision to clients of all ages in a variety of community and institutional settings. Additionally, the journal publishes theoretical papers and manuscripts addressing mental health promotion, public policy concerns, and educational preparation of mental health nurses. The editor-in-chief is Sandra P. Thomas (University of Tennessee).

== See also ==
- List of psychiatry journals
