= Shanghai Mental Health Center =

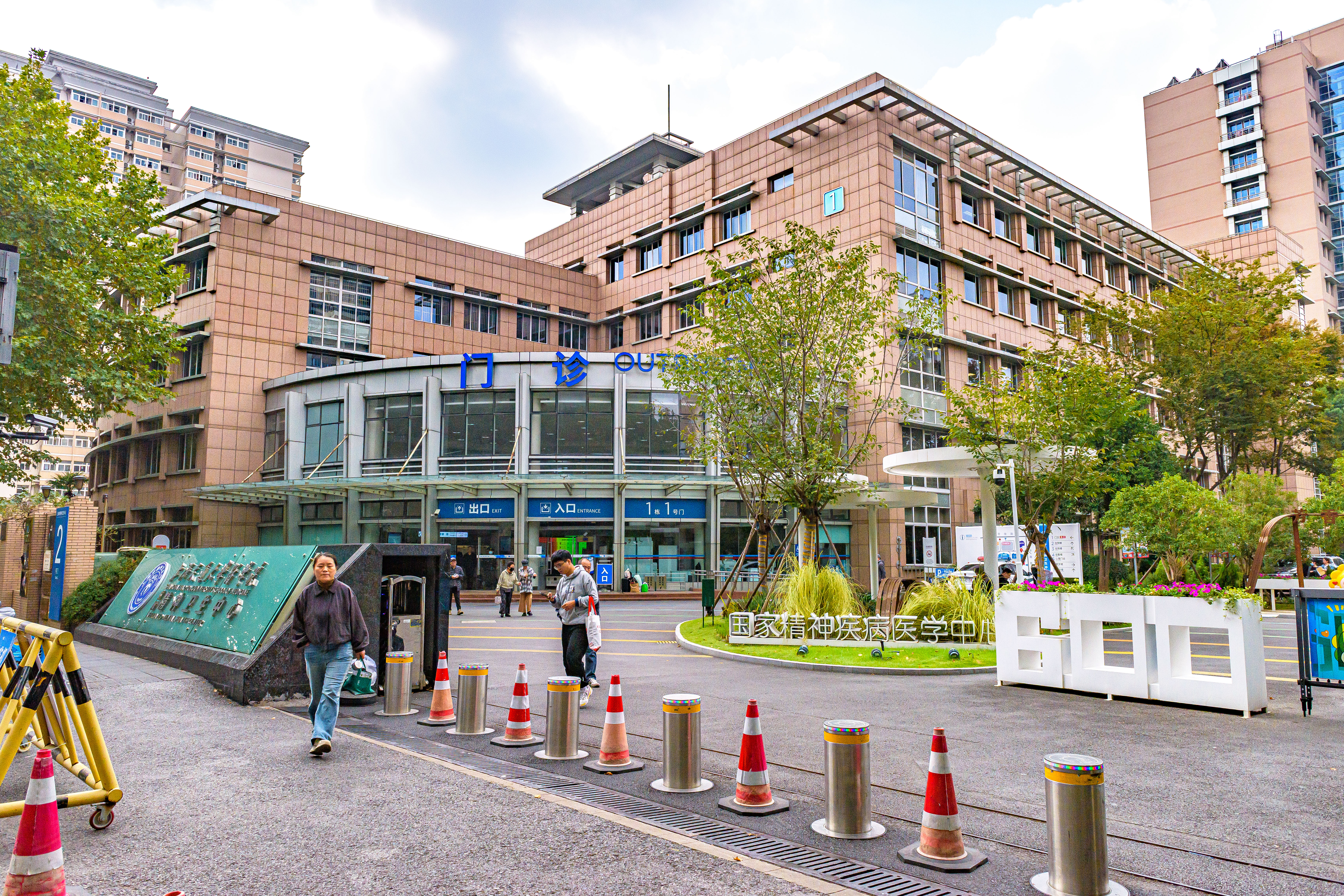

Geography
- Location: 600 South Wanping Road, Shanghai, China

Organisation
- Type: Specialist
- Affiliated university: Shanghai Jiao Tong University School of Medicine

Services
- Speciality: Mental health

History
- Former names: Shanghai Psychological Consultative Center, Puci Rehabilitation Hospital, Shanghai Psychiatric Hospital
- Opened: 1935; 91 years ago

Links
- Website: www.smhc.org.cn
- Lists: Hospitals in China

Shanghai Mental Health Center (simplified Chinese: 上海市精神卫生中心; traditional Chinese: 上海市精神衛生中心; pinyin: Shànghǎishì Jīngshén Wèishēng Zhōngxīn), also known as Shanghai Psychological Consultative Center, is a psychiatric hospital in Shanghai with over 2100 beds. It focuses on treating mental disorders. It was founded in 1935 by Lo Pa Hong, as Puci Rehabilitation Hospital. It was formerly called Shanghai Psychiatric Hospital. Since May 2006, the hospital has been affiliated to the School of Medicine of Shanghai Jiao Tong University. The current president is Xiao Zeping.

== Traffic ==
- Metro Line 4, Shanghai Stadium Station
- Bus: 89, 236, 44, 104, 72

== See also ==
- Health in China
