= Actas Españolas de Psiquiatría =

- Discipline: Psychiatry
- Language: English, Spanish
- Edited by: María I. López-Ibor

Publication details
- Former name(s): Actas Españolas de Psiquiatría y Neurología, Actas Luso-Españolas de Psiquiatría y Neurología, Actas Luso-Españolas de Psiquiatría y Neurología y ciencias afines
- History: 1940-present
- Publisher: Fundación Juan José López-Ibor (Spain)
- Frequency: Bimonthly
- Open access: Yes
- Impact factor: 1.2 (2014)

Standard abbreviations
- ISO 4: Actas Esp. Psiquiatr.

Indexing
- ISSN: 1139-9287 (print); 1578-2735 (web)
- OCLC no.: 60623430

Links
- Journal homepage; Online access; Online archive

The Actas Españolas de Psiquiatría is a bimonthly peer-reviewed medical journal covering psychiatry. It was established in 1940 and is published by the Fundación Juan José López-Ibor, which honors Spanish psychiatrist Juan José López-Ibor, who performed lobotomies and electroschock therapy on patients to "cure" homosexuality. The editor-in-chief is María I. López-Ibor.

== History ==
The journal was established in 1940, by Juan José López-Ibor but changed its name to Actas Españolas de Psiquiatría y Neurología the following year. The journal was renamed Actas Luso-Españolas de Psiquiatría y Neurología in 1944 and published in Lisbon. In the 1970s, y ciencias afines ("and related sciences") was added to the title. The journal regained its original name in 1998.

== Abstracting and indexing ==
The journal is abstracted and indexed in:

- Index Medicus/MEDLINE/PubMed
- Science Citation Index Expanded
- Scopus

According to the Journal Citation Reports, the journal has a 2021 impact factor of 1.681.
