= Australasian Psychiatry =

- Language: English
- Edited by: Vlasios Brakoulias

Publication details
- History: 1993-present
- Publisher: SAGE Publications on behalf of the Royal Australian and New Zealand College of Psychiatrists
- Frequency: Bimonthly
- Impact factor: 0.943 (2018)

Standard abbreviations
- ISO 4: Australas. Psychiatry

Indexing
- ISSN: 1039-8562 (print); 1440-1665 (web)
- LCCN: 96660764
- OCLC no.: 605130283

Links
- Journal homepage; Online access; Online archive

Australasian Psychiatry is a peer-reviewed medical journal that covers the field of psychiatry. The editor-in-chief is Vlasios Brakoulias. It was established in 1993 and is published by SAGE Publications on behalf of the Royal Australian and New Zealand College of Psychiatrists.

== Editors ==
The following persons have been or are editor-in-chief:

- Harry Minas (1993-2000)
- Garry Walter (2001-2013)
- Vlasios Brakoulias (2014–present)

== Abstracting and indexing ==
The journal is abstracted and indexed in:

- EBSCO databases
- Embase
- MEDLINE/PubMed
- ProQuest databases
- PsycINFO
- Science Citation Index Expanded
- Scopus

According to the Journal Citation Reports, the journal has a 2018 impact factor of 0.943.
