= Journal of Geriatric Psychiatry and Neurology =

- Discipline: Geriatrics, psychiatry, neurology
- Language: English
- Edited by: James M. Ellison

Publication details
- History: 1988-present
- Publisher: SAGE Publications
- Frequency: Bimonthly
- Impact factor: 2.109 (2016)

Standard abbreviations
- ISO 4: J. Geriatr. Psychiatry Neurol.

Indexing
- ISSN: 0891-9887 (print); 1552-5708 (web)
- OCLC no.: 1011901113

Links
- Journal homepage; Online access; Online archive

Journal of Geriatric Psychiatry and Neurology is a bimonthly peer-reviewed medical journal covering the fields of psychiatry and neurology in geriatric settings. The journal editor-in-chief is James M. Ellison (Thomas Jefferson University). It was established in 1988 and is published by SAGE Publications.

== Abstracting and indexing ==
The journal is abstracted and indexed in:

- Biological Abstracts
- Current Contents/Clinical Medicine
- Embase
- Index Medicus/MEDLINE/PubMed
- InfoTrac
- PsycINFO
- Science Citation Index

According to the Journal Citation Reports, the journal has a 2016 impact factor of 2.109.
