= Journal of the Brazilian Chemical Society =

- Discipline: Chemistry
- Language: Portuguese, some English

Publication details
- History: 1990–present
- Publisher: Sociedade Brasileira de Química (Brazil)
- Impact factor: 2.135 (2021)

Standard abbreviations
- ISO 4: J. Braz. Chem. Soc.

Indexing
- CODEN: JOCSET
- ISSN: 0103-5053 (print); 1678-4790 (web)

Links
- Journal homepage

The Journal of the Brazilian Chemical Society (print ISSN 0103-5053, eISSN ISSN 1678-4790, CODEN JOCSET) is a Brazilian scientific journal in chemistry. It was founded in 1990 and is published by the Brazilian Society of Chemistry (Sociedade Brasileira de Química), located at the Instituto de Química da Universidade de São Paulo. The journal is online, and the full text is freely available. According to the Journal Citation Reports, the journal has a 2014 impact factor of 1.129, ranking it 100th out of 157 journals in the category "Chemistry Multidisciplinary".

The Brazilian Society of Chemistry publishes other chemistry journals with the titles Química Nova and Química Nova na Escola (QNEsc).

The Journal of the Brazilian Chemical Society should not be confounded with publications from the Associação Brasileira de Química (ABQ) in Rio de Janeiro. The latter publishes the Anais da ABQ.

== See also ==
- Anais da ABQ
- Brazilian Journal of Chemical Engineering
- Química Nova
- Revista Brasileira de Chímica
- Revista Brasileira de Engenharia Química, Caderno de Engenharia Química
