= Molecular Psychiatry =

- Discipline: Psychiatry, genetics, behavioral sciences, neuroscience
- Language: English
- Edited by: Julio Licinio

Publication details
- History: 1997–present
- Publisher: Nature Publishing Group
- Frequency: Monthly
- Impact factor: 9.6 (2023)

Standard abbreviations
- ISO 4: Mol. Psychiatry

Indexing
- ISSN: 1359-4184 (print); 1476-5578 (web)

Links
- Journal homepage

Molecular Psychiatry is a peer-reviewed scientific journal published by Nature Publishing Group. It covers research in biological psychiatry.

== Abstracting and indexing ==
The journal is abstracted and indexed in:

- Current Contents
- Current Contents/Life Sciences
- EMBASE/Excerpta Medica
- MEDLINE/Index Medicus
- Neuroscience Citation Index
- PsycINFO
- Research Alert
- Science Citation Index
- Science Citation Index Expanded
- SciSearch

According to the Journal Citation Reports, Molecular Psychiatry had an impact factor of 9.6 in 2023, ranking it 6th among 156 journals in the category "Psychiatry", 6th among 273 journals in the category "Neuroscience", and 11th among 298 journals in the category "Biochemistry & Molecular Biology".

== See also ==
- List of psychiatry journals
- Translational Psychiatry, its sister journal
