= Journal of Psychiatry & Neuroscience =

- Discipline: Psychiatry, neuroscience
- Language: English
- Edited by: Lena Palaniyappan, Paul Albert

Publication details
- Former name(s): Psychiatric Journal of the University of Ottawa
- History: 1976-present
- Publisher: Canadian Medical Association (Canada)
- Frequency: Bimonthly
- Open access: Yes
- Impact factor: 5.699 (2021)

Standard abbreviations
- ISO 4: J. Psychiatry Neurosci.

Indexing
- CODEN: JPNEEF
- ISSN: 1180-4882 (print); 1488-2434 (web)
- LCCN: 91641773
- OCLC no.: 476993381
- Psychiatric Journal of the University of Ottawa
- ISSN: 0702-8466

Links
- Journal homepage

The Journal of Psychiatry & Neuroscience is a bimonthly open access peer-reviewed scientific journal covering research in psychiatry and neuroscience concerning the mechanisms involved in the etiology and treatment of psychiatric disorders. The journal was established in 1976 as the Psychiatric Journal of the University of Ottawa and obtained its current title in 1991. It is published by the Canadian Medical Association and the current (2021) editors-in-chief are Paul Albert and Lena Palaniyappan (McGill University).

== Abstracting and indexing ==
The journal is abstracted and indexed in Index Medicus/MEDLINE/PubMed, Science Citation Index Expanded, Social Sciences Citation Index, Current Contents/Social & Behavioral Sciences, and BIOSIS Previews. According to the Journal Citation Reports, the journal has a 2021 impact factor of 5.699.
