= Translational Psychiatry =

- Discipline: Biological psychiatry
- Language: English
- Edited by: Julio Licinio

Publication details
- History: 2011-present
- Publisher: Nature Publishing Group
- Frequency: Upon acceptance
- Open access: Yes
- License: Creative Commons licenses
- Impact factor: 7.989 (2021)

Standard abbreviations
- ISO 4: Transl. Psychiatry

Indexing
- CODEN: TPRSCF
- ISSN: 2158-3188
- OCLC no.: 676912891

Links
- Journal homepage

Translational Psychiatry is a peer-reviewed medical journal published by Nature Publishing Group. It is a sister journal to the better-known Molecular Psychiatry. While both journals cover the larger field of biological psychiatry, Translational Psychiatry is more focused on translational aspects of research. It was launched on April 5, 2011, when the editor-in-chief of both journals, Julio Licinio, announced it during the First National Symposium on Translational Psychiatry at The Australian National University. One of the first articles was a guest editorial by Thomas Insel, who stated that "Translational Psychiatry has an opportunity to make a difference by publishing the best science at a time when we can see this historic bridge being built that will link science, practice and policy. I, for one, will watch (and read) with enthusiasm." Translational Psychiatry has been criticized for requiring author fees to submit critiques of articles published in the journal since this could insulate articles from critics.

== Abstracting and indexing ==
The journal is abstracted and indexed in:

- Chemical Abstracts
- Current Contents/Clinical Medicine
- EBSCO databases
- Excerpta Medica
- ProQuest
- MEDLINE/PubMed
- Science Citation Index Expanded
- DOAJ
