= Brazilian Journal of Psychiatry =

- Discipline: Psychiatry
- Language: English
- Edited by: Andre Brunoni, Antonio Egidio Nardi

Publication details
- Former names: Revista ABP, Revista Brasileira de Psiquiatria
- History: 1979-present
- Publisher: Brazilian Association of Psychiatry (Brazil)
- Frequency: Bimonthly
- Open access: Yes
- Impact factor: 5.5 (2022)

Standard abbreviations
- ISO 4: Braz. J. Psychiatry

Indexing
- ISSN: 1516-4446 (print); 1809-452X (web)
- OCLC no.: 423498839

Links
- Journal homepage; Online archive

The Brazilian Journal of Psychiatry (BJP) is the official journal of the Associação Brasileira de Psiquiatria (ABP - Brazilian Association of Psychiatry). It was formerly titled Revista ABP and Revista Brasileira de Psiquiatria, and was originally a quarterly publication; in 2019, it transitioned to an English-language name and six yearly volumes.

Its purpose is to publish original works from all areas of psychiatry, focusing on public health, clinical epidemiology, basic sciences, and mental health problems. The journal also publishes two annual supplements, focusing mainly on clinical updates.

BJP is a fully OA journal, publishing under the CC BY-SA license, and levies no article processing charges.
