= Brazilian Chemical Society =

- Sociedade Brasileira de Química
- Abbreviation: SBQ
- Formation: July 1977
- Purpose: Promotion of chemistry
- Headquarters: São Paulo
- Location: Brazil
- Official language: Portuguese; English
- Main organ: Journal
- Website: www.sbq.org.br

The Brazilian Chemical Society (Sociedade Brasileira de Química) is a not for profit organization that supports Chemistry in Brazil. It was founded in 1977.

It publishes the Journal of the Brazilian Chemical Society.
