= Lutnick (surname) =

Other names
- Variant forms: Lutnik; Liutnik (transliterated from Russian or Ukrainian "Лютник")

Lutnick is a surname of Slavic and possibly Yiddish origin (Polish: Lutnik, "luthier"). It may refer to:

- Howard Lutnick (born 1961), American businessman and government official
- Solomon Lutnick (1928–1979), American historian

== See also ==
- Lutnik (creek), creek in Slovenia
