= Yangtze River Delta Project =

Data center in China

Longrui Yangtze River Delta Artificial Intelligence Advanced Computing Center
- 珑睿长三角人工智能先进计算中心

General information
- Location: Songjiang District, Shanghai, China
- Construction started: 2020

Longrui Yangtze River Delta Artificial Intelligence Advanced Computing Center
- Simplified Chinese: 珑睿长三角人工智能先进计算中心
- Traditional Chinese: 瓏睿長三角人工智慧先進運算中心
Transcriptions
Standard Mandarin
- Hanyu Pinyin: Lóngruì Zhǎng sānjiǎo Réngōng Zhìnéng Xiānjìn Jìsuàn Zhōngxīn

Tencent Yangtze River Delta Artificial Intelligence Advanced Computing Center
- Simplified Chinese: 腾讯长三角人工智能先进计算中心
- Traditional Chinese: 騰訊長三角人工智慧先進計算中心
Transcriptions
Standard Mandarin
- Hanyu Pinyin: Téngxùn Zhǎng Sānjiǎo Réngōng Zhìnéng Xiānjìn Jìsuàn Zhōngxīn

The Yangtze River Delta Project, officially the Longrui Yangtze River Delta Artificial Intelligence Advanced Computing Center and formerly known as the Tencent Yangtze River Delta Artificial Intelligence Advanced Computing Center, is a data center and supporting facility in Songjiang, Shanghai, China. It is a project of cooperation between Tencent and Songjiang and is positioned as a major strategic infrastructure for the development of Shanghai's artificial intelligence industry. The construction and operation party is Shanghai Longrui Information Technology Company.

== History ==
On 31 May 2020, Tencent signed a strategic cooperation agreement with the People's Government of Songjiang District, Shanghai, to jointly build the Tencent Yangtze River Delta Artificial Intelligence Supercomputing Center and Industrial Base project. The initial investment reached ¥45 billion renminbi. The total planned construction area was 353,920 square meters, with a planned land area of 236 mu. The land was acquired on 27 May 2020, and the land certificate was obtained. The construction permit was obtained on 30 May, while construction officially started on 6 June.

On 15 June 2020, Zhejiang Century Huatong Group issued an announcement that it would acquire 10% of the shares of Shanghai Longrui and increase its capital by ¥3.1 billion renminbi, and at the same time disclosed a financing plan for ¥5.7 billion renminbi convertible bonds. In the same year, Shanghai Longrui became a holding subsidiary of Century Huatong. On 25 March 2021, Century Huatong disclosed that it planned to transfer 50.10% of the equity of Shanghai Longrui to Prologis Investment (Shanghai) Co., Ltd. and its affiliates for ¥4 billion renminbi, and Prologis would also bear ¥2 billion renminbi in acquisition loans. On July 23, news came that the acquisition was completed.

The power capacity of this project is the largest among data centers in Shanghai. Shanghai South Power Group provided a supporting intelligent construction plan for the project and completed the power supply construction in 12 months, shortening the time by one-third. In June 2021, the first and second power supplies were successfully put into operation.

During the March 2022 Shanghai COVID-19 outbreak, the project was one of the first construction sites approved to resume work and production, and gradually resumed work from 3 May. The May report stated that the total construction area was 500,000 square meters. On 27 September 2022, the eight buildings in the North District were completed, of which Buildings No. 7 and No. 8 were put into use, and more than 10,000 servers were running normally. As of May 2023, four buildings have been delivered, and two more are planned to be delivered within the year.

In 2023, the Shanghai Municipal People's Government announced that Shanghai Longjing Information Technology would build the project with 6,000 AI server racks. The company was founded in December 2020 as a data-center focused subsidiary of Century Huatong, which had also bought a 10 percent stake in 7Road in the same month. Alice Huang had served as the company's director form 2021 to 2022. According to The Wire China, Tencent rents rack space from the company, which it uses to fill with own chips. A Tencent spokesperson subsequently said Tencent has never had a stake in the complex or operated it, while The Wire China said it is unknown if Huang held an operational role at Shanghai Longjing. In October 2023, Century Litong, a company connected to Alice Huang, delivered servers including Nvidia H800 to the Yangtze River Delta Project. The company also runs servers at the project under a lease of about US$54 million from a leasing arm of the Aviation Industry Corporation of China.

In July 2026, in the "Report on Public Participation in the Construction Plan of the '6G+AI+Satellite Internet+Space-Based Computing' Integrated Space-Air-Ground Industrial Cluster in Songjiang District (2026-2030)", the Songjiang District Data Bureau proposed to change the original "Tencent Yangtze River Delta Artificial Intelligence Advanced Computing Center" in the construction plan to "Longrui Yangtze River Delta Artificial Intelligence Advanced Computing Center" because of the change in project name. This opinion was officially adopted. The press release at the same time stated that the planned building area is over 500,000 square meters, with a total investment of ¥15 billion renminbi. 12,000 cabinets had been built and put into operation, and more than 48,000 high-performance GPUs have been deployed, which supports the main training and inference tasks of Tencent Hunyuan and Tencent Yuanbao AI models.

Kang Wei is the president of the data center, and his company Shanghai Hexi provided financial backing for the project. In November 2026, after Nvidia CEO Jensen Huang's extramarital affair with Alice Huang, Kang Wei's wife, was exposed, Alice Huang and Kang's association with the data center came under attention. In 2024, an investor presentation from Megaspeed, Alice Huang's company, featured a rendering of the center. Between May and June 2024, a subsidiary of Shanghai Longteng Intelligent Computing, a company founded by Alice Huang and majority-owned by her sister, Huang Yu, until January 2026, installed computing servers valued at ¥747 million renminbi at the Shanghai facility. The New York Times reported that the couple's company had been involved in the project since 2020 (when the project started) by circumventing U.S. export controls through overseas companies to ship Nvidia chips to the data center.

== Facility ==
A total of 16 buildings were planned, divided into the South Zone and the North Zone by the internal river. It was expected that after completion, there would be nearly 40,000 server racks and 800,000 servers. The computing power was projected to be 10 times that of the world's number one supercomputing center. It was projected become the largest single data center in China and reach the world's leading level. According to the plan, Tencent's three artificial intelligence laboratories—Keen Lab, YouTu Lab, and Weiling Lab—would be located in the industrial park. More than 60 Tencent ecosystem companies, including Changshan Beiming, Donghua Software, T3 Mobility, and Lingque Cloud, would also move into the park.
