= Megaspeed =

Singaporean cloud computing company

- Formerly: 7Road International (2015–2023)
- Type: Private
- Industry: Cloud computing
- Founded: 2015; 11 years ago
- Headquarters: Singapore
- Key people: Tan Yong Pong (CEO)
- Services: AI computing; Hosting
- Total assets: ▲US$3 billion (2024)
- Parent: Swiftdata
- Subsidiaries: Speedmatrix
- Website: megaspeed.ai

Megaspeed International Pte. Ltd. is a cloud computing provider based in Singapore. It supplies artificial intelligence computing power and hosting services.

The company was founded in 2015 as 7Road International PTE, the Singaporean subsidiary of the Chinese gaming firm 7Road Holdings. It was acquired by Chinese investor Alice Huang in 2023, and renamed to Megaspeed. Huang served as the company's director from March to November 2023, when the company was acquired by Singaporean citizen Tan Yong Pong through his company Swiftdata. Reporting indicates Huang continued to exercise leadership over the company afterwards; Megaspeed maintains she left the company in August 2025.

Megaspeed established a close business partnership with the online Chinese retailer Alibaba Group, which became its biggest client and anchor customer for cloud services in Southeast Asia. Megaspeed also developed ties with Nvidia, becoming an Nvidia Cloud Partner. Megaspeed bought billions of dollars worth Nvidia products for data centres throughout Southeast Asia, including in Malaysia.

From 2024, the company came under investigation by the U.S. authorities for suspicions it was supplying Nvidia chips to China without U.S. government permission. Singapore and Malaysia also launched their own investigations. The company came under further scrutiny following reports that Alice Huang was in a romantic relationship with Nvidia CEO Jensen Huang.

== History ==
Megaspeed was founded in 2015 as 7Road International PTE, the Singaporean subsidiary of the Chinese gaming firm 7Road Holdings. In March 2023, a few months after the United States government imposed export restrictions on artificial intelligence chips to China, Chinese investor Alice Huang and a group of investors acquired the subsidiary. The purchase was done through a British Virgin Islands-registered company associated with Huang called Huang Le Ltd.

After the purchase, the company was renamed to Megaspeed International. The Straits Times reported that Megaspeed has been almost completely shut down since 2025 and has hired external legal counsel to conduct an internal investigation.

== Corporate affairs ==
Alice Huang joined the company following her purchase in March 2023 and serving as its managing director until November 2023. Kang Wei, an executive at the private equity firm Shanghai Hexi who is Huang's husband, also worked with Huang in building the business. According to a human resources manager contacted by the The New York Times in 2025, most of Megaspeed's directors were based in China and rarely visited Singapore, while James Tan, the company's Singapore director, was never present.

In November 2023, Megaspeed was acquired from Huang Le Ltd by Swiftdata, a Singapore-based company owned by Singaporean citizen Tan Yong Pong, which had been incorporated a few weeks before. Following the acquisition, Tan became Megaspeed's sole director. As of October 2025, Tan was residing in Shanghai. According to an investigation by Culper Research, Huang was still in charge of the company in May 2026.

The Journal also reported that she continued to act as the company's leader since then, introducing herself as Megaspeed's CEO to a business partner as recently as August 2025. On November 15, 2026, Megaspeed said Huang had left the company on August 30, 2025 and had no current rule there. Huang continued to participate in participate in the chip procurement and fundraising work of Swiftdata as a senior manager until she left the company in 2025.

=== Subsidiaries ===
In 2024, Megaspeed registered affiliates across the United States, Australia, Malaysia, Indonesia, and Thailand. The Shanghai-born Kai Kang was registered as the director of all subsidiaries; his provided address in Australia led to a small store in Seymour, Victoria, where a news agency named Seymour News. The Indonesia subsidiary was created in May 2024. The affiliate in the U.S. was registered in Delaware. The Australian subsidiary was registered with Australian Securities Exchange with the provided address being a virtual office which the company had used for administrative purposes. In the fall of 2024, Alice Huang also set up a Megaspeed related shell company in Japan, where a man hired for mainly translation work ended up as the representative of the company unbeknownst to him.

In 2024, Tan Yong Pong also established Speedmatrix, a Malaysia-based subsidiary. Swiftdata's actual office scale in Singapore was limited, with only one storefront office and only 2 to 10 employees listed on LinkedIn. Agence France-Presse reported that the contact number listed on the company's official website was actually a private residence. The New York Times reported Swiftdata's address led to an accounting firm in Singapore, where employees did not know how to reach Tan. The Times reported that the registered address of Speedmatrix in shipping records was a "dilapidated storefront outside Kuala Lumpur, where the sign out front advertised a construction company". Speedmatrix has an office on the upper floors of a shopping mall in Johor.

== Business dealings ==
One of Megaspeed's biggest clients became Alibaba Group, the online Chinese retailer. Megaspeed was Alibaba Group's anchor customer for cloud services in Southeast Asia since the beginning, and was its biggest client. The Wall Street Journal reported Alibaba Group was looking for a partner that would help it access data centers with chips from the American multinational technology corporation Nvidia. Megaspeed told the Nvidia team in an early meeting about its relationship with Alibaba Group. Megaspeed later told Nvidia that Alibaba Group would be an anchor customer. Later, Megaspeed became an Nvidia Cloud Partner in the Asia-Pacific region, giving the company priority access to chips, and acquired around US$5 billion in AI chips and advanced hardware in November 2023.

According to The Wall Street Journal, Alice Huang had leveraged her connections with Nvidia CEO Jensen Huang to get Megaspeed to become an Nvidia Cloud Partner. In June 2024, Alibaba Group, through its Singaporean subsidiary called Apex Enterprise Solutions, lent money to Megaspeed, via its Malaysian subsidiary Speedmatrix, with Speedmatrix pledging its entire business as collateral for the loan. In 2024, Megaspeed's balance sheet increased from $33 million to $3 billion, mostly due to its subsidiaries’ dealings. In the summer of 2024, Megaspeed International entered into a joint partnership with Nvidia. Megaspeed was planning on purchasing $2 billion of Nvidia's stock.

In November 2026, The New York Times reported that Alibaba, which three people familiar with the relationship described as Megaspeed's customer and financial backer, had in 2017 co-founded Zhejiang Lab, a research institute with close links to China's military, where researchers had worked on automated hacking and war-game simulations; the lab's director, Wang Jian, was formerly Alibaba's chief technology officer.

The Times said it was not clear whether chips supplied by Megaspeed had passed from Alibaba to the lab, but that these links opened the possibility that Megaspeed's Nvidia chips were supporting Chinese military research, which U.S. law prohibits. Alibaba called any suggestion that it provides services to the military groundless and said its cloud service agreement bars military use; Megaspeed's chief executive, James Tan, said the matter was under independent review and the company had reached no conclusions.

=== Purchases ===
The Information reported Megaspeed had imported Nvidia chips and either rented them to Chinese companies or physically shipped them to China. Trade records and foreign media investigations show that during the period of U.S. export controls, Alice Huang intervened in the supply chain through a network of affiliated companies established in China and Singapore, facilitating the flow of up to 240,000 restricted chips, with a total value of at least US$7.5 billion, into China; and from June 2024 to February 2026, Megaspeed's affiliated companies in Malaysia mainly purchased at least US$4.8 billion worth of computing equipment (including advanced AI chips such as Nvidia GB200 NVL72 and HGX H100) through Aivres, the U.S. subsidiary of Inspur, a server manufacturer in China, for building data centers in Malaysia and Indonesia, and then leasing the computing power to Alibaba.

The Wall Street Journal estimated that from March 2024 and June 2025, Megaspeed had sent Nvidia chips worth nearly US$12 billion to companies in China. The New York Times reported Speedmatrix more than US$800 million Nvidia technology restricted for China from February to October 2026, including Blackwell and H200 chips. Most Speedmatrix purchases were done through third-party intermediaries, through there was a U$13 million shipment from Nvidia in February 2026.

The company started receiving multimillion-dollar shipments from Nvidia few weeks after June 2024. Nvidia had determined that Megaspeed was a Singaporean company, believing the purchases to be legal. Megaspeed bought US$1 billion worth of Nvidia technology in the next month, followed by another US$1 billion in the next nine months. A bulk of those chips were bought from Aivres and went to Speedmatrix. The Information reported some Nvidia hardware originally bought by Speedmatrix subsequently reached Shanghai Century Litong, a company affiliated with Alice Huang.

From 2024 to 2026, the Indonesian subsidiary of Megaspeed had purchased hardware from Nvidia, including H100 processors, from Giga Computing a subsidiary of Gigabyte Technology. Megaspeed imported Nvidia hardware worth at least $4.6 billion from its founding in 2023 to November 2025, including around 136,000 Nvidia GPUs; more than half of the chips are Blackwell GPUs, with the majority of such GPUs having been delivered in the six weeks leading up to 15 May 2025 and another patch having been delivered in November 2025. At least two-thirds of the company's imports are Nvidia processors.

=== Data center projects ===
According to the Journal, Megaspeed brought servers it acquired from Nvidia to data centers in Malaysia, which provided computing power to Alibaba, and shipped some of the servers to China, including the Shanghai-based Century Litong which Kang Wei had done business with. The Times also reported, citing five people familiar with the project, that Megaspeed's Malaysian subsidiary Speedmatrix operated Nvidia chips on Alibaba's behalf at a data center in Johor developed by the conglomerate YTL, a project Jensen Huang had announced during a visit to Malaysia in December 2023.

The Journal reported Kang and Huang planned several data centre projects from late 2024 to June 2025, including two in Southeast Asia and one in Shanghai, with the couple expressing confidence expecting to triple their money in three years and get Nvidia chips to China. Also, in 2024, Megaspeed investor presentation featured a rendering of the Yangtze River Delta Project, an artificial intelligence data center located in Shanghai. Between May and June 2024, a subsidiary of Shanghai Longteng Intelligent Computing, a company founded by Alice Huang and majority-owned by her sister, Huang Yu, until January 2026, installed computing servers valued at ¥747 million renminbi at the Shanghai facility.

Another company, Shanghai Shuoyao Technology Corporation, had installed Nvidia H100 and H200 processors on its data center. Shanghai Shuoyao has been described by Bloomberg News as "something of Megaspeed’s Chinese corporate twin". Bloomberg reported that the company's posts on its WeChat account of its Indonesia staff depict Megaspeed's employees, Shanghai Shuoyao's map of its data centers resembles Megaspeed's facilities, while the company's website was "almost a carbon copy" of Megaspeed sub-brand Lumina's page before it was taken down. Shanghai Shuoyao's job ads in China included work for "H100, H200 and other GPU models". The Yangtze River Delta Project's president was reported by Shanghai media to be Kang Wei, and Shanghai Hexi provided financial backing for the project.

In January 2025, a unit of Shanghai Longteng Intelligent Computing filed documents with the People's Bank of China pledging 193 servers at the Yangtze River Delta Project as collateral for financing. The hardware, valued at ¥485 million renminbi, included 119 servers from Gigabyte Technology, 52 servers from Super Micro Computer containing restricted Nvidia H100 and H200 chips, and 22 Dell Technologies servers containing restricted Nvidia H800 chips. The Dell servers were originally sold to Aperia Cloud Services, another Singapore-based Nvidia Cloud Partner.

In February 2025, Dell ceased sales to Aperia due to unauthorized diversion concerns, and later its chief executive officer was arrested in Singapore for defrauding server suppliers. In early 2025, Huang and Kang sought investment worth several hundred million dollars for a Southeast Asia data center project, and told investors they had "no problem securing GPUs" and cited Alibaba Group as a partner for the project.

== Investigations ==
=== U.S. investigations ===
The amount and scale of Megaspeed's purchases far exceeded those of similar companies, which attracted the attention of the U.S. government. In 2024, during the Biden Administration, the United States Department of Commerce was investigating whether Megaspeed was circumventing American export restrictions. Their suspicion held that Huang was flying to Taiwan, repackaging Nvidia chips, and smuggling them into China to be sold as Megaspeed products. In September 2024, an official from the Bureau of Industry and Security (BIS) visited Megaspeed's data center in Malaysia to investigate suspicions on company's purchases. The official found that a large number of Nvidia high-end equipment were still in shipping containers and had not been unpacked, installed or put into operation, causing suspicion that the park might be involved in the illegal transfer of advanced chips subject to export controls to China. Bloomberg News later reported that Megaspeed had imported about 136,000 Nvidia GPUs, but when Nvidia auditors came to inspect, they only found a few thousand of the latest model chips.

From 2025, the U.S. Commerce Department and intelligence agencies began investigating the company for potential export control violations regarding the alleged shipment of restricted Nvidia processors to Chinese firms. During the investigation, Nivida took the initiative to ask U.S. government officials whether it was necessary to suspend business dealings with Megaspeed, but the answer at the time was “no need”. The New York Times revealed that Tim Teter, general counsel of Nvidia, sent an email in August 2025 to investigators BIS at the U.S. Department of Commerce who were investigating the illegal transfer of chips to China, requesting a meeting with them. After such a meeting was declined, Teter asked if there was an issue, claiming that Under Secretary of Commerce for Industry and Security Jeffrey I. Kessler had agreed to let him contact the investigators; some officials viewed this as violating government procedures, as it would mean the Department of Commerce was discussing the case with Nvidia. The officials forwarded the email chain to Kessler, who responded by saying they should continue handling the case by strictly following the laws. The investigation was abruptly suspended at the end of 2025 and transferred to the U.S. Department of Justice for follow-up in 2026, which the Times reported requested after the Justice Department asked the Commerce Department to suspend its investigation, which it complied to, and was to avoid any potential compromise of the government’s investigation. In addition, Axios reported that U.S. President Donald Trump approved action on the alleged transfer of Nvidia chips to China on at least three different occasions in May, August and 5 November 2026. However, U.S. Commerce Secretary Howard Lutnick and Under Secretary Kessler refused to take action due to concerns that the control measures would trigger a China–United States trade war.

In November 2026, Nvidia CEO Jensen Huang resigned following reports of an extramarital affair with Alice Huang, whom United States intelligence agencies have flagged as a Chinese intelligence asset and was using Megaspeed and its associated corporate network to pass commercial information and restricted technology to Beijing. On November 11, the Times reported that U.S. Treasury Secretary Scott Bessent had confronted Lutnick regarding Megaspeed on November 5, with Lutnick replying the department now could move quickly to put restrictions. On 13 November, Bessent accused the Department of Commerce of inaction, saying several agencies including the Department of the Treasury, the Department of Defense, the Department of State and the Office of the U.S. Trade Representative "were in favour of putting Megaspeed on the entity list for months" but "Commerce has the pen... and you will have to ask them about their internal process". He added "The story has been thus far of Jensen Huang's personal foibles" and said "The real story here should be: did Nvidia know their client, and was there a robust effort at Nvidia to make sure that there was no leakage and that they were selling to what were obviously pass-through shell companies? It's important that anyone at the company there be held accountable for that." On November 16, the Department of Commerce and Department of Justice announced they were pursuing a criminal investigation into the company. The announcement said the Commerce Department had initiated the investigation in 2024, and that it had requested records from Nvidia in May 2025, while officials from the department visited Megaspeed and interviewed Alice Huang in June 2025. It said the DOJ took the lead in the investigation afterwards.

=== Southeast Asian investigations ===
After the (BIS) visit in September 2024, the U.S. government relayed their worries to Singapore, Malaysia and Nvidia. In February 2025, Singaporean authorities initiated an investigation into Megaspeed and Alice Huang for allegedly smuggling Nvidia chips into China. From 2025, Singapore and Malaysia also launched investigations into Megaspeed and its subsidiary, Speedmatrix, over suspected breaches of domestic laws related to the diversion of advanced AI chips. Singapore's Ministry of Home Affairs later said in November 2026 that it had sought information from Nvidia partner Supermicro, which had also supplied to Megaspeed, but the company had given "limited cooperation". It stated it had raised this issue with the U.S. Department of Justice and Federal Bureau of Investigation (FBI) in July 2025 and "requested their assistance in securing the company’s cooperation" but that "Despite these repeated requests, Singapore has to date received limited information or assistance in respect of the company". Following a 2025 investigation, Singaporean and Taiwanese authorities barred former director Alice Huang from re-entering their countries but was allowed to return to Beijing. In her absence, another CEO has been overseeing Megaspeed's operations. The ‌Straits Times reported that upon a request by the FBI, the Indonesian police had conducted a raid to Megaspeed's Indonesia subsidiary in early 2026, where they found unopened server racks but no GPUs, raising suspicions that Nvidia hardware was brought to China in private jets from Indonesia.

By November 2026, Singapore prosecutors had charged five individuals in relation to the Aperia case. During the same month, Nvidia CEO Jensen Huang resigned following reports of an extramarital affair with Alice Huang, whom United States intelligence agencies have flagged as a Chinese intelligence asset and was using Megaspeed and its associated corporate network to pass commercial information and restricted technology to Beijing. On 13 November, Johari Abdul Ghani, Malaysia's Minister of Investment, Trade and Industry, said that it is working with customs to determine whether any chips brought into Malaysia by SpeedMatrix, a Malaysian subsidiary of the Singapore-based cloud computing firm Megaspeed, were re-exported to other countries. On 16 November, Singapore said it was discussing with the U.S. about the company, and said Singapore's Minister for Digital Development and Information Josephine Teo had discussed with U.S. Deputy Secretary of State Christopher Landau regarding Megaspeed last week in Washington, D.C.
