= Century Huatong =

Chinese technology company

Zhejiang Century Huatong Group Co., Ltd.
- Native name: 浙江世纪华通集团股份有限公司
- Type: Private
- Traded as: SZSE: 002602
- Headquarters: Shaoxing, Zhejiang, China
- Key people: Wang Ji (Chairman)
- Website: www.sjhuatong.com

Zhejiang Century Huatong Group Co., Ltd., branded as Century Huatong, is a Chinese technology company headquartered in Shaoxing, Zhejiang, China. Primarily known for video games, the company has expanded into data center infrastructure in the 2020s.

== History ==
Century Huatong was originally a secondary supplier engaged in the research, development, manufacturing and sales of various automotive plastic parts and related molds. Later, it acquired game companies such as Tianyou Software, Qiku Network, Zhangyou Technology, and DianDian Interactive, thus becoming an internet game company. In 2017, Century Huatong acquired Shengqu Games in a US$4.2 billiom deal. In recent years, it has also been involved in the fields of artificial intelligence and data centers. In 2017, Hangzhou Shengfeng was bought from Century Huatong by a Hexi Capital-backed fund in 2017 for ¥500 million renminbi.

On 15 June 2020, Century Huatong issued an announcement that it would acquire 10% of the shares of Shanghai Longrui, which was involved in the Yangtze River Delta Project, and increase its capital by ¥3.1 billion renminbi, and at the same time disclosed a financing plan for ¥5.7 billion renminbi convertible bonds. In the same year, Shanghai Longrui became a holding subsidiary of Century Huatong. On 25 March 2021, Century Huatong disclosed that it planned to transfer 50.10% of the equity of Shanghai Longrui to Prologis Investment (Shanghai) Co., Ltd. and its affiliates for ¥4 billion renminbi, and Prologis would also bear ¥2 billion renminbi in acquisition loans. On July 23, news came that the acquisition was completed.

In December 2020, the Shanghai Longjing Information Technology was founded as data-center focused subsidiary of Century Huatong. In the same month, Century Huatong bought a 10% stake in 7Road. As of 2021, Century Huatong held a controlling 63% stake at Century Longteng.

== Corporate affairs ==
Wang Ji is the chairman of Century Huatong, and holds 10.4% stake of the company. Wang Ji previously owned a 51% stake in Zhenao Network, a Ningxia-based company dissolved in 2017, where Hu Xiaowei, the alleged "second-in-chief" of Prince Group was a director. Another director of Zhenao Network owns a Chongqing-based company that controls multiple gaming companies associated with Fang Zhizhen, another person linked with Prince Group. Hu and his associates were linked to a group that hosted The Legend of Mir games, whose owner of the Chinese rights is Shengqu Games, on private serves. Kang Wei, the head of Hexi Capital and Alice Huang's husband, was an early investor in the company. As of July 2020, Tencent held a 5% stake in Century Huatong.
