= Jensen Huang scandal =

Alleged spy plot targeting Nvidia CEO

- Jensen Huang in April 2026
- Date: October – November 2026
- Type: Extramarital affair
- Reporter: The New York Times
- Participants: Alice Huang; Jensen Huang; Kimberly Powell
- Outcome: Jensen Huang resigned as CEO, President, and board member of Nvidia

On October 29, 2026, The New York Times reported that Jensen Huang, the co-founder and CEO of Nvidia, had been the target of a spy plot involving the government of China, citing people briefed on U.S. intelligence surveillance who spoke on condition of anonymity. Huang had an extramarital affair with Alice Huang (no relation), a Chinese national who was an executive of Megaspeed, a Singaporean company. U.S. officials reportedly suspected that she had been recruited by China's Ministry of State Security as a spy. On November 11, the Times reported, citing five Nvidia employees, that Jensen Huang had also had an extramarital relationship with Kimberly Powell, an executive who reported to him. That same day, Nvidia's board met to discuss his ouster and accepted his resignation, which the company announced the following day.

President Donald Trump was briefed on the intelligence in 2025 and in May 2026, and chose not to act. U.S. officials did not warn Jensen Huang through a defensive briefing. On November 12, Attorney General Todd Blanche said the Justice Department had reached no conclusion about whether Alice Huang was a spy, and CNN reported, citing multiple sources, that the intelligence collected on her did not prove she had acted as one. The next day, the Times reported that multiple people who had reviewed the underlying U.S. intelligence stated that they were confident in their information about her interactions with Chinese intelligence and believed she was an "asset" rather than a trained intelligence officer, and that the investigations were still ongoing. On November 16, Trump said he did not know whether she was a spy.

Singapore's Ministry of Home Affairs said there was insufficient evidence that Alice Huang had committed the suspected offenses relating to possible false declarations in server purchases, and that Singapore did not investigate her for espionage. She was issued a stern warning and barred from re-entering Singapore after police assessed that she had knowingly given them inaccurate information about her role in Megaspeed; inquiries into Megaspeed continue. The Chinese government denied involvement, dismissing the claims as "groundless speculation". Megaspeed said that Alice Huang had left the company in August 2025, and that media reports contained assertions about its business that were "not supported by verifiable evidence".

By November 20, Nvidia's market value had fallen by about US$2.7 trillion from its October 6 peak, amid the scandal, the investigations that followed and a wider sell-off in chip stocks. Several tech leaders suggest the scandal may have been orchestrated as a strategic plot against Jensen Huang. Many Silicon Valley executives and investors publicly backed Jensen Huang after his resignation, and an open letter asking Nvidia's board to reinstate him drew more than 178,000 signatures within four days. On November 17, the board's chair said it did not intend to reinstate him. Treasury Secretary Scott Bessent called for Nvidia to hire its next chief executive from outside the company, while President Trump called for Jensen Huang to be given a second chance.

== Background ==
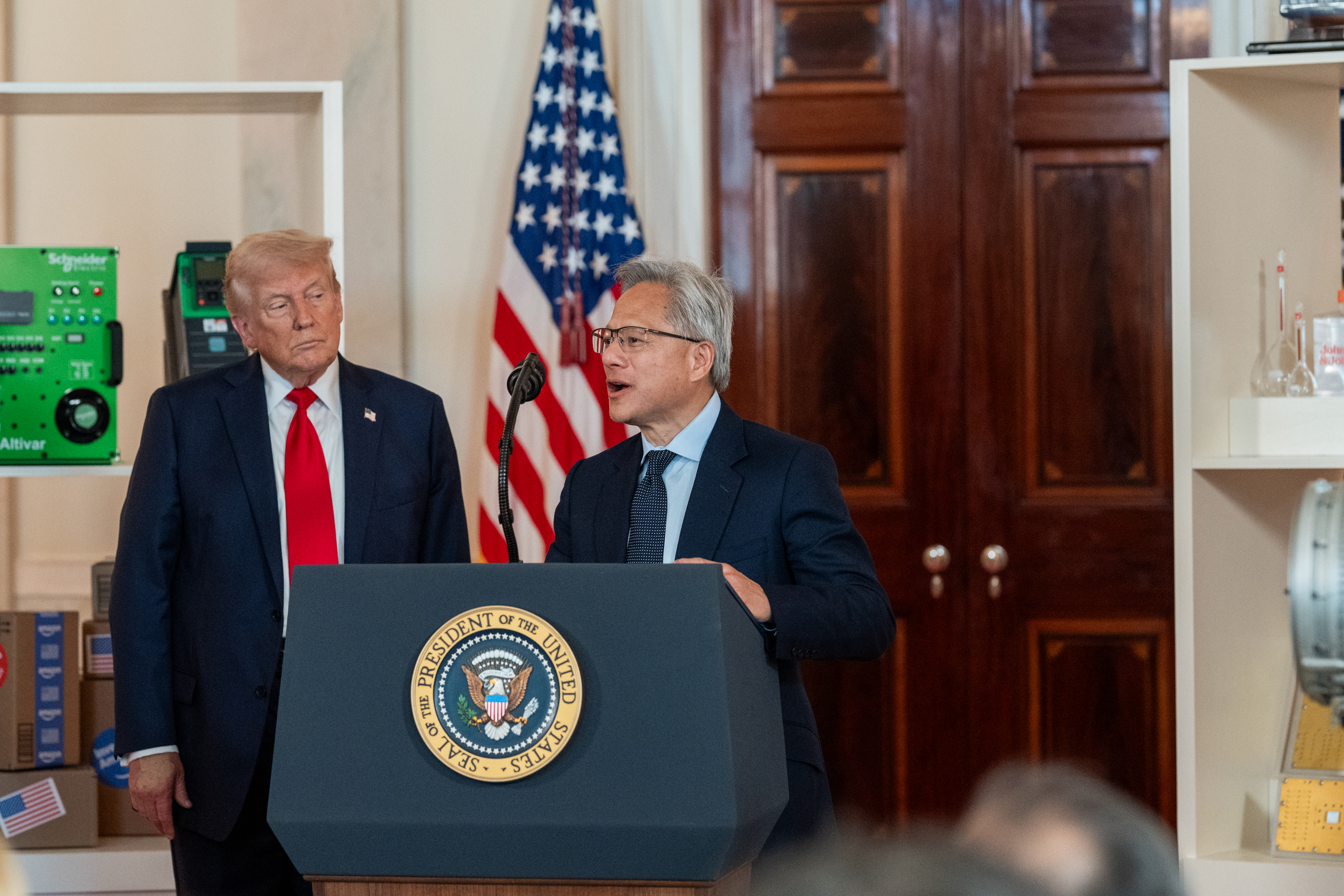
Jensen Huang (right) and President Donald Trump (left) in April 2025

Jensen Huang had been a major force in shaping the Trump administration's AI policy, lobbying against strict export controls so Nvidia could maximize global chip sales, including to China, while dismissing national security and AI extinction warnings. Major Nvidia customers like OpenAI and Anthropic have favored tighter chip export restrictions to slow down Chinese competitors. Bipartisan national security figures (such as Vivek Chilukuri of the Center for a New American Security) and members of Trump's cabinet—including Secretary of State Marco Rubio and Treasury Secretary Scott Bessent—argued that national security should trump Nvidia's corporate profits and pushed for tighter chip restrictions.

Figures like Steve Bannon had protested Huang's influence for over a year, labeling him an "agent of influence of the Chinese Communist Party" and calling for him to be arrested. Huang had developed a close relationship with Trump after meeting him at a donors' dinner at Mar-a-Lago. According to the Times, Nvidia later donated at least $20 million to the fund for the White House State Ballroom. Trump had previously refused to take actions that would disrupt Nvidia's sales—which had been bolstering the economy—or the United States's trade relationship with China. At a Halloween party at Mar-a-Lago, Trump stated that he wanted Huang to remain on the President's Council of Advisors on Science and Technology, describing Huang as "very above board".

=== Megaspeed and Alice Huang ===
Near the end of Donald Trump's first presidency, a growing number of Chinese companies became domiciled in Singapore, a practice termed "Singapore washing" which has since accelerated, spreading to various sectors from critical minerals to tech and biotechnology. With 28 free trade agreements, Singapore was considered a good base to grow markets outside China. Megaspeed, a Singaporean data center firm, was incorporated in 2015 as 7Road International, owned by 7Road Holdings, a Chinese investment holding company involved in the video game industry.

It grew substantially after President Joe Biden imposed export restrictions on the sale of artificial intelligence hardware to China in October 2022. 7Road International changed its name to Megaspeed International in March 2023. The Chinese split off the resulting company, which was sold to Huang Le Limited. In October 2023, Huang Le ended an eight-month tenure as managing director of Megaspeed, when the company was sold to a Singaporean company owned by Tan Yong Pong, who became Megaspeed's chief executive. Four days after the sale, Megaspeed became an Nvidia Cloud Partner.

On November 17, 2026, The Information reported, citing three people with direct knowledge of the matter, that Nvidia's sales team had twice introduced Alibaba to Alice Huang in 2022, months before the United States began restricting exports of advanced AI chips to China. Two of the people said the introductions helped her land Alibaba as a customer for a chip-renting business that became Megaspeed, and then obtain bank loans to buy Nvidia chips; one said that after the restrictions began, Nvidia sales employees again suggested to Alibaba that Megaspeed could rent it the chips from Southeast Asia, which the rules at the time did not prohibit. The Information called Nvidia's role the latest sign that, under Jensen Huang, the company had helped Chinese companies obtain its chips as a way around U.S. export rules; an Nvidia spokesman said the company "works across the industry to comply with the evolving rules regarding cloud services".

By 2025, Megaspeed faced a U.S. probe for allegedly diverting Nvidia chips used for AI. In February 2025, Singapore's police and customs authorities opened an investigation into several companies and their key officers, including Megaspeed and its controllers, over possible false declarations relating to the purchase of servers; Alice Huang was investigated because of her position as Megaspeed's then chief executive, chairperson and one of its key controllers.

On October 9, 2025, The New York Times reported that Commerce Department officials were investigating whether Megaspeed was helping companies in China evade U.S. export restrictions, and that one of its executives, Alice Huang, had socialized with Jensen Huang. Tripp Mickle, one of the story's reporters, said on The Daily on November 10, 2026, that the Megaspeed reporting began in August 2025, when he and Ana Swanson received a message from a technology-industry contact, whom he did not name, urging them to look into the company. The Wall Street Journal reported that Jensen Huang was introduced to Alice Huang by Kang Wei, a Chinese businessman whom Jensen had known for a decade; the Journal also reported that Kang is Alice Huang's husband, and that for two years he appeared to accept his wife's romantic relationship with Jensen Huang and spoke openly of their closeness.

On November 16, the Journal reported, from a review of Chinese public records, that between 2021 and 2024 Kang had built a network of government-backed data centers in China with proposed investment of more than US$9 billion, centered on a Shanghai company, Century Longteng, that signed a framework agreement with Huawei in early 2022. The Journal wrote that the records do not establish that China directed Megaspeed's purchases of Nvidia chips or that those chips reached data centers linked to Kang.

On November 18, The New York Times reported that Megaspeed had bought more than US$4 billion of Nvidia chips and, citing three people familiar with the relationship, that Alibaba was its customer and financial backer. The Times reported that in 2023, while pitching investors in Shanghai on an AI business in Southeast Asia, Alice Huang and Kang had said Jensen Huang would guarantee it a supply of chips. According to five people familiar with the project, Megaspeed's subsidiary SpeedMatrix ran Nvidia chips for Alibaba at a data center built by YTL in Johor, Malaysia.

The Times also reported that Alibaba had co-founded Zhejiang Lab, an AI laboratory it described as having strong ties to China's military, and said it was unclear whether chips supplied by Megaspeed had reached the lab. Alibaba called suggestions that it provided services to the military groundless, and Megaspeed's chief executive said the matter was under independent review and the company had reached no conclusions. In December 2023, Jensen Huang and Alice Huang, a Chinese executive at Megaspeed, were photographed in the company of each other at a restaurant in Singapore. The two were seen together in June 2024 and again in May 2025, when they left a group dinner in Taipei in the same car.

== Espionage allegations ==
On October 29, 2026, The New York Times reported, citing people briefed on the surveillance, that U.S. officials had concluded that Alice Huang was a Chinese intelligence asset passing information to China, and that electronic surveillance of her had revealed her close relationship with Jensen Huang, who was identified through the unmasking process; he did not receive a defensive briefing. Later reporting said Huang was not told about the intelligence regarding Alice Huang by government officials for unknown reasons. Mickle said that little had followed the October 2025 story, and that the reporting on the surveillance began about a month before the November 10 episode, after the paper's national-security reporters in Washington started hearing about Alice Huang.

On November 6, 2026, The New York Times reported that according to people briefed on the intelligence, a memo had circulated among top U.S. officials that Alice Huang was a spy for China's Ministry of State Security (MSS). On November 7, 2026, the Financial Times reported that the U.S. government believed Jensen Huang's relationship with Alice Huang was romantic, and that the United States Intelligence Community believed Alice Huang was recruited by the MSS. American diplomat James Andrew Lewis has described the MSS as the largest and most active intelligence agency in the world, with an estimated 600,000 employees, and has largely focused on overseas Chinese nationals in its operations.

On November 12, CNN reported, citing multiple sources, that the intelligence collected on Alice Huang to date did not prove that she had acted as a spy for China, and that U.S. officials disagreed about the strength of the evidence that she had been recruited by the MSS. According to CNN's sources, some officials in the Office of the Director of National Intelligence, including those close to director Jay Clayton, regarded the characterization of her as a Chinese spy as not entirely accurate and overstated; one source said officials at the Central Intelligence Agency (CIA) were not yet convinced that the intelligence, including intercepted communications, showed she had knowingly passed information to China.

According to CNN, some officials believed she nonetheless posed a clear counterintelligence risk, because China's national security law can oblige citizens to assist with intelligence-gathering. Others argued that attention to her Chinese government ties was distracting from Washington's failure to stop advanced technology reaching China. CNN also reported that the Federal Bureau of Investigation (FBI)'s counterintelligence investigation was continuing.

The next day, The New York Times reported that several people who had seen the underlying intelligence said it showed Alice Huang working with the MSS and that, according to people briefed on it, she appeared to be an "asset" who supplied information covertly, not a trained intelligence officer. According to the Times, U.S. intelligence agencies were confident in what they knew of her contacts with Chinese intelligence but had yet to establish when she began working with the MSS, whether she did so willingly or under coercion, how far China directed her and how much she passed on; she had been under surveillance for well over a year, and her relationship with Jensen Huang predated it. Current and former U.S. officials told the Times that Chinese executives often see alignment with the state as necessary to their careers and may feel unable to refuse a government request for information.

=== Rubio's memo ===
The New York Times reported on November 8 that Secretary of State and National Security Advisor Marco Rubio had drafted a highly classified memo in spring 2026 warning of Huang's relationship, which was circulated to government officials with high-level security clearances before Trump's visit to China in May 2026, which Huang joined. According to the Times on November 9, President Donald Trump had been briefed on the alleged spying in October 2025, but chose not to take action. Later reporting by the Times said the memo was dated March 30, and was sent to several cabinet secretaries.

On November 13, CNN reported that U.S. intelligence had intercepted communications in the spring of 2026 indicating that a Megaspeed executive was having an affair with a U.S. person, and that officials requested that the person's identity be unmasked, revealing Jensen Huang. According to CNN's sources, Rubio then drafted a memo summarizing the intelligence and shared it with a very small group of senior U.S. officials, including at the White House, so that officials dealing with Huang would be aware of the relationship. CNN reported that the memo was not drafted specifically for Trump, but that he was briefed on the subject on multiple occasions, including by Rubio aboard Air Force One in May 2026 on the way to Alaska, where Huang joined the presidential trip to China.

The Times had first reported the Air Force One briefing on November 10; Trump had said on November 9 that he had not heard about the matter at the time of the trip, and the White House disputed the Times report without elaborating. The Times also reported that Rubio briefed Trump after learning Huang was invited to the presidential trip to China, but that Trump was not particularly moved by the briefing. On November 13, The Washington Post reported, citing one person familiar with the matter, that Rubio's memo was based on a CIA report that he had recast "in his own more assertive terms". The Post described the memo as warning Trump, whereas the Times and CNN reported that it was not intended for him.

== Additional affairs and Huang's resignation ==
On October 29, after The New York Times story was published, Huang told Bloomberg News that Nvidia's dealings with Megaspeed were "completely normal and not unusual" and that Nvidia had checked to confirm that Megaspeed was not bringing AI chips to China. After the Financial Times reported that U.S. officials believed his relationship with Alice Huang was romantic, Nvidia general counsel Tim Teter went to Huang's home that night and asked whether the report was true; Huang said it was. The Information wrote that the report sent Huang into "crisis mode". His daughter Madison Huang, who had returned just after arriving in South Korea to attend an AI event and meet dignitaries, was by his side as he weighed how to respond; The Information reported that she advised her father he would probably need his own publicist, anticipating that he could not rely on one who represented Nvidia if the company parted ways with him.

On November 8, Jensen Huang sent an apology to Nvidia employees admitting to marital infidelity in a note addressed to "my colleagues at Nvidia". Huang did not name the other party in the affair. Nvidia also opened an investigation into him. The Information reported that the board had been reluctant to act, some directors having known Huang for decades, and that Teter had to urge it to open the investigation. The board said on November 8 that it had no reason to believe national security or Nvidia secrets had been compromised. The company hired New York-based law firm Wachtell, Lipton, Rosen & Katz for the investigation. On November 10, Nvidia's directors said that former acting U.S. attorney Joon H. Kim and the firm would conduct the investigation. Huang maintained to senior Nvidia executives Alice Huang was his only infidelity; The Information wrote that "Had that been the case, perhaps he would have made it through the maelstrom". The following days, he received texts and calls of encouragement from friends including Tesla and SpaceX's Elon Musk, OpenAI's Sam Altman and Larry Fink. Donald Trump also called Jensen Huang urging him to fight for his job. Huang told many of his allies that Alice Huang was not a spy, only a business customer, and the Times reported that some allies "began to make plans to turn the tide".

On November 11, The New York Times reported, citing five Nvidia employees who spoke on condition of anonymity, that Huang had also had an extramarital relationship with Kimberly Powell, Nvidia's vice president of health care, who reported to him. Such a relationship is prohibited by Nvidia's code of conduct. On the same day, The Wall Street Journal reported that Nvidia's board was preparing to remove Huang as chief executive. The board held an emergency meeting to discuss Huang's future at the company, with some members joining remotely. According to The Information, the news about Powell prompted the board to call the meeting. The same day, Nvidia's board accepted Huang's resignation as president, chief executive and director, effective immediately. On November 12, Nvidia announced that Huang had resigned as president, chief executive officer and a director, effective immediately. Colette Kress was appointed interim chief executive while retaining her roles as executive vice president and chief financial officer. Reuters reported, citing one source, that Kress knew about Huang's relationship with Powell. According to The Wall Street Journal and Reuters, Kress had questioned some of Huang's financing deals in the months before his resignation; the Journal reported that at an August meeting Huang belittled Kress, calling her "a deer in the headlights". The board also appointed Harvey C. Jones as its first chair and began a search for a permanent chief executive. On November 12, Reuters reported that Huang had an "intimate relationship" with a second female employee of Nvidia. On November 13, Bloomberg News reported that Huang, known for his extreme attention to detail and decisive mentality, had seemingly "given up" just before his resignation. According to the report, Huang started taking longer to reply to emails from Nvidia employees and began to use phrases like "whatever" and "I don't care." Huang called himself "a piece of shit", and said that he no longer cared what happened to him. Huang said he was most concerned about his wife, Lori, and not "ruining the lives" of the women he had affairs with.

On November 15, the Financial Times reported that Huang was considering a comeback as Nvidia's CEO and had discussed the possibility of returning with confidants. It reported that one ally said they were putting together a "war room" of Silicon Valley executives to lobby for his return and to seek support from the White House, an effort the ally said had Huang's support. On November 16, CNBC, The Wall Street Journal and the BBC reported that the board was not considering reinstating Huang; CNBC's source said it was focused on its investigation of him. The board had said on November 13 that it was hiring an executive search firm and had not yet engaged any candidates. On November 17, Huang said in a statement posted on X that he had made "serious mistakes" in his personal life, that he was committed to cooperating with the board's independent investigation, and that he would be "honored" to return as chief executive if the board decided this was in the best interest of shareholders, employees, the company and the United States. Opening Nvidia's third-quarter earnings call that afternoon, board chair Harvey Jones said that the board "does not intend to reinstate" Huang as chief executive and had retained Heidrick & Struggles to lead the search for a permanent one, which would consider internal and external candidates; he said the board would not take questions on the circumstances of Huang's resignation or the ongoing investigation. Semafor reported that evening, citing people familiar with the matter, that three directors were pushing for Huang's return, and that Huang had discussed it with at least one director before his statement. At an all-hands meeting on November 18, Kress told employees to move forward and Jones discussed the search for a new chief executive; CNBC's sources differed on whether the employees present wanted Huang back. Kress told staff they could expect pay raises and more equity in December, months ahead of schedule, and Jones said the board had accepted Huang's resignation because of his personal conduct and "lack of candor". On November 20, President Trump said he "would love to see Jensen be given a second chance. You know we’re a country of second chances" and added "I’d like to see Jensen make a big apology and go back".

== Commerce Department's relationship with Nvidia ==
The United States began investigating Megaspeed and Alice Huang in 2024. In September 2024, an official from the United States Department of Commerce's Bureau of Industry and Security (BIS) visited Megaspeed's data center in Malaysia and found Nvidia equipment still packed in boxes, suggesting it was being shipped in or out rather than installed; U.S. officials then conveyed their concerns about Megaspeed to Singaporean and Malaysian authorities and to Nvidia.

In August 2025, BIS agents investigating Megaspeed received an email from Tim Teter, Nvidia's general counsel, saying that Jeffrey I. Kessler, the under secretary of commerce for industry and security, had given Nvidia permission to reach out about the case, which alarmed the agents. According to a Commerce Department official, the agents declined Nvidia's request for a meeting and forwarded the email chain to Kessler, who told them to continue handling the case strictly by the book. According to officials, the case was transferred to the United States Department of Justice later in 2025 to avoid any potential compromise of the investigation, with the Commerce Department pausing its work at the Justice Department's request; the Justice Department is conducting a criminal inquiry into Megaspeed.

On November 16, the Commerce and Justice departments said in a joint statement that Commerce had opened its investigation of Megaspeed in 2024; that in May 2025 its investigators had asked Nvidia for records of direct or indirect sales to the company, and Nvidia had put Megaspeed on its "no sell" list in June; that Commerce agents, working with Singaporean law enforcement, had interviewed Alice Huang during an on-site check at Megaspeed that month; and that the Justice Department had then taken the lead in a criminal investigation.

The New York Times described the statement as an apparent response to criticism that Lutnick had been slow to investigate Megaspeed, and reported that trade records showed Megaspeed's Malaysian subsidiary had continued to receive large shipments of Nvidia technology for eight months after the no-sell listing, including more than US$800 million of export-controlled technology, mostly through third-party server makers; Nvidia said the department had permitted it to ship some repair parts after it imposed the block.

In November 2026, following revelations of Jensen Huang's affairs, reporting also focused on U.S. Secretary of Commerce Howard Lutnick's ties with Nvidia. The New York Times reported that within the Commerce Department, matters related to Nvidia were treated specially, with Lutnick having frequent calls with Jensen Huang. It added that all matters related to Nvidia were routed through Kessler, who was said to rarely take significant action without Lutnick's approval. It reported that Lutnick had slowed down many measures to restrict exports of advanced Nvidia chips to China. People cited by the Times said that Trump was more often than not the official most sympathetic to Lutnick's position and wanted good relations with Chinese leader Xi Jinping; the Commerce Department denied that Trump's relationship with Huang had chilled its actions, calling the idea "false and reckless".

The Times reported that Treasury Secretary Bessent had confronted Lutnick at the White House on November 5, 2026, over why sales of advanced chips to Megaspeed had not been banned, and that Lutnick replied that the department could now move quickly to restrict the company; a Commerce Department spokeswoman denied that the conversation had taken place. Axios, citing six sources, reported that Trump had approved action against suspected diversions of Nvidia chips to China on at least three occasions, in May, in August and on November 5, 2026, but that Lutnick and Kessler resisted pressure to move forward; at the November 5 meeting, Lutnick warned that the controls would start a trade war with China.

=== Reactions ===
Continued chip sales to Megaspeed raised questions on whether Lutnick should remain in the role, with Reuters reporting on November 12 that U.S. officials were considering whether he should be ousted. Lutnick also sparked significant criticism from Republican and Democratic members of the U.S. Congress.

On November 13, Bessent accused the Commerce Department of inaction, saying on CNBC's Squawk Box that several agencies "were in favor of putting Megaspeed on the entity list for months" but that the decision rested with the BIS: "you will have to ask them about their internal process". He added that "the story has been thus far on Jensen Huang's personal foibles. The real story here should be: Did Nvidia know their client, and was there a robust effort at Nvidia to make sure that there was no leakage and that they were selling to what were obviously pass-through shell companies? And I think it's important that anyone at the company there be held accountable for that."

On November 16, the Commerce Department's Bureau of Industry and Security released an interim final rule to stop Chinese companies from using advanced U.S. chips remotely through data centers in other countries. It requires export licenses for advanced chips sent to Singapore, Malaysia, Thailand, Indonesia and Brazil, with an exemption for U.S. companies, and gives overseas data centers that supply significant computing power to companies headquartered in China 90 days to obtain licenses. The bureau's announcement said the Treasury Department and the National Security Council had written the rule and directed its release.

The rule was published in the Federal Register on November 19 and took effect that day. Reuters reported that the rule came in the wake of the scandal and amid scrutiny of whether the department had done enough to keep sensitive technology from China, and NPR that the administration had resisted such regulation before the scandal. According to Politico, the policy was pushed through by Bessent and supported by Rubio.

Trump said on November 16 that he had no plans to replace Lutnick, who was accompanying him to Asia. Regarding Lutnick and Bessent, he said "One wants to be friendly with China, and one wants to have a blowup with China" and added "We're having a very good relationship with China right now, and I understand both sides of it. And I'll make a decision, but I understand very well both sides", while saying Lutnick is "doing a very good job". On November 20, Treasury Secretary Bessent said no further restrictions on exports of older chips to China were necessary, saying "The proper chip restrictions are in place, and the remote access has been curtailed."

On November 17, Nvidia announced that its board had established a standing National Security and Export Control Oversight Committee, chaired by director Suzanne Nora Johnson and including directors Stephen Neal and John Dabiri. The company's national security and global trade compliance teams will report to the committee and to interim CEO Colette Kress. Bloomberg News reported that the move followed a controversy over chip smuggling during the tenure of former CEO Jensen Huang, and that Trump, asked about the committee that day, called it "a great idea".

== Responses ==
=== Trump administration ===
On November 9, CIA director John Ratcliffe and Director of National Intelligence Jay Clayton gave congressional leaders a classified briefing which, according to House Democratic leader Hakeem Jeffries, discussed Nvidia only briefly and focused mostly on Iran; Jeffries called for a full briefing on Nvidia. The same day, President Donald Trump stated that the FBI was investigating Huang's affair. After Huang's resignation was announced, Trump wrote in a post on Truth Social that Huang had "done a fantastic job" and that "there is only one man to take his place – Tim Cook of Apple. A Legend replaces a Legend!".

On November 12, United States Attorney General Todd Blanche said "There's no conclusions reached by the Department of Justice or by me or by [FBI] Director [Kash] Patel around who she is or is not" and stated that Alice Huang being a spy is "something I have never said and that I don't know to be true. So you assumed that DoJ learns that she is in fact a spy. Nobody said that. I certainly haven't said that". On the same day, Trump said the developments were "horrible" and "sad", mentioning that the U.S. would be in "bad shape" if it lost its edge in the AI race against China.

Also that day, when Stephen A. Smith asked whether Huang should have resigned, Trump said, "The big thing is, was the woman a spy, and I don't know if that's been determined yet", adding, "But if the woman was a spy, yes. If the woman was not a spy perhaps it would be different." That evening, David Sacks, co-chair of the President's Council of Advisors on Science and Technology, wrote on X, citing CNN's report, that "the spy narrative is collapsing already", asked "Is there clear & convincing evidence that Alice Huang was a Chinese spy?" and said of the leaks that "An investigation should be opened"; the post gave his reading of the reporting and was not an administration intelligence assessment.

On November 13, unnamed United States officials said Trump was not expected to raise the issue of Alice Huang when he was due to meet Chinese leader Xi Jinping the following week on the sidelines of APEC China 2026 in Shenzhen. On November 15, Bessent said on Fox News's Sunday Morning Futures that Nvidia's board should look outside the company for its next leader, adding: "That—just what was going on inside the company—they need a dramatic shakeup". He also said that the U.S. Congress does not need to pass legislation to tighten control of chip exports to China, saying "I don't think we need the legislation. We have all the rules we need. We just need them enforced".

On November 16, Trump told reporters that he would not mind seeing Huang return as chief executive, saying he thought Huang had learned "a big lesson". He said national security "was not put at risk, and our country is now stronger than ever before, and you know China plays games with us, and we play games with China" and cast doubt on whether Alice Huang was a spy, saying "Usually, what happens with that is that any woman coming to the country that's a beautiful woman that comes from China, they say she's a spy. I don't know that she was a spy at all".

In a Fox News interview from Shenzhen, where he was attending the APEC summit, Trump said he had referred to Huang's resignation only briefly while seated next to Xi at a dinner, calling it a tragedy. He said he would like Nvidia's board to reinstate Huang and that he did not believe the episode posed a threat to national security, and said of espionage between the two countries: "We spy on China. They spy on us." On November 19, the day Trump and Xi held talks in Shenzhen, Trump told Fox News that he had not talked much with Xi about Nvidia or about Huang's relationship with Alice Huang.

On November 17, The Wall Street Journal reported, citing people familiar with the matter, that the U.S. Securities and Exchange Commission (SEC) was investigating Nvidia, including whether its disclosures had misled investors; the SEC declined to comment. On November 20, Reuters and The New York Times reported, citing people briefed on the matter, that the investigation was examining Nvidia's accounting; the Times said the inquiry was at an early stage and might not lead to civil charges, and that it was unclear whether it was related to Alice Huang. Both reported that Nvidia had begun reporting its sales by customers' headquarters rather than by billing location, which removed Singapore from its geographic breakdown; the Times said the switch came after its October 2025 report on Megaspeed, and Nvidia had said the change would better reflect where its revenue came from. The SEC declined to comment, and Nvidia did not respond to requests for comment.

=== United States Congress ===
Florida representative Brian Mast, the chair of the United States House Committee on Foreign Affairs; Michigan representative John Moolenaar, the chair of the United States House Select Committee on Strategic Competition between the United States and the Chinese Communist Party; and Arkansas representative Rick Crawford, the chair of the United States House Permanent Select Committee on Intelligence, all members of the Republican Party, requested that Huang appear before a closed-door briefing in November 2026. On November 7, Delaware senator Chris Coons of the Democratic Party, who is set to chair the Senate Committee on Foreign Relations, pledged to open an investigation on the "insane relationship between the Trump Administration, Chinese spies, and AI billionaires".

In an interview on November 11, Congressman Jim Himes of the Democratic Party, the likely incoming chair of the United States House Permanent Select Committee on Intelligence, said that a classified briefing earlier that week had left him unsure whether Alice Huang had knowingly gathered information for the Chinese government. He stated that when he directly asked Jay Clayton and John Ratcliffe whether a counterintelligence investigation had commenced at the FBI, "they didn't know."

On November 12, Republican senator Tim Scott of South Carolina wrote to Jensen Huang and Commerce Secretary Howard Lutnick seeking their testimony before the Senate Banking Committee; Huang was asked to appear voluntarily on December 3 and warned that the committee could issue a subpoena. Lutnick agreed to testify; according to a U.S. official cited by CBS News, his appearance was set for December 10. Scott said on CNBC on November 18 that Huang had also agreed to appear and that he hoped both men would testify before Christmas; he had asked Huang to appear at a public hearing rather than for a closed-door interview.

The House committees had threatened to subpoena Huang if he did not comply with their requests. On November 15, Moolenaar said on CBS's Face the Nation that Huang and representatives of Nvidia had agreed to a closed-door interview with the three House committees and that a subpoena would not be needed; a date had not been set. In the same interview, Moolenaar said that Huang's relationship with Alice Huang had been irresponsible, given that "every Chinese national can be pressured by the Chinese Communist Party", and that there "need to be questions answered by Howard Lutnick, by the entire Commerce Department". On November 17, the three committees' chairs announced that Huang had agreed to a transcribed interview on December 1 and that Nvidia's general counsel, Tim Teter, would appear on December 2; they said they looked forward to hearing from both "on their roles in a potential breach of our national security".

On November 17, Representatives Jamie Raskin and Gregory Meeks, the ranking Democrats on the House Judiciary Committee and the Foreign Affairs Committee, wrote to Cantor Fitzgerald, the firm Lutnick led until he handed control to his sons in 2025, seeking documents on its Nvidia holdings and on any discussion of Lutnick's or Trump's financial exposure to Nvidia; they said they sought to learn whether his decisions on export controls might have been "improperly influenced" by the firm's holdings or business interests. Cantor said it held no material proprietary position in Nvidia and that most of its holdings hedged equity swaps executed for clients, and the Commerce Department said Lutnick had complied with his ethics agreement, including its divestiture and recusal requirements. On November 18, Brett Guthrie, the Republican chair of the House Energy and Commerce Committee, asked Kress and the Commerce Department for briefings by December 2 on Nvidia's alleged role in helping Chinese companies obtain its chips.

On November 19, the House Foreign Affairs Committee released confidential licensing information showing that, as of May 11, the Commerce Department had approved the sale of more than 800,000 advanced AI chips to Chinese companies for the year, including several on a Pentagon list of Chinese military companies, and 75,000 for Alibaba. It also showed that Nvidia had applied in April to sell more than 40,000 H200 chips to New Century Lettall Data Service, which The New York Times described as part of a network of Chinese companies with ties to Megaspeed and Alice Huang. Nvidia said that despite receiving some licenses, it had since stopped shipping H200 chips to China; the Commerce Department did not respond to the Times and has said it closely follows national security regulations. The committee planned hearings in December with Lutnick and Kessler.

=== California ===
On November 19, California Attorney General Rob Bonta served an investigative subpoena on Nvidia in connection with the reports of Jensen Huang's affair with Alice Huang. His office said it was asking whether Nvidia's advanced chips or confidential information may have gone to China and whether the company had misled investors and the public, and that the information would help it assess whether Nvidia had violated California law.

=== Megaspeed ===
On November 12, Megaspeed said it had cooperated with the United States Bureau of Industry and Security and was prepared to cooperate with other United States government authorities. The company said it had hired a U.S. law firm to review its chip holdings and export controls. On November 15, Megaspeed said that Alice Huang had officially left the company on August 30, 2025, and had no current role there. It also said it "is aware of recent media reports containing assertions about our business, supply chain and global operations that are not supported by verifiable evidence", that it had conducted "legitimate and lawful business", and that it had retained outside counsel to conduct an internal investigation.

=== China ===
The Chinese government rejected allegations of an espionage operation targeting Nvidia CEO Jensen Huang. On October 30, Ministry of Foreign Affairs spokesperson Guo Jiakun said the Times report was "based on groundless speculation and is nothing more than an attempt to smear China"; on November 9, the ministry called the spy allegations "pure fabrication out of thin air". Chinese media has largely focused on Huang admitting to infidelity. Some Chinese state media reports have claimed that The New York Times report was aimed at destabilizing United States–China relations.

Chinese Communist Party-owned tabloid newspaper Global Times claimed the investigation into Nvidia CEO Jensen Huang may be a political witch hunt designed to undermine him rather than a genuine national security concern, saying "Whenever China-US relations begin to improve, there are often those firing shots from the shadows". Hu Xijin, the former editor-in-chief of Global Times, said the leak was "a calculated move by the Democratic Party and the U.S. establishment to take down Jensen Huang, and by extension, go after Trump". As of November 9, Huang's admission of infidelity had drawn more than 40 million views on Weibo, while the title "Jensen Huang's 41-Year Loyal Husband Persona Falls Apart" became its top trending topic.

=== Singapore ===
According to Singapore's Ministry of Home Affairs, the Singapore Police Force and Singapore Customs opened an investigation in February 2025 into several companies and their key officers, including Megaspeed and its controllers, over possible false declarations in the purchase of servers. In October 2025, the police confirmed that Megaspeed was under investigation for "suspected breaches of our domestic laws", amid allegations that it was aiding Chinese companies in evading curbs on the export of U.S. chips.

On November 12, 2026, the ministry said that Alice Huang had been investigated as Megaspeed's then chief executive, chair and one of its key controllers, but not for espionage. On June 24, 2025, the day the U.S. Bureau of Industry and Security carried out a post-shipment verification check at Megaspeed with her present, Singapore police interviewed her and impounded her passport.

In February 2026, the Singaporean police, in consultation with the Attorney-General's Chambers, concluded that there was insufficient evidence to establish that she had committed any offenses relating to the possible inaccurate declarations for which Megaspeed was being investigated, but assessed that she had knowingly given them inaccurate information to downplay her role in Megaspeed; she was issued a stern warning and barred from re-entering Singapore. Her passport was returned on February 26, 2026, and she left Singapore the same day. The ministry said that its investigations into Megaspeed and six other individuals were continuing, and that Singapore had received limited information or assistance from United States authorities in securing the cooperation of the server supplier Supermicro.

On October 30, 2026, The Wall Street Journal reported, citing unnamed people, that authorities in Singapore and Taiwan had separately investigated Alice Huang's ties to China and that officials involved suspected she had been recruited by Chinese intelligence. The next day, the Ministry of Home Affairs said that neither the Singaporean government nor its officials had said this, and that no such investigation of Alice Huang had been conducted. On November 14, the Journal again reported that officials in Singapore suspected she had been recruited by Chinese intelligence after she grew close to Jensen Huang.

=== Malaysia ===
On November 13, Malaysia's Ministry of Investment, Trade and Industry said that it was working with the Royal Malaysian Customs Department to investigate whether any chips brought into Malaysia by SpeedMatrix, a Malaysian subsidiary of Megaspeed, were re-exported to other countries without a permit and whether SpeedMatrix gave false information to Malaysia's Customs Department.

=== Other reactions ===
By November 9, Nvidia's market capitalization had fallen by about US$1.5 trillion from its October 6 peak, a decline The Wall Street Journal attributed to the investigation into Huang and broader jitters in the AI industry. Investors filed a class action lawsuit against Nvidia and Jensen Huang, accusing them of fraud for concealing Huang's ties with a suspected Chinese spy.

On November 18, Moody's Ratings lowered its outlook on Nvidia's Aa1 credit rating to stable from positive, citing governance concerns after Huang's departure; its analyst wrote that the exit had introduced uncertainty about the company's strategy and financial policies and that government investigations could distract management, while calling Nvidia's market leadership and financial position exceptionally strong.

On November 20, Nvidia's shares fell nearly 14 percent, their worst day since January 2025, with losses deepening after Reuters reported that the SEC's investigation was examining the company's accounting; it was the company's worst week since October 2008 and the worst week for chip stocks since 2001, and by that day's close Nvidia had lost about US$2.7 trillion in market value since its October 6 peak.

On November 12, a Denny's restaurant in San Jose removed a commemorative plaque, installed in 2023, that marks the booth where Huang and his co-founders discussed the idea that became Nvidia. On November 13, the company said it was reinstalling the plaque, noting that Huang had started at Denny's as a dishwasher. Huang's work for the chain had been in Oregon, where he got his first job, at 15, at a Denny's in Portland.

Many Silicon Valley executives and investors publicly backed Huang after his resignation, arguing that Nvidia could not replace him and that his departure would cost the United States ground in artificial intelligence; several criticized the board for giving in to pressure. Elon Musk offered to hire him. Palmer Luckey called his ousting a mistake. An open letter titled "Stand With Jensen", posted online as a petition, asked the board to reinstate Huang during an independent investigation. It had nearly 100,000 signatures by November 14, including those of some current and former Nvidia employees, and more than 178,000 by November 16, though the campaign's website said signatories' affiliations were self-reported and unverified.

The Wall Street Journal reported that some people whose names appeared on it, including prominent Nvidia employees, said they had not signed it. Elon Musk, Replit CEO Amjad Masad and Epic Games CEO Tim Sweeney were listed among its signatories. Investors Gavin Baker of Atreides Management and Brad Gerstner of Altimeter Capital Management separately urged the board not to rush to replace Huang and to keep all options open, including his return. According to the BBC, Jensen Huang's reinstatement would face scrutiny in Washington, where Treasury Secretary Scott Bessent had said Nvidia should look outside the company for its next chief executive.

On November 16, The Verge reported that a theory that the scandal resulted from a plot against Huang was spreading among technology executives, citing posts by David Sacks, Sweeney and Masad that questioned the reporting on Alice Huang and the timing of the resignation. On November 17, Gizmodo wrote that some of these skeptics had gone further, suggesting the ouster was a plot by frontier AI labs such as Anthropic; it called this a conspiracy theory and said its proponents had offered little evidence for it.

== See also ==
- Artificial Intelligence Cold War
- Chinese espionage in the United States
- Removal of Sam Altman from OpenAI
- Supermicro chip export case
- Voiceverse NFT plagiarism scandal
