= Shengqu Games =

Chinese online games company

- Type: Private
- Industry: Video games
- Founded: 1999; 27 years ago
- Headquarters: Shanghai, China
- Key people: Xiaoqiang Hou (CEO)
- Parent: Zhejiang Century Huatong
- Website: Shanda Games Online (Chinese)

Shengqu Games is a publisher and operator of online games based in Shanghai, China. Founded in 1999 as Shanda Interactive Entertainment Limited, it spun off from Shanda Interactive in 2009 and is currently owned by Zhejiang Century Huatong. Shanda's published and operated games include AION, MapleStory, The World of Legend, The Age, Magical Land, Ragnarok Online, Dungeons & Dragons Online, Crazy Arcade, GetAmped and Final Fantasy XIV (in mainland China) among others.

== History ==
Shanda Interactive Entertainment Limited was founded in December 1999 by Chen Tianqiao, Chrissy Luo, and Chen Danian. In September 2001, Shanda published its first game, The Legend of Mir 2 (热血传奇), which was licensed from a Korean company, WeMade Soft. In 2003, a dispute over profit sharing caused the relationship to fracture between Shanda and WeMade. No longer able to operate The Legend of Mir 2, Shanda developed the game The World of Legend (传奇世界), which began operation in June 2003. Shanda transferred all user data from The Legend of Mir 2 into the new game, promising its customers that their character, points, armors and weapons would remain the same. WeMade Entertainment deemed The World of Legend to be a copy of Mir 2 and sued Shanda for copyright infringement in October 2003. After a prolonged legal battle, the two companies reached a settlement on April 26, 2009. By October 2004, Shanda operated eight games and was the largest online game company in China, hosting 1.2 million simultaneous players.

By June 2008, Shanda Games Limited had become a business unit of Shanda Interactive. In 2009, Shanda Interactive spun off Shanda Games in the largest IPO in the United States that year under the ticker: GAME, raising US$1.04 billion. At the time, Shanda Games provided 77 percent of Shanda Interactive's revenue. Shanda Group founder Tianqiao Chen subsequently sold his stake in Shanda Games in 2014. In 2017, the Shanda Games brand was acquired by Zhejiang Century Huatong Group.

On March 30, 2019, following a buyout by Zhejiang Century Huatong Group, Shanda Games changed their name to Shengqu Games.

== Subsidiaries and sub-organization ==
"Aurora Technology" and "Eyedentity Games" are subsidiary of "Shengqu Games" company. "Actoz Soft" is a sub-organization.

== Products ==
=== Video games ===
- Bomb and Bubble
- Company of Heroes Online (MMO real-time strategy computer game)
- Chinese Heroes (online video game)
- Dragon Ball Online
- Dragon Nest
- Dungeons & Dragons Online
- Fallout Shelter Online
- Final Fantasy XIV Online
- GetAmped
- LaTale
- Magical Land
- MapleStory
- Ragnarok Online
- RWBY
- Shanda Rich Man
- Super Star, First Online Karaoke Game
- The Age
- The Legend of Mir 2 (licensed from WeMade Soft)
- The Sign
- The World of Legend
- Three Kingdoms
- Borderlands Online

=== Hardware ===
- Ez Station, game console
- Ez MINI, handheld game console

== See also ==
- Online gaming in China
- List of game companies in Singapore
- List of video game developers
- List of video game publishers
