= Kang Wei =

Chinese investor (born 1975)

- Born: January 1975 (age 51); Shanghai, China
- Citizenship: China
- Education: Shanghai Jiao Tong University
- Occupations: Technology executive, investor
- Employer: Hexi Capital
- Spouse: Alice Huang

Chinese name
- Simplified Chinese: 康伟
- Traditional Chinese: 康偉
- Hanyu Pinyin: Kāng Wěi

Kang Wei (Chinese: 康伟; born January 1975) is a Chinese investor who is the chairman of Shanghai Hexi Investment Management. After 2016, he and his wife Alice Huang invested in several fast-growing sectors such as games, pharmaceuticals, and cloud computing. Kang was penalized several times for violating securities regulations. In November 2026, he received attention due to Nvidia CEO Jensen Huang's extramarital affair with Alice Huang.

== Early life ==
Kang Wei was born in Shanghai in January 1975. He holds a bachelor's degree and graduated from Shanghai Jiao Tong University.

== Career ==
=== Early career and Zhonghai Trust ===
Kang worked in a public fund company in his early years. He served as the chief strategy analyst of Shenyin Wanguo Research Institute and the executive vice president and chief investment officer of Zhonghai Trust. In July 2006, Zhonghai Trust increased its capital in Guolian Fund (later renamed Zhonghai Fund) and became the largest shareholder. Kang was transferred to Zhonghai Fund as general manager and director of the investment committee.

At the age of 33, he set the record for the youngest general manager of a fund company in mainland China, which was later broken by Liu Pohong in 2010, who was 32 years old. In July 2009, Kang returned to Zhonghai Trust to continue serving as vice president, and left China Ocean Fund in September 2009. In May 2010, he resigned from Zhonghai Trust for personal reasons.

=== Hexi Capital ===
In July 2010, Shanghai Hexi Investment Management Corporation was founded. According to the official website, Hexi Investment is a secondary market private equity firm under Hexi Capital. Kang became chairman in January 2011. In April 2014, the company was approved to obtain the qualification of private fund manager. The company was originally mainly managed by Kang and his partner Zhu Xiaoming. In November 2015, Alice Huang became a core shareholder and senior executive, and all of her shares were transferred from Kang.

In March 2016, Huang and Shanghai Jiujin Investment (whose shareholders at the time were Kang and Li Yexi) jointly founded Shanghai Yunxi Investment Management Consulting Co., Ltd., with Huang as the legal representative, which was later changed to Huang Yu, Alice Huang's sister. Before Huang joined, Hexi Capital underwent a shareholding restructuring. After the adjustment, Kang Wei held 48.75% of the shares, Zhu Xiaoming held 26.25%, and Huang held 25%. All of her shares were transferred by Kang and held through Shanghai Yunxi Investment.

From 2016, Huang and Kang started co-running Hexi Capital. In the second half of 2017, Kang and Zhu Xiaoming had a conflict over profit sharing. In October 2017 Zhu resigned, and Hexi Capital was managed by Kang and Huang. In addition to Hexi Investment, Hexi Capital also has a private fund manager responsible for primary market M&A investment business, named Shanghai Feiye Investment Management Center.

Kang met Nvidia CEO Jensen Huang around 2016 and introduced Alice Huang to him. According to sources, Kang Wei seemed to accept Alice Huang's close relationship with Jensen Huang for about two years, and would even jokingly refer to Alice Huang as Jensen Huang's personal assistant to acquaintances.

=== Data centers ===
By 2020, Kang and Alice Huang were joint business partners in many ventures. They were also moving towards cloud computing. That year, they helped build and operate Yangtze River Delta Project, an AI computing centre in Shanghai for Tencent. In late 2021, Kang entered the data center business. He became an executive at Century Longteng at some point; the Century Huatong held a controlling 63% stake at Century Longteng, an investment vehicle for Hexi Capital held a 27% stake, while a Shanghai government body held a 10% stake.

In early 2022, Century Longteng signed a framework agreement with Huawei regarding cloud data centers, energy infrastructure and computing, with Kang joining the signing ceremony. In summer 2022, the company agreed to build a US$4.5 billion intelligent-computing industrial park in Wuhu, including eight data center buildings covering 380,000 square meters and including 24,000 server racks, and receiving support from the government as part of the "East Data, West Computing" project.

By April 2026, one data center covering 46,000 square meters was completed. In July 2024, the company agreed to a US$5 billion project in Liangshan, Sichuan, with Kang being present as the company's data services unit chairman. Century Longteng also registered a data project in Shenzhen. The Shenzhen data center was built for Huawei's cloud unit, with the project being awarded to a company controlled by Century Longteng in 2022.

Kang also worked with Huang in building Megaspeed. The Wall Street Journal reported Kang and Huang also planned several data centre projects from late 2024 to June 2025, including two in Southeast Asia and one in Shanghai, with the couple expressing confidence expecting to triple their money in three years and get Nvidia chips to China.

In early 2025, Huang and Kang sought investment worth several hundred million dollars for a Southeast Asia data center project, and told investors they had "no problem securing GPUs" and cited Alibaba Group as a partner for the project. Shanghai media reported that Kang was the president of the Yangtze River Delta Project, a data center in Shanghai. Bloomberg News reported that Kang is the president of the Yangtze River Delta Project, and his company Shanghai Hexi provided financial backing for the project.

On 10 March 2025, when Wang Huajie, secretary of the Chinese Communist Party (CCP) Songjiang District Committee of Shanghai visited the project, Kang accompanied him and attended the symposium. On 2 September 2025, Yunxi Investment changed its name to Shanghai Longteng Intelligent Computing Data Group Co., Ltd., and its business scope was changed to big data services, industrial Internet data services and other computing power-related businesses.

=== Securities law violations and enforcement actions ===
Between 2014 and 2015, Hexi Capital provided financing arrangements for Gu Guoping to acquire control of Huiqiu Technology through funds and equity swaps. Hexi Capital managed multiple fund accounts to buy Huiqiu Technology shares and actually participated in stock trading decisions. Gu Guoping was banned from the securities market for life by the China Securities Regulatory Commission (CRSC) in May 2017 for concealing the fact that he had become the actual controller of Huiqiu Technology. In January 2018, the CESC imposed a fine of ¥17.7 million renminbi on Hexi Capital and a fine of ¥400,000 renminbi on Kang Wei for failing to report his shareholding exceeding the limit and for buying and selling Huiqiu Technology shares during the restricted transfer period.

In 2020, Kang indirectly acquired 29.91% of the shares of Haoli Technology. In 2021, Tang Qiqing acquired 29.99% of the shares of Haoli Technology, and subsequently the company issued an announcement disclosing that Tang was the sole actual controller. However, the CSRC investigation found that Kang played an important role in Tang's acquisition of Haoli Technology; the CSRC determined that Kang and Tang constituted concerted action parties, and Kang was also one of the actual controllers of Haoli Technology. The two concealed their concerted action relationship and failed to cooperate with the listed company in fulfilling its information disclosure obligations. On 17 July 2025, the CSRC imposed a penalty, fining Kang ¥2.5 million renminbi and Tang ¥1.5 million renminbi.

In March 2023 and March 2024, Haoli Technology transferred its equity in Hefei Qusu Superdimensional Integrated Circuit Co., Ltd. to Shanghai Shuoju Technology Partnership. These two transactions were related-party transactions, but Haoli Technology failed to fulfill its review and disclosure obligations in accordance with the rules for related-party transactions. In August 2026, Haoli Technology and Kang received a warning letter from the Xiamen Securities Regulatory Bureau.

On 3 April 2024, the Asset Management Association of China issued a warning and penalty to Hexi Capital and Kang Wei for failing to properly preserve the investment decision-making and transaction-related materials of five private equity fund products, including the Hexi Hybrid No. 1 Fund.

Around the Chinese New Year of 2026, Kang was arrested by the Shanghai police for illegally manipulating stocks. He was released and was pictured at Stanford University with his friends.

== Personal life ==
Kang is married to tech executive and investor Alice Huang.
