= Howard Lutnick =

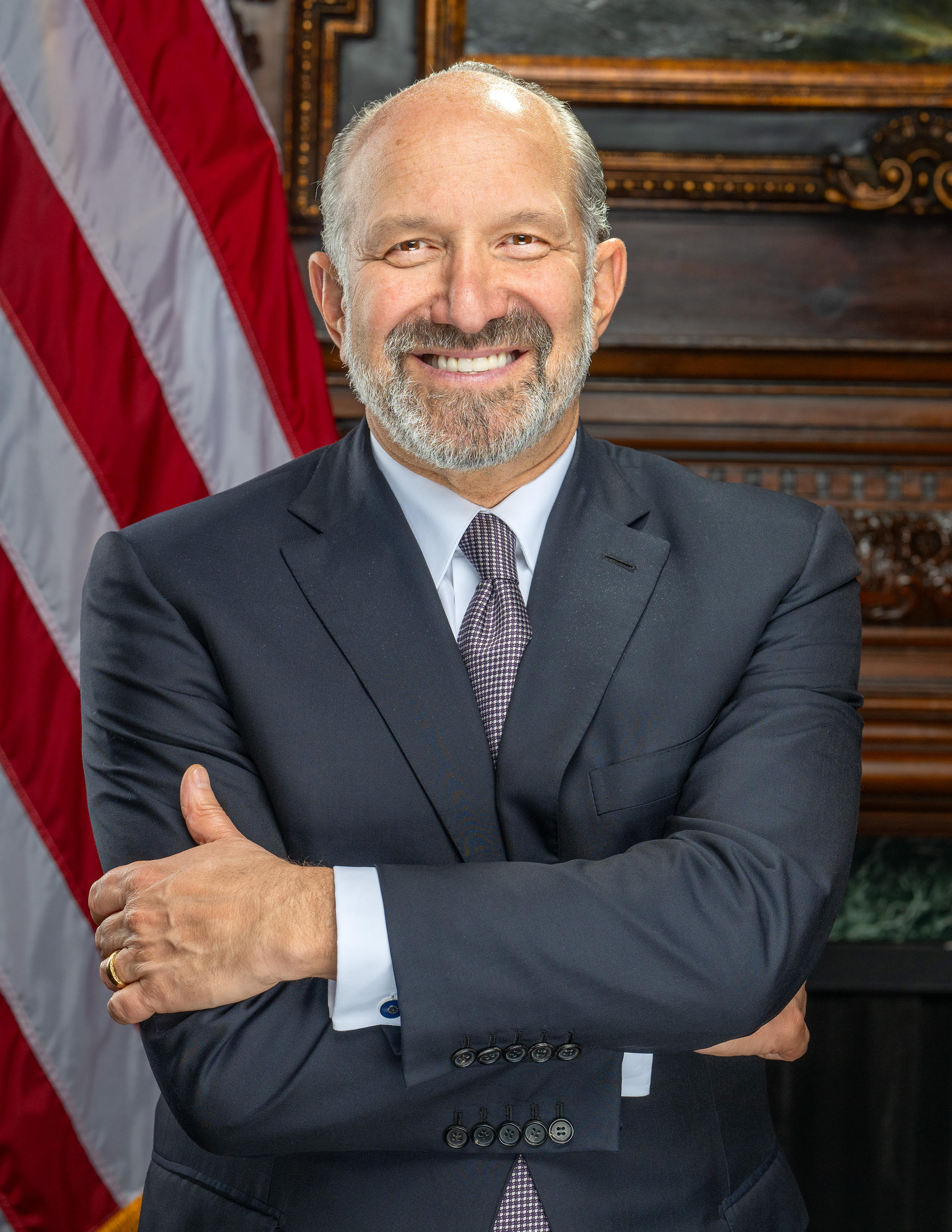
- Official portrait, 2025

41st United States Secretary of Commerce
- Incumbent
- Assumed office February 21, 2025
- President: Donald Trump
- Deputy: Paul Dabbar
- Preceded by: Gina Raimondo

Personal details
- Born: Howard William Lutnick; July 14, 1961 (age 65) Long Island, New York, U.S.
- Party: Democratic (before 2016); Republican (2016–present)
- Spouse: Allison Lambert (m. 1994)
- Children: 4
- Education: Haverford College (BA)

Howard William Lutnick (born July 14, 1961) is an American businessman and government official who has, since 2025, served as the 41st United States secretary of commerce.

In 1983, Lutnick was hired at Cantor Fitzgerald under the mentorship of the firm's founder, B. Gerald Cantor. In 1990, Lutnick became president and chief executive of Cantor Fitzgerald. After Cantor's declining health in 1995, Lutnick became involved in a contentious legal battle with Cantor's wife, Iris, over succession plans, filing suit in Delaware court claiming Cantor lacked sufficient mental capacity to make decisions. Following a settlement that gave Lutnick management control, he was appointed chairman of Cantor Fitzgerald after Cantor's death in 1996. He invested significantly in technology, establishing an electronic trading platform known as eSpeed. In the September 11 attacks, Cantor Fitzgerald lost 658 employees, including Howard's brother, Gary. Lutnick's handling of the aftermath, including the immediate cessation of salaries to families of deceased employees was criticised by victims' families. Lutnick subsequently rebuilt the company giving 25 percent of its profits over five years to the families of the employees killed in the attacks, as well as ten years of healthcare coverage. The company ultimately provided more than $180 million to the families.

After fundraising for Hillary Clinton in 2016, Lutnick was a fundraiser for Donald Trump's 2020 and 2024 presidential campaigns and a vocal proponent of Trump's tariff proposals. In August 2024, he was named co-chair of Donald Trump's presidential transition team. President-elect Trump nominated Lutnick for Secretary of Commerce in November 2024. Following a Senate Committee on Commerce, Science, and Transportation hearing in January 2025, he was confirmed by the Senate in February. As commerce secretary, he has advocated for tariffs and made controversial statements regarding Social Security payments. Time listed Lutnick as one of the world's 100 most influential people in 2025.

== Early life and education ==
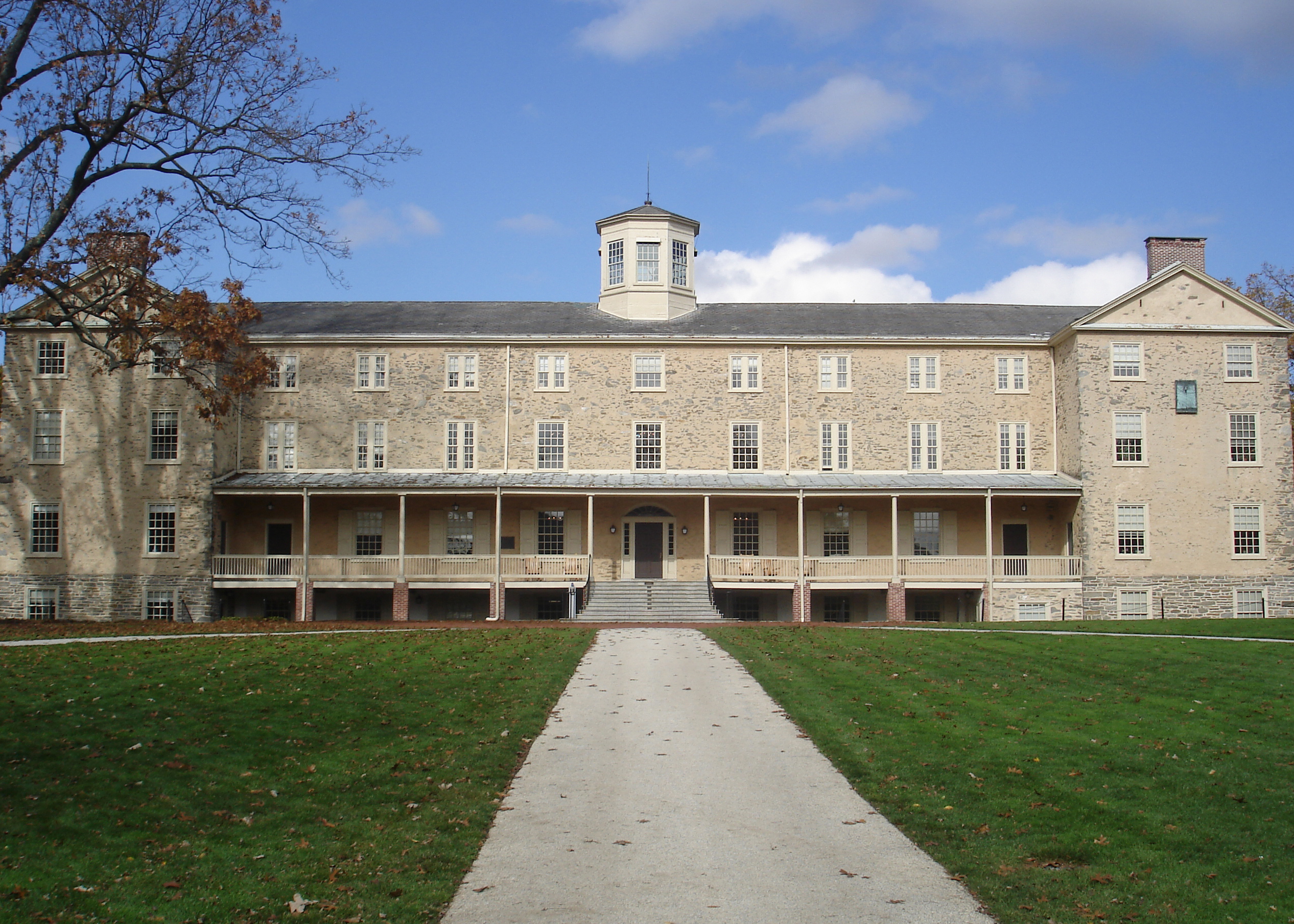
Haverford College, where Lutnick studied, pictured in 2010

Howard William Lutnick was born on July 14, 1961, on Long Island, New York. He was the second son of Solomon and Jane (née Lieberman) Lutnick. (Note: Solomon and Jane had one child before and after Lutnick: Edith "Edie" (born 1959/1960) and Gary (1964/1965–2001).) Solomon was a professor of history at Queens College, City University of New York, while Jane was a painter and sculptor who taught at the C.W. Post Campus of Long Island University. Lutnick is of Jewish descent. He was raised in Jericho, New York, and attended Jericho High School. In February 1978, during Lutnick's junior year, Jane died of lymphoma. Lutnick attended Haverford College as a Division III tennis recruit. In Lutnick's first week of classes, Solomon died of a chemotherapy drug overdose; he was being treated for colon cancer that had metastasized to his lungs. Robert Stevens, the president of Haverford College, offered to waive his fees to the university. At Haverford, Lutnick became captain of the tennis team. He graduated in 1983 with a degree in economics.

== Career ==
=== Cantor Fitzgerald ===
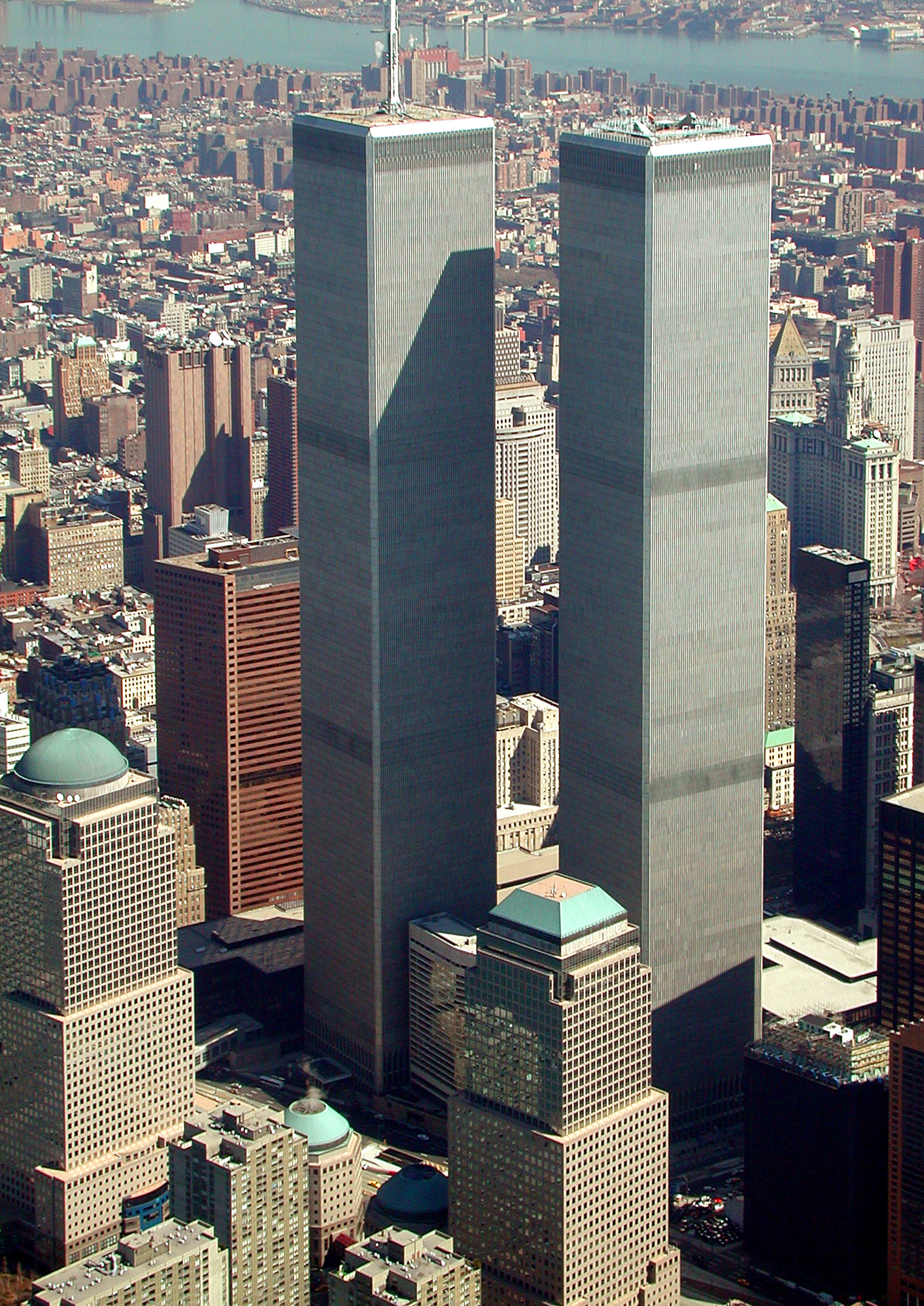
1 World Trade Center (left), Cantor Fitzgerald's corporate headquarters until its destruction

After graduating, Lutnick worked at Noonan, Astley & Pierce as a broker for the United States dollar–Japanese yen exchange, where he met B. Gerald Cantor. In 1983, Cantor took Lutnick as his protégé and hired him at his eponymous firm, Cantor Fitzgerald, encouraged by Rod Fisher, a partner at the firm and Cantor's nephew. Within a year and a half, Lutnick had steadily ascended within the firm, becoming the chief executive of a division of Cantor Fitzgerald that managed the personal investments of Cantor and his associates. He brought additional clients, increasing its profitability to become one of Cantor Fitzgerald's most lucrative divisions. By December 1990, Lutnick was appointed Cantor's successor in the event of his death. In 1991, after a failed attempt by Cantor Fitzgerald's president to oust him, Lutnick became the firm's chief executive and president. The following year, Cantor restructured Cantor Fitzgerald to a partnership and implemented a succession plan, abandoning his previous effort to give the company to a charitable foundation.

In 1990, Cantor began undergoing kidney dialysis, and in December 1995, he was hospitalized in New York. Lutnick moved to implement a succession plan at Cantor Fitzgerald, allowing him to become a managing general partner at the firm. The lack of involvement of Cantor's family infuriated its members, including his wife, Iris Cantor, whose attorneys had argued with Lutnick's attorneys. In March 1996, Lutnick and his division, CF Group Management, filed a lawsuit in Delaware to enforce the plan, arguing that Cantor did not possess "sufficient mental capacity" to understand the legal documents he was signing. The New York Times noted that Lutnick had already lost the necessary support of the Cantors. The partners settled in May, allowing Lutnick to retain management control while the Cantors hold a limited partnership stake. In July, Cantor died. As chairman of Cantor Fitzgerald, Lutnick sought to broker deals with larger investment companies such as Deutsche Bank and Merrill Lynch.

Lutnick heralded technology at Cantor Fitzgerald. In September 1998, the firm began electronic trading for futures contracts on Treasury bonds and notes, developing eSpeed, an electronic trading platform, with an investment of US$250 million. eSpeed was released in March 1999. In addition, Lutnick diversified Cantor's investments, seeking to establish a brokering business in Europe—spending at least US$43 million since 1994—and a futures exchange known as Cantor Exchange, though it traded significantly fewer contracts than its competitors, including the Chicago Board of Trade. Businessman Michael Spencer noted that eSpeed had become a dominant market in Treasury securities trading, but had not achieved similar successes in other markets. By September 2001, eSpeed had created four dozen marketplaces, including TradeSpark, an exchange for natural gas and electricity. After the Enron scandal, TradeSpark received a surge in usage.

At the time of the terrorist attacks on September 11, 2001, Cantor Fitzgerald was headquartered in the North Tower of the World Trade Center. The company occupied several floors just above where American Airlines Flight 11 crashed into the building. Of the 960 total employees who worked for Cantor Fitzgerald in New York City, all 658 who were in the office on the day of the attacks died. Lutnick was scheduled to go into the office that day, but he had taken his son to kindergarten. His brother, Gary, did not survive. Cantor Fitzgerald's operations in London and New Jersey allowed eSpeed to continue trading. Lutnick's interviews with Connie Chung on ABC News were widely publicized and he became nationally recognized. Internally, however, he garnered criticism from families of deceased employees at Cantor Fitzgerald for the company's refusal to continue paying their salaries through the end of the year. According to Lutnick, getting this authorized was beyond practical: banks would not endorse the continued payment of two-thirds of their employees, particularly when they were well-aware that said employees were deceased and no longer active employees of the company. Lutnick stated the relief Cantor obtained by way of immediate cessation of the then-missing employees' salaries and benefits, including "health insurance for families" provided Cantor Fitzgerald with an indispensable safety net in the immediate, uncertain aftermath. The American Red Cross offered as much as US$30,000 to the families of the victims after Lutnick appealed to the organization's president and chief executive, Bernadine Healy. Lutnick attended twenty funerals a day for over a month. In October, Cantor Fitzgerald began distributing US$45 million to families. In February 2002, the firm announced it would divide US$4.9 million in profit to survivors.

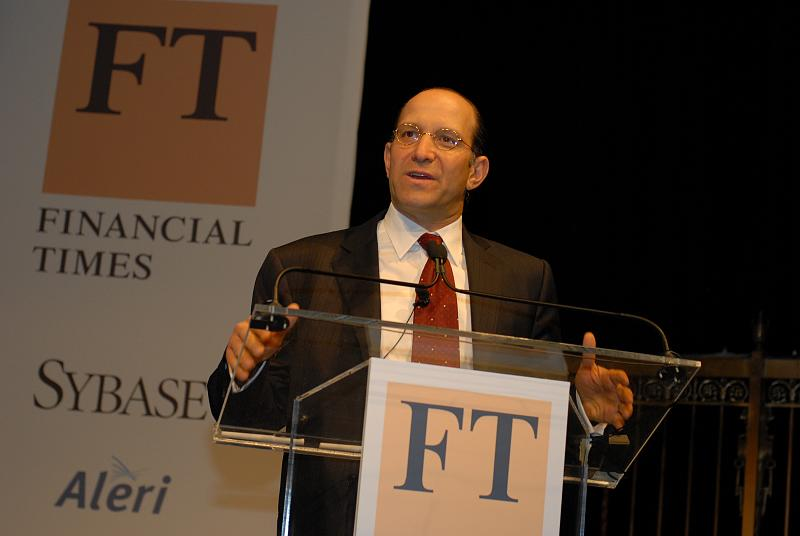
Lutnick speaking at a Financial Times event in November 2007

A year after the attacks, Lutnick began negotiations to relocate Cantor Fitzgerald to Union Square, Manhattan, at 14th Street between Broadway and University Place, from the firm's temporary headquarters at 135 East 57th Street. He requested US$50 million for the initiative from the United States Congress and formed a working relationship with Florida representative Bill Young, the chairman of the House Committee on Appropriations, but the final legislation signed by president George W. Bush did not explicitly mention Cantor Fitzgerald and was less than what Lutnick had requested at US$33 million. The deal later fell through, and Lutnick began considering 10 Hanover Square before moving into 110 East 59th Street, fulfilling his vow to never return to Lower Manhattan. By December 2002, Cantor Fitzgerald had 750 employees in New York. In August 2004, the firm established a partnership, BGC Partners, for its voice brokerage business. Lutnick was appointed the chief executive of Cantor Fitzgerald's fixed-income trading and sales business, succeeding Irvin Goldman, in October 2007.

In January 2017, Anshu Jain, a former Deutsche Bank executive, joined Cantor Fitzgerald as its president; Jain died in 2022. By September 2018, Lutnick was worth US$1.5 billion, according to the Bloomberg Billionaires Index. Since 2020, Cantor Fitzgerald has invested in cryptocurrency, particularly Tether, a major cryptocurrency company that was the subject of an investigation and enforcement action by the New York Attorney General over allegations concerning its reserves and the handling of funds. In July 2024, Lutnick and presidential candidate Donald Trump spoke at a Bitcoin conference in Nashville, Tennessee, in which Lutnick announced Cantor Fitzgerald would open a US$2 billion lending facility with Bitcoin as collateral. As of October 2024, Cantor Fitzgerald manages the majority of Tether's reserve assets, including over US$80 billion in Treasury securities. The firm has also invested in political endeavors, including by encouraging Rumble, an alt-tech video hosting company, to go public, advising a business operated by Omeed Malik, and investing in Strive Enterprises, an asset management company owned by Vivek Ramaswamy.

In February 2025, after being confirmed by the Senate as the United States secretary of commerce, Lutnick named his sons, Brandon and Kyle, who were in their 20s, as chairman and executive vice chairman, respectively. In addition, Sage Kelly, Pascal Bandelier, and Christian Wall were named to lead Cantor's investment banking, equities, and fixed income divisions, respectively.

=== Philanthropy (2001–present) ===
After the September 11 attacks, Lutnick donated US$1 million to the Cantor Fitzgerald Foundation. He established the Cantor Fitzgerald Relief Fund, which began donating US$5,000 to families of victims with one or more children in October 2001. Cantor Fitzgerald donated US$4 million to the fund in September 2002. Cantor Fitzgerald and BGC Partners has held an annual charity day on September 11; by September 2014, the event raised US$101 million for non-profits dedicated to the attacks, including the September 11th Education Trust. As of September 2006, the fund has donated US$180 million to families. In 2008, Lutnick appeared on The Celebrity Apprentice, hosted by Donald Trump in a charity auction. The Cantor Fitzgerald Relief Fund has also donated to hurricane relief, including Hurricane Harvey in 2017. With senator Chuck Schumer, Lutnick appeared at P.S. 256 to personally donate US$1,000 debit cards to families affected by Hurricane Sandy. He gave debit cards of an equal amount to victims of the 2013 Moore tornado.

Lutnick is the largest benefactor to Haverford College. As of October 2014, when he gave the largest single donation to the college—valued at US$25 million, he has donated US$65 million in total. Lutnick's donations have gone towards the library named after him; the Douglas B. Gardner Integrated Athletic Center; the Cantor Fitzgerald Gallery; and the Gary Lutnick Tennis & Track Center, among other facilities.

In May 2026, Lutnick had donated US$5 million to the Congressional Leadership Fund, a super PAC aligned with House Republicans.

=== Political activities (2016–present) ===
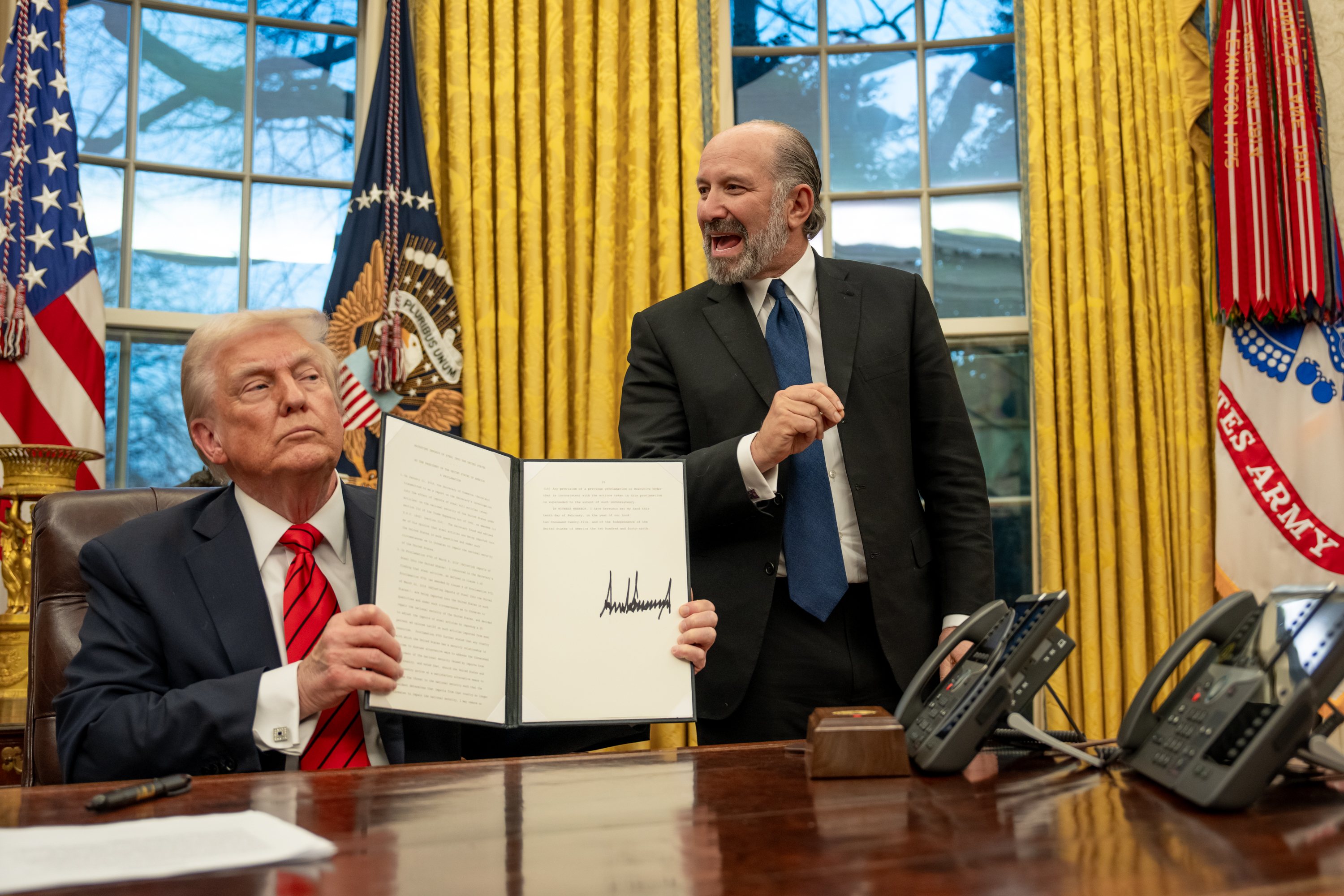
Lutnick with president Donald Trump in February 2025

Lutnick, a lifelong Democrat, registered as a Republican in 2016. In an interview with the Wall Street Journal, he described himself as a fiscal conservative and social liberal who left the Democratic Party after he felt that the party had shifted further to the political left. In the 2016 United States elections, he donated to presidential candidate Hillary Clinton and Senate candidate Kamala Harris. He later attributed those donations to his wife. A Bloomberg News and OpenSecrets analysis found that the Lutnicks have given political donations since 1989. In May 2019, The New York Times disclosed that Lutnick had hosted a fundraiser for U.S. president and presidential candidate Donald Trump that raised more than US$5 million. Five years later, he hosted a fundraiser for South Carolina senator Tim Scott.

Lutnick co-hosted a fundraiser for Donald Trump in London in June 2024 that was organized by Duke Buchan. In August, he raised US$15 million for Trump at his home in Bridgehampton, New York. The event caused traffic delays from Riverhead to Amagansett through the night. That month, Lutnick was appointed co-chair of Trump's transition team overseeing personnel. With Woody Johnson and Kimberly Guilfoyle, he committed to donate US$2.5 million and joined the Trump Victory Trust. By September, he had raised US$11 million for Trump, according to Bloomberg News, including a US$5 million donation to MAGA Inc. He appeared at a rally for Trump at Madison Square Garden with Elon Musk in October.

As co-chairman of Trump's transition team, Lutnick prioritized loyalty to Trump in his hiring decisions. After meeting with Robert F. Kennedy Jr. in October, Lutnick claimed that he was convinced that vaccines cause autism, and that the National Childhood Vaccine Injury Act had allowed vaccine manufacturers to be reckless in the production process. He told the New York Post that month that The Heritage Foundation, which led Project 2025, was "radioactive".

In 2025, Lutnick was one of the donors who funded the White House's East Wing demolition, and planned building of a ballroom.

=== Board memberships and assets ===
In January 2006, Lutnick was named to the board of the World Trade Center Memorial Foundation. As of November 2024, he is a member of the Partnership for New York City's board and Weill Cornell Medicine. From July 2003 to June 2024, he served as a board member of the Horace Mann School. Lutnick's financial disclosure form, released in January 2025, revealed that he had at least US$806 million in assets. He declared shares in GE Aerospace, GE Healthcare, The Walt Disney Company, Nasdaq, Inc., and the musical Kimberly Akimbo. In 2019 and 2023, he borrowed more than US$100 million from Bank of America.

== Secretary of commerce (2025–present) ==
=== Nomination and confirmation ===
Lutnick being sworn in as secretary of commerce on February 21, 2025

Following the 2024 presidential election, Lutnick was being considered as secretary of the treasury. Within a week, discussions had narrowed to Lutnick and Scott Bessent, who was viewed as the front-runner until Lutnick began to advocate for himself. According to Politico, the decision was being delayed by Lutnick's role in providing information to Donald Trump. The New York Times reported that Trump had expressed reservations about Lutnick, portraying him as a constant presence and a manipulator, leading to further delays as he broadened his list of candidates. Lutnick was endorsed to the position by Elon Musk, a Trump advisor; Musk considered Bessent as a "business-as-usual choice." On November 19, 2024, Trump selected Lutnick as his nominee for secretary of commerce.

In the months after the election, Lutnick privately negotiated with companies and countries on Trump's economic policy. According to the New York Times, Lutnick privately encouraged Trump to seek a trade agreement with China, believing that he was in an advantageous position. Lutnick appeared before the Senate Committee on Commerce, Science, and Transportation on January 29, 2025, where he promoted tariffs and vowed greater action on China and its advances in artificial intelligence, particularly the release of DeepSeek R1. In February 2025, the New York Times reported that he had been involved in discussions to offer Intel's manufacturing facilities to TSMC.

On February 18, 2025, Lutnick was confirmed by the Senate in a 51–45 vote. Democratic senators Cory Booker and Gary Peters, as well as Republican senators Jerry Moran and Dan Sullivan, did not vote. He was sworn in on February 21.

=== Tenure ===
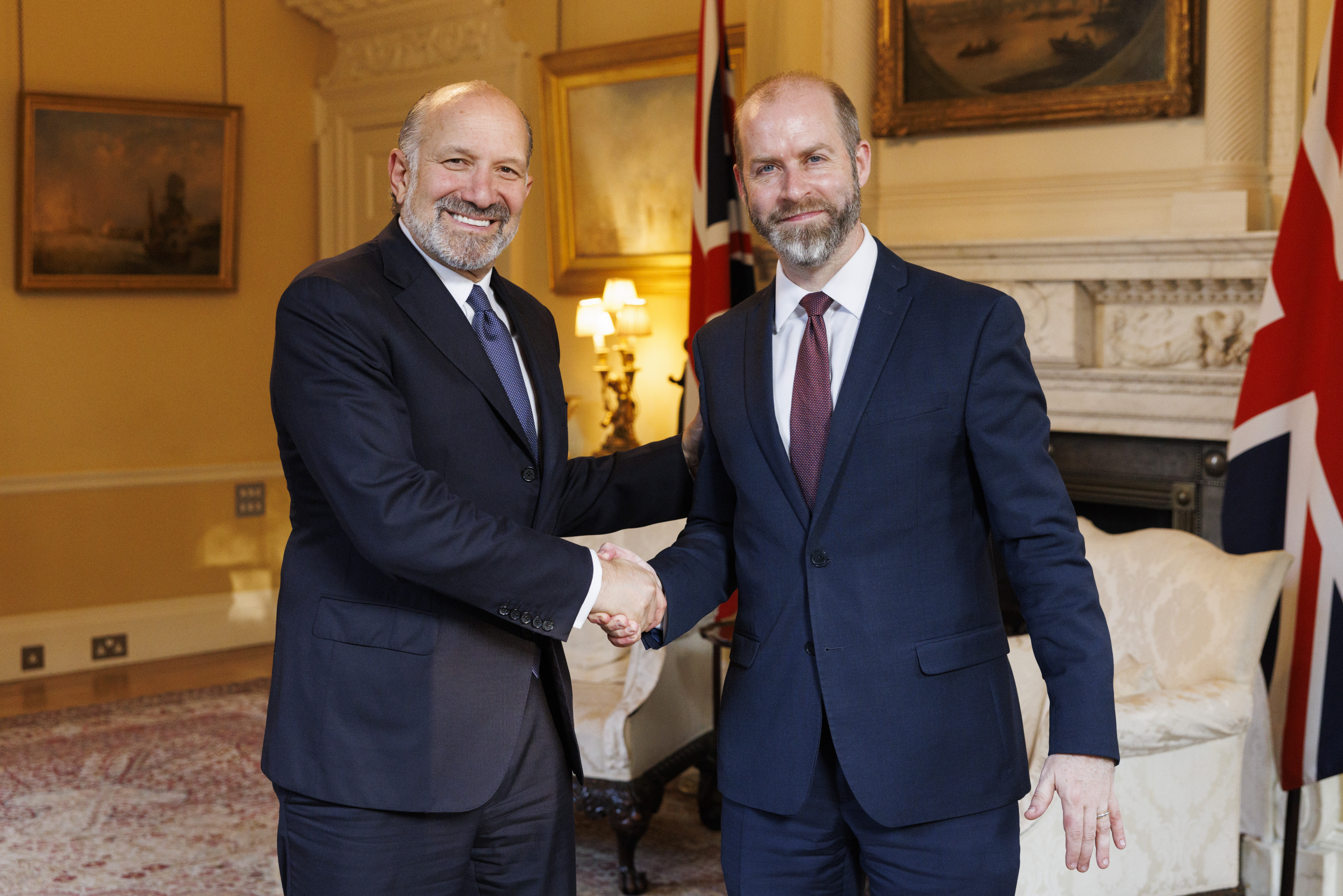
Lutnick meeting with British Secretary of State for Business and Trade Jonathan Reynolds at 10 Downing Street; June 10, 2025

Lutnick has supported Trump's trade policy, including the second Trump tariffs. Prior to his confirmation, Lutnick was directed by Trump to impose reciprocal tariffs, telling reporters that the Department of Commerce's work would be completed by April 1. In his first meeting with an international official, Lutnick—joined by United States trade representative nominee Jamieson Greer and National Economic Council chairman Kevin Hassett—discussed trade with Maroš Šefčovič, the European commissioner for trade and economic security. Following his confirmation, Lutnick received a congratulatory letter from Wang Wentao, the Chinese minister of commerce, expressing dissatisfaction with U.S. tariffs on Chinese goods and that China was willing to resolve "respective concerns through equal dialogue and consultation."

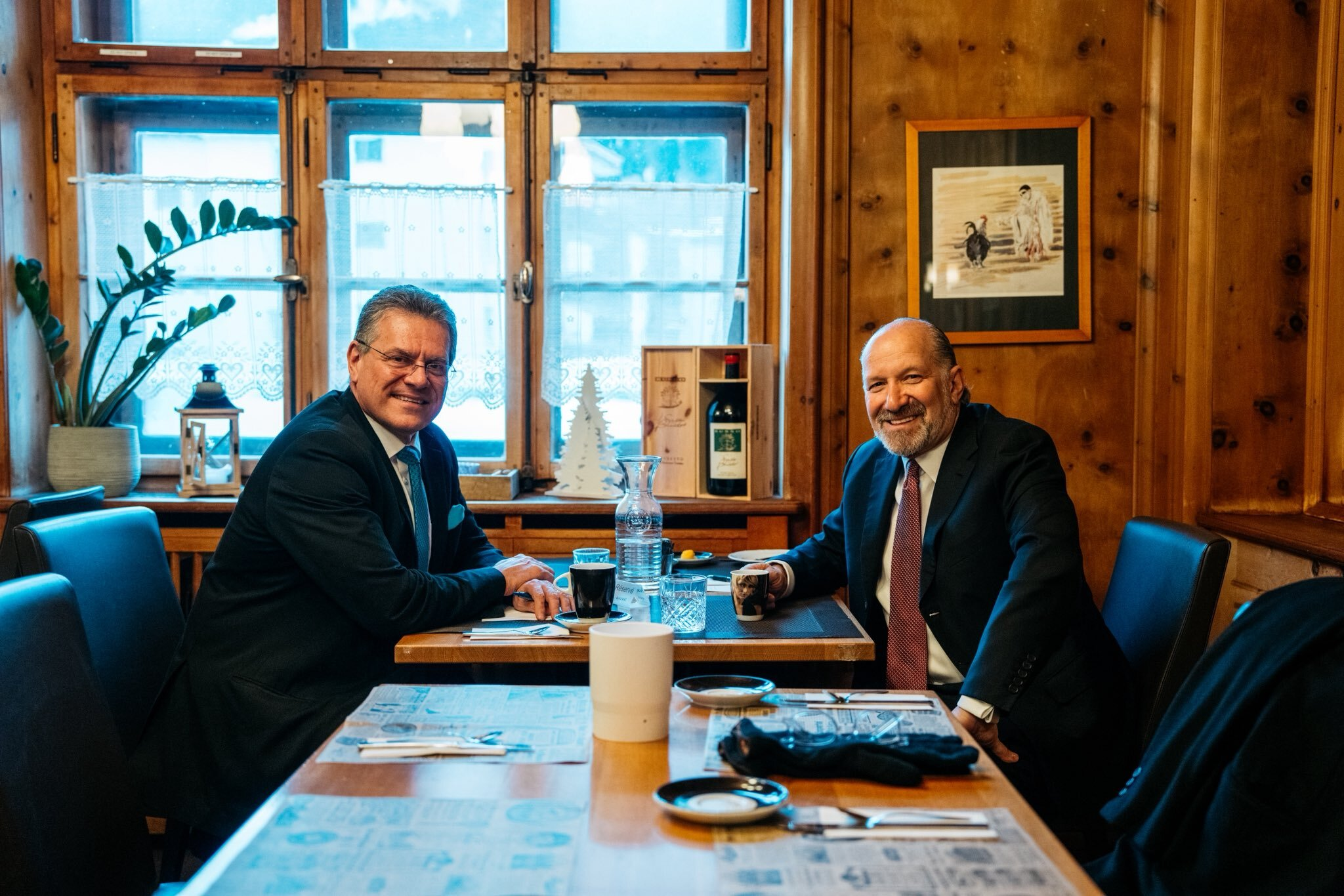
Lutnick meeting European Commissioner for Trade Maroš Šefčovič at the 56th World Economic Forum in Davos (2026)

After Trump initiated a trade war with Canada and Mexico, Lutnick was involved in negotiations with foreign leaders. In an interview on Meet the Press in March 2025, Lutnick said there was "no chance" of a recession due to Trump's economic policies. According to Politico, he received internal criticism for the tariffs. Later that month, Lutnick said the tariffs would be "worth it" even if they lead to a recession. In an interview with the Toronto Star, Lutnick justified imposing tariffs on Canada, citing offshoring and fentanyl. That month, Lutnick encouraged Fox News viewers to purchase stock in Tesla, stating that Tesla stock "will never be this cheap again," which allegedly violated federal ethics rules due to his federal government position. In a podcast interview that month, he stated that only a "fraudster" would be concerned and complain about a missed Social Security check, so "the easiest way to find the fraudster is to stop payments and listen" for complaints.

By April, Lutnick had instituted a policy at the National Oceanic and Atmospheric Administration that all contracts over $100,000 had to be personally approved by him. The policy caused a bottleneck and, by that month, contracts for maintenance and janitorial service at facilities, emergency alert translations, and web hosting had lapsed. Later that month, Lutnick publicly promoted "great jobs of the future" for the United States, "where you work in these [factory] plants for the rest of your life, and your kids work here, and your grandkids work here," as he gave the example of factory robot technician jobs.

In August 2025, President Donald Trump directed Lutnick to elevate the Office of Space Commerce from the National Oceanic and Atmospheric Administration to the Office of the Secretary of Commerce. The executive order also directed the Commerce Department to develop a streamlined process for authorizing commercial space activities that were not clearly covered by existing regulatory frameworks.

In June 2026, Lutnick appeared at U.S. Steel’s Edgar Thomson Plant in Braddock, Pennsylvania, where he discussed the Nippon Steel and U.S. Steel agreement and said domestic steel production was important to national security. He said Nippon was meeting its commitments under the agreement, which included planned investment in American steel production. At the same event, Lutnick described the federal government’s “golden share” in U.S. Steel as giving the government veto power over certain major company decisions without creating a financial stake. Later that month, he sent a letter to Anthropic chief executive Dario Amodei placing the company’s Fable 5 and Mythos 5 artificial intelligence models under export restrictions, citing national security concerns. Anthropic subsequently suspended access to the models while it sought to comply with the restrictions. The Associated Press also reported that Lutnick pushed back on the planned opening of the Gordie Howe International Bridge, which was delayed after the United States and Canada said they were working to resolve outstanding issues.

By June 2026, United States Trade Representative Jamieson Greer had assumed a larger role in the administration’s trade negotiations. Greer led negotiations involving India, Mexico, the United States–Mexico–Canada Agreement and critical minerals, while Lutnick continued to oversee tariff and investment matters administered by the Commerce Department.

In July 2026, Democratic lawmakers expanded an investigation into a Commerce Department agreement with USA Rare Earth by requesting information from Cantor Fitzgerald and USA Rare Earth. Cantor Fitzgerald, then chaired by Lutnick’s son Brandon, had served as the lead placement agent for a private share offering connected to the transaction. The lawmakers requested information about how the firm was selected, the compensation it received and any communications involving Lutnick or Commerce Department officials. Cantor Fitzgerald and the Commerce Department denied that the firm had participated in negotiations over the government investment. The lawmakers requested responses and transaction documents by July 23, 2026.

In November 2026, following revelations of Nvidia CEO Jensen Huang's extramarital affair with Chinese business executive Alice Huang, reporting focused on Lutnick's ties with Nvidia. The New York Times reported that within the Commerce Department, matters related to Nvidia were treated specially, with Lutnick having frequent calls with Jensen Huang. It added that all matters related to Nvidia went through Under Secretary of Commerce for Industry and Security Jeffrey I. Kessler, who rarely took action without approval from Lutnick. It reported that Lutnick had slowed down many measures to restrict exports of advanced Nvidia chips to China. Trump was usually the most sympathetic official to Lutnick, and wanted good relations with Chinese leader Xi Jinping. The Times reported that Treasury Secretary Bessent had confronted Lutnick regarding Alice Huang's company Megaspeed on November 5, 2026 with Lutnick replying the department now could move quickly to put restrictions. Axios reported that President Trump approved action on the alleged transfer of Nvidia chips to China on at least three different occasions in May, August and November 5, 2026. However, it reported Lutnick and Kessler refused to take action due to concerns that the control measures would trigger a China–United States trade war.

== Personal life ==
=== Marriage ===
In December 1994, Lutnick married Allison Lambert, a senior associate at Wilson Elser Moskowitz Edelman & Dicker. Allison was appointed a trustee of the John F. Kennedy Center for the Performing Arts in February 2025 after President Donald Trump appointed himself as the center's chairman. The Lutnicks have four children.

=== Relationship with Jeffrey Epstein ===
Lutnick testifies before the Senate Appropriations Committee on his relationship with Epstein on February 10, 2026.

Lutnick said in October 2025 interview that he was neighbors with Jeffrey Epstein but said in 2005 that he would never be in the same room ever again with him due to his "disgusting" behavior at a meeting with Epstein, Lutnick, and Lutnick's wife. As Lutnick explained at that meeting he had asked why Epstein had a massage table in the middle of his house: "I say to him, 'Massage table in the middle of your house? How often do you have a massage?...And he says, 'Every day.' And then he gets, like weirdly close to me, and he says, 'And the right kind of massage'...[I]n the six to eight steps it takes to get from his house to my house, my wife and I decided that I will never be in the room with that disgusting person ever again." Despite this, Lutnick went on to have various contact with Epstein for many years afterward.

In January 2026, newly released Epstein files showed some contacts between Lutnick and Epstein over several years. A longtime Epstein aide reached out to Lutnick in November 2012 to arrange a meeting while Lutnick was in Saint Thomas; Lutnick, accompanied by his wife Allison and their four children, agreed to a lunch on December 23 on Epstein's private island. Emails showed Lutnick and his wife coordinating logistics, including where to dock their yacht at Little Saint James. The day after the scheduled meeting, BBC News reported that Lutnick "received an email from a redacted sender that said Epstein wanted to pass a message to him, which said: 'Nice seeing you'—suggesting that at least one visit did happen." The two also had drinks together on another occasion in 2011 according to Epstein's schedule. In November 2015, Epstein received an invitation from Lutnick to a fundraiser at his financial firm for Hillary Clinton's presidential campaign. In 2017, the two men discussed plans about the construction of a building across the street from both of their homes. The next year, Epstein contributed to a philanthropic dinner hosted by Lutnick.

When asked about the emails, Lutnick told The New York Times "I spent zero time with him" and hung up. A Commerce Department spokesman said Lutnick had "limited interactions" with Epstein "in the presence of his wife" and has never been accused of wrongdoing. On February 10, 2026, Lutnick testified before the Senate Appropriations Committee on his relationship with Epstein. Here, Lutnick admitted that in December 2012, four years after Epstein's conviction, Lutnick and his wife and children visited Little Saint James where they had lunch with Epstein. The hearing led to bipartisan criticism, and calls for Lutnick's resignation.

On May 13, 2026, ABC News reported that a House Oversight Committee transcript showed that Lutnick had described his contacts with Jeffrey Epstein as limited and that authorities never questioned him in connection with an investigation into Epstein or Maxwell.

During a May 2026, interview with the House Oversight Committee, Lutnick described his contacts with Jeffrey Epstein. The interview followed the release of records indicating that Lutnick had interacted with Epstein after 2005, despite previously stating that he had decided not to be in the same room with him again. Lutnick said that his earlier statement referred to avoiding a personal or professional relationship with Epstein rather than having no subsequent contact with him.

Lutnick acknowledged visiting Epstein’s Manhattan townhouse in 2011 to discuss scaffolding between neighboring properties and attending a lunch on Epstein’s private island with his family in December 2012. He said that the visit was brief and that he did not witness any improper conduct. He also confirmed that he and Epstein were involved in the same 2013 investment in AdFin Solutions, but stated that he had not known of Epstein’s participation at the time.

During the interview, Lutnick withdrew an earlier claim that Epstein had used blackmail and secret recordings, describing the statement as speculation and saying that he had no personal knowledge supporting it. Following the release of the transcript, Democratic members of the committee accused Lutnick of giving inconsistent or evasive answers and called for his resignation or dismissal. Republican committee chairman James Comer defended Lutnick’s cooperation, while the White House continued to support him.

=== Properties ===
In 1998, Lutnick purchased a Manhattan property at 11 East 71st Street, behind the Henry Clay Frick House, from the Comet Trust. Lutnick had extensively renovated its interior by May 2001. Lutnick still owns his mansion, as of 2025. This property is next door to the Herbert N. Straus House, the Manhattan home of Jeffrey Epstein from 1995 until his death.

Lutnick also lives in Bridgehampton, New York, on a 40-acre property he purchased in 2003 for US$15 million. In December 2024, he purchased Bret Baier's home in Washington, D.C., for US$25 million, setting the record for the most expensive house in the city. The property is inspired by the Château du Grand-Lucé. According to the New York Times, the purchase—among others by wealthy members of the Trump administration—contributed to an increase in Washington, D.C.'s luxury real estate market. Additionally, Lutnick owns the penthouse of The Pierre and a condo on the ocean north of Miami Beach.

=== Health ===
In October 2021, Lutnick disclosed that he had been diagnosed with non-Hodgkin's lymphoma. He began chemotherapy shortly thereafter. By September 2024, he was cancer-free.

=== Awards ===
Lutnick is a recipient of the Navy Distinguished Public Service Award. In 2025, he was named one of the world's 100 most influential people by Time.

=== In popular culture ===
Lutnick is prominently featured in the 2013 documentary Out of the Clear Blue Sky, directed by Danielle Gardner, which examines the destruction and rebuilding of Cantor Fitzgerald following the September 11 attacks. The film highlights Lutnick's efforts to preserve the company after the attack, including by controversially stopping salaries to the families of victims.

== Notes ==
Political offices
Preceded by Gina Raimondo	United States Secretary of Commerce; 2025–present	Incumbent
Order of precedence
Preceded by Brooke Rollins as United States Secretary of Agriculture	Order of precedence of the United States as Secretary of Commerce	Succeeded by Keith Sonderling as United States Secretary of Labor
U.S. presidential line of succession
Preceded by Brooke Rollins as United States Secretary of Agriculture	Tenth in line as Secretary of Commerce	Succeeded by Keith Sonderling as United States Secretary of Labor
