= Solomon Lutnick =

American historian (1928–1979)

Solomon M. Lutnick (September 6, 1928 in New York City – September 13, 1979 in Syosset, Long Island) was an American historian.

== Family ==
Salomon Lutnick was born in the Bronx, the son of a laundry owner. In 1950, he married Jane Lieberman from New Jersey, with whom he had a daughter and two sons. Both of his parents were Jewish. His son Howard Lutnick became Secretary of Commerce of the United States in 2025. Lutnick's wife Jane, who was a sculptor and painter, died in 1978 at the age of forty-two.

== Career ==
After graduating from high school, Lutnick studied history at Columbia University. He earned after his bachelor's degree his master's degrees there in 1960, followed by a Ph.D. in 1962.

After teaching briefly at Hunter College of the City University of New York, he moved to Queens College of the university in 1956, where he taught for the rest of his career. Since studying under Richard B. Morris, his research focused on the American Revolution. His 1967 work The American Revolution and the British Press has been cited numerous times in academia. He also conducted research on the British historian and politician Edward Gibbon. However, a planned biography was never completed due to Lutnick's death.

Lutnick was most recently an associate professor of history at Queens College. He died on September 13, 1979, after a long illness.

He is commemorated by the Solomon Lutnick Prize, which is awarded annually to the graduate of the Queens College History Department with the best academic record in the subject of American history.

== Publications (selection) ==
- The American Victory at Saratoga: A View from the British Press. In: New York History, Vol. 44, No. 2 (April 1963), p. 103–127. JSTOR 23157278.
- The Defeat at Yorktown: A View from the British Press. In: The Virginia Magazine of History and Biography, Vol. 72, No. 4 (October 1964), p. 471–478. JSTOR 4247059.
- The American Revolution and the British Press, 1775–1783, University of Missouri Press, Columbia, Mo., 1967.
- Edward Gibbon and the Decline of the First British Empire: The Historian as Politician. In: Studies in Burke and His Time, Vol. 10, No. 2 (1968), 1097–1112
