= Alice Huang (executive) =

Chinese technology executive (born 1977)

- Born: Huang Le; 1977 (age 48–49); Hunan Province, China
- Citizenship: China (Note: with right of abode in Hong Kong)
- Education: Hong Kong Baptist University (MSocSc)
- Occupations: Technology executive, investor
- Employer: Megaspeed International
- Spouse: Kang Wei

Chinese name
- Simplified Chinese: 黄乐
- Traditional Chinese: 黄樂
- Hanyu Pinyin: Huáng Lè

Alice Huang (Chinese: 黄乐; pinyin: Huáng Lè; born 1977) is a Chinese technology executive and investor. She was an executive at Megaspeed, a Singaporean technology company, before she reportedly stepped down from her role in August 2025. Huang's role in the company after that is contested.

Born in Hunan, Huang reportedly worked as a television journalist for Chinese state media channels China Central Television and Hunan TV, although Hunan TV later said it had no record of her employment. In the mid-2000s she studied in Hong Kong and received a Master of Social Science in media management from Hong Kong Baptist University. She worked in HSBC Hong Kong and CITIC Securities, before joining Hexi Capital in 2015. There, she became intimately associated with the technology figure Kang Wei, formerly the youngest hedge fund chief executive in China. The two were eventually married.

In the 2020s, Huang and Kang moved towards cloud computing. In March 2023, Huang became the controlling shareholder of the Singapore-based Megaspeed. Alibaba Group quickly became the biggest client of Megaspeed. The company also established partnership with Nvidia, allowing Chinese tech companies including Alibaba Group to access data centres in Southeast Asia with Nvidia chips. According to a company statement released in 2026, Huang reportedly left Megaspeed in August 2025.

In November 2026, the Financial Times and The New York Times reported that she had a romantic relationship with Nvidia CEO Jensen Huang (no relation), and that U.S. officials believed she had been recruited as a spy by China's Ministry of State Security. Megaspeed is also alleged to have violated American export controls on China on advanced semiconductors. The Chinese government has denied these espionage allegations. Later reporting revealed that the U.S. Intelligence Community is unsure if Huang is a spy and that intelligence collected on her to date did not prove that she was.

== Early life ==
Huang Le was born in a rural area of Hunan Province. She attended Jiangnan Middle School (Class 9305) in the Yuhu District of Xiangtan in 1993, making her birth year about 1977.

In the mid-2000s, Huang studied in Hong Kong and received a Master of Social Science in media management from Hong Kong Baptist University. According to a former classmate, she was "well-liked, easygoing and ambitious". Huang later obtained Hong Kong residency and a Hong Kong passport.

== Career ==
According to her public resume and private equity database, Huang claimed to have accumulated four years of experience in the media industry and eight years in the financial securities industry. At some point, she also worked in the video game industry. Huang worked as a television journalist for Chinese state media channels China Central Television and Hunan TV. Some Western media outlets have been unable to confirm some of these details.

Hunan TV later said that there was no record of Huang's employment, and there was no relevant information on the official websites of the two TV stations. Bai Jie, a former CCTV reporter with the online name "Yaba", wrote that Huang was indeed her former office colleague.

=== Finance ===
Huang went to work at HSBC Hong Kong as president of the private banking department. At a later point, she joined CITIC Securities as part of its credit trading division, where she was the vice president of the securities and financial business line of the financial market management committee. In 2015, Huang joined the private equity firm Hexi Capital, a company founded by Kang Wei in 2010, as an executive director and partner. This firm was involved with gaming, technology, and data centres.

Huang also served as a director of Shanghai Yunxi Investment Management Consulting, one of the shareholders of Hexi Capital. All of her shares in Hexi Capital were transferred by Kang and held through Shanghai Yunxi Investment. From 2016, Huang and Kang started co-running Hexi Capital. According to WeChat posts from Hexi Capital's official account in 2016 and 2017, Huang was the company's deputy general manager, executive director and a member of its investment decision committee.

During her tenure, Huang gradually established close ties with companies and investors in Shanghai and Zhejiang. The related business network participated in the construction of a large data centre for Tencent in the suburbs of Shanghai, and also invested in a cybersecurity subsidiary of China Electronics Technology Group Corporation. The Journal reported in 2026 that "Over the past decade, Kang and Alice Huang hopscotched from one lucrative opportunity to the next—video game companies, pharmaceutical takeovers and cloud computing—each time weaving a web of related entities, transferring stakes among themselves and capitalizing on whatever connections were at hand".

It is unknown if Alice Huang ever left Hexi Capital. A company representative told the Financial Times that she had left the company in 2017, but an investor told the newspaper that she was still presenting business cards from the company as recently as 2025. A holding company founded by Huang held 48% ownership of Hexi Capital until August 2025.

In August 2019, Huang conducted transactions through several British Virgin Islands offshore companies, including a Hong Kong company where Kang served as a director. She made ¥1 billion renminbi (US$145 million) from the sale of the British Virgin Islands-based holding company Osmanthus Vale Holdings Limited, whose annual revenues had increased from US$36,000 in 2015 to US$36 million in 2018, to 7Road Holdings. Hexi was the "ultimate holding company" of Osmanthus, which was incorporated in the British Virgin Islands less than two months before the purchase by 7Road.

Hangzhou Shengfeng was the biggest operating subsidiary of Osmanthus. The company was purchased from Zhejiang Century Huatong Group, a maker of internet video games which had invested along Hexi Capital, by a Hexi-backed fund in 2017 for ¥500 million renminbi. In 2019, the Hexi-backed fund moved Hangzhou Shengfeng to newly created offshore companies before consolidated them under Osmanthus. It is unclear how Huang came to own 100 percent of Osmanthus. Hexi Capital was a shareholder in Century Huatong between 2014 and 2017, while Century Huatong indirectly owned 10.94% of 7Road in 2026 and was a shareholder since 2010.

=== Technology ===
By 2020, Kang and Huang were joint business partners in many ventures. They were also moving towards cloud computing. That year, they helped build and operate an AI computing centre in Shanghai for Tencent. From 2021 to 2022, Huang served as the director of Shanghai Longjing Information Technology. The company was founded in December 2020 as a data-centre focused subsidiary of Century Huatong, which had also bought a 10 percent stake in 7Road in the same month.

Shanghai Longjing's legal representative Gu Jiong had worked with Huang in Hexi Capital and was the legal representative of Hangzhou Shengfeng Network Technology, a Chinese video game company that Huang sold to 7Road in 2019. The Shanghai Municipal People's Government announced in 2023 that Shanghai Longjing would build a data centre called the Yangtze River Delta Project with 6,000 AI server racks, with the location being a complex which has Tencent as a major tenant.

According to The Wire China, Tencent rents rack space from the company, which it uses to fill with own chips, with the Songjiang district government reporting the complex would eventually provide 10 times as much computing power as the world's largest supercomputer. A Tencent spokesperson subsequently said Tencent has never had a stake in the complex or operated it, while The Wire China said it is unknown if Huang held an operational role at Shanghai Longjing.

In November 2024, Huang was appointed as a director of the ride-hailing platform T3 Mobility (Nanjing Lingxing Technology). The platform was jointly invested by the three major state-owned automobile enterprises, together with Tencent and Alibaba Group, and submitted a listing application to the Hong Kong Stock Exchange in April 2026. In September 2026, it was suspended by the China Securities Regulatory Commission, and the authorities launched an investigation into the issue of shareholding on behalf of others. Huang registered two new companies in Hong Kong in July and August 2026, such as Stag Bay Technology Limited and Aspen Creek Limited, and continued to use secretarial companies and shell companies to carry out capital operations.

==== Megaspeed ====
In 2023, a few months after the United States government imposed export restrictions on artificial intelligence chips to China, Huang was a part of the group of investors who purchased 7Road International, the Singapore subsidiary of the 7Road Holdings; the subsidiary was sold to a British Virgin Islands-registered company associated with Huang called Huang Le Ltd and renamed to Megaspeed. Huang became the controlling shareholder in March of that year. She served as the director of the company from March to November 2023. She also served as the director and managing director of the company's Indonesia subsidiary in the same period.

Kang also worked with Huang in building the business. They presented themselves as AI entrepreneurs, courting investors and business partners in a private club located next to the Radisson Blu Hotel Shanghai New World. They did not disclose their romantic relationship to investors. Huang was described as having "formidable networking skills and a strong record of turning those relationships into business deals".

In Singapore, she began to identify herself as Alice Wong, using the Cantonese spelling of her surname instead of Mandarin Chinese. Her sister Huang Yu was also named as director and investor in companies connected to Huang and Kang. On paper, Huang left the company in November 2023 and sold Huang Le Ltd sold the shares of Megaspeed to a Singapore shell company owned by Tan Yong Pong called Swiftdata International. However, according to an investigation by Culper Research, Huang was still in charge of the company in May 2026. The Journal also reported that she continued to act as the company's leader since then, introducing herself as Megaspeed's CEO to a business partner as recently as August 2025.

On 15 November 2026, Megaspeed said Huang had left the company on 30 August 2025 and had no current rule there. Huang continued to participate in the chip procurement and fundraising work of SwiftData as a senior manager until she left the company in 2025. SwiftData's actual office scale in Singapore was limited, with only one storefront office and only 2 to 10 employees listed on LinkedIn. Agence France-Presse reported that the contact number listed on the company's official website was actually a private residence.

One of Megaspeed's biggest clients became Alibaba Group, the online Chinese retailer. Megaspeed was Alibaba's anchor customer for cloud services in Southeast Asia since the beginning, and was its biggest client. The Wall Street Journal reported Alibaba was looking for a partner that would help it access data centres with chips from the American multinational technology corporation Nvidia. According to the The Information Nvidia's sales team introduced Alice Huang to Alibaba in two occasions across several months in 2022. Following the implementation of U.S. export controls in August 2022, Nvidia sales team suggested to Alibaba that Alice Huang could solve the problem by renting Nvidia chips in Southeast Asia.

Huang was present at one of the first meetings between Nvidia and Megaspeed; Nvidia CEO Jensen Huang was not present. She was described as "unassuming and quiet" in the meeting. Megaspeed told the Nvidia team about its relationship with Alibaba. Megaspeed later told Nvidia that Alibaba would be an anchor customer. Megaspeed became an Nvidia Cloud Partner in November 2023, giving the company priority access to chips. According to The Wall Street Journal, Alice Huang had leveraged her connections with Jensen Huang to get Megaspeed to become an Nvidia Cloud Partner. According to the Journal, Megaspeed also brought servers it acquired from Nvidia to data centres in Malaysia, which provided computing power to Alibaba, and shipped some of the servers to China, including the Century Litong which Kang had done business with.

In June 2024, Alibaba, through its Singaporean subsidiary called Apex Enterprise Solutions, lent money to Megaspeed, via its Malaysian subsidiary Speedmatrix, with Speedmatrix pledging its entire business as collateral for the loan. In 2024, Megaspeed's balance sheet increased from $33 million to $3 billion, mostly due to its subsidiaries’ dealings. By mid-2024 Megaspeed was poised to buy $2 billion of Nvidia AI technology over the following year, and its Malaysian subsidiary, Speedmatrix, received more than 200 shipments of restricted Nvidia technology between June 2024 and June 2025. The Information reported Megaspeed had imported Nvidia chips and either rented them to Chinese companies or physically shipped them to China.

The Journal reported Kang and Huang also planned several data centre projects from late 2024 to June 2025, including two in Southeast Asia and one in Shanghai, with the couple expressing confidence expecting to triple their money in three years and get Nvdia chips to China. In early 2025, Huang and Kang sought investment worth several hundred million dollars for a Southeast Asia data centre project, and told investors they had "no problem securing GPUs" and cited Alibaba as a partner for the project.

In 2024, during the Biden Administration, the United States Department of Commerce was investigating whether Megaspeed was circumventing American export restrictions. In September 2024, an official from the Commerce Department's Bureau of Industry and Security visited Megaspeed's data centre in Malaysia and found some Nvidia equipment still in its boxes, raising concerns that it was being shipped in or out rather than installed. U.S. officials then raised their concerns about Megaspeed with Singaporean and Malaysian authorities and with Nvidia.

In 2024, the Taiwanese government, at the request of the United States, began monitoring Huang's movements. In February 2025, Singapore's police and customs authorities opened an investigation into several companies and their key officers, including Megaspeed, over possible false declarations in the purchase of servers; Huang was investigated because she was then Megaspeed's chief executive, chairperson and one of its key controllers. On 24 June 2025, when the U.S. Bureau of Industry and Security carried out a post-shipment verification check at Megaspeed with her present, the Singapore Police Force interviewed her and impounded her passport to secure her attendance, as she was not based in Singapore.

In a joint statement on 16 November 2026, the U.S. Commerce and Justice departments said that in May 2025 Commerce investigators asked Nvidia for records of any sales to Megaspeed, whether made directly or through intermediaries, and that in June Nvidia put the company on its "no sell" list. That month, according to the statement, agents of the Bureau of Industry and Security, accompanied by Singaporean law enforcement, visited Megaspeed for an end-use check and interviewed Huang, whom the statement described as the company's chief executive. The statement said the Justice Department had since become the lead agency on the criminal inquiry into Megaspeed.

In February 2026, the police, in consultation with the Attorney-General's Chambers, concluded that there was insufficient evidence that she had committed any offence relating to the declarations, but assessed that she had knowingly given them inaccurate information to downplay her role in Megaspeed; she was given a stern warning and barred from re-entering Singapore. Her passport was returned on 26 February 2026, and she left Singapore that day. Singapore's investigations into Megaspeed and six other people are continuing. She has not been seen in public since October 2025. According to a person familiar with the company, she subsequently flew to Shanghai, and a new boss began giving orders to Megaspeed's employees.

CNN reported that for at least several months by the spring 2026, Huang was an intelligence target for the United States Department of Defense's National Security Agency. The Wall Street Journal reported Alice Huang was in China in September 2026. Financial Times also reported that people who knew her believed that she was back in China. Bloomberg News later reported that Huang had returned to China and was currently living in Beijing.

==== Century Litong ====
In June 2023, Shanghai Century Litong was established in China with Shanghai Century Longteng as its founding sole shareowner, which itself was indirectly owned by Shanghai Yunxi Investment. Alice Huang held 99% ownership of Shanghai Yunxi Investment until 2017, after which her sister Huang Yu took over that stake. The company gained Nvidia Cloud Partner status in October 2023. In 2023, the Shanghai-listed Jiangsu Lettall Electronics bought 90% of Century Litong, announcing all of the company's business would be located in data centers in Shenzhen and Shanghai; it eventually owned all of the company by 2024.

In June 2024, Century Longteng exited the company. Located in Shanghai, Century Litong operates data centers that include Nvidia GPUs and rents out computing capacity. Its customers have included a unit of the state-owned China Electronics Technology Group, and its partners include Hangjin Technology, a listed company whose subsidiaries make chips for China's military.

On 20 November 2026, The New York Times reported on a confidential analysis by the intelligence firm Strider Technologies, saying it had reviewed the findings and independently confirmed many of the corporate ties they identified. According to the analysis, about US$3.6 billion in Chinese government money had flowed through companies associated with Huang's family or associates, funding technology projects that included data centres that received Nvidia chips.

The Times said the findings linked Huang's family, and companies that had acquired Nvidia chips, to Chinese state-owned defence contractors that supply the People's Liberation Army, mostly through indirect relationships, and that it remained unclear whether Nvidia chips had been used to support Chinese military projects. It reported that when Century Longteng founded Century Litong, it was 27% owned by an investment firm controlled by Huang's sister, and, citing Strider, that Kang had been Century Longteng's executive director since February 2022.

According to Strider, Century Litong delivered servers containing Nvidia H800 chips to a supercomputing centre in Shanghai in October 2023; the Times said the chips may have been obtained legally, as U.S. restrictions on H800 sales to China took effect that month. Century Litong now runs servers at that centre under a lease of about US$54 million from a leasing arm of the Aviation Industry Corporation of China. The Shenzhen data center was built for Huawei's cloud unit, with the project being awarded to a company controlled by Century Longteng in 2022.

The Information reports that some of Megaspeed's imports from Nvidia went to Century Litong, and that some of the chips the company had acquired eventually ended up in data centers operated by Alibaba, Tencent and smaller Chinese AI labs. According to The Information, after the U.S. had extended its export ban on China to the A800 and H800, which had happened two weeks before Shanghai Century Litong gained Nvidia Cloud Partner status, Huang had a key role in securing the chip orders when they got stuck in the supply chain. It reported that she helped move around 240,000 banned Nvidia chips to China, of which most were the H100 and H200 systems, while some were A100s.

The imports were worth at least worth at least US$7.5 billion. It cited sources saying Alice Huang's relationship with Nvidia CEO Jensen Huang made the imports possible. It added the company had managed to import Blackwell chips despite U.S. export restrictions. The website also said that Century Litong acted as a key supplier of restricted Nvidia chips to major Chinese tech companies. It added some Nvidia hardware were originally bought by Megaspeed subsidiary Speedmatrix and subsequently reached Century Litong. In an emailed statement to The Information, the company said it had "has no business dealings with Ms. Huang".

The Information reported that during the second funding round of DeepSeek between July and October, company employees introduced Century Litong and its parent company, Jiangsu Lettall Electronics to investors. The two companies, collectively referred to as Litong Inc, participated in the founding round through special purpose vehicles set up by DeepSeek’s investors, which raised ¥105.5 billion renminbi (US$15.8 billion) in October. One of the investments went through Monolith Management, founded by former Sequoia Capital China partner Cao Xi which was the third-largest investor in DeepSeek, with Lettall having invested ¥95 million renminbi (US$14 million) in Monolith.

Lettall also owns 80% of Nanjing Jinning Microwave, which makes components that Lettall has said are used in Chinese radar and missile systems. Strider said that from late 2025 into early 2026, Century Litong appeared to be one of only a few sources able to supply Nvidia chips to China at the scale needed for the country's AI build-out. On 19 November 2026, the House Foreign Affairs Committee released confidential information on Nvidia's applications for licences to sell H200 chips to Chinese firms, showing that Nvidia had sought permission to sell more than 40,000 H200s to Century Litong's Hong Kong subsidiary. Nvidia said that, although it had received some licences, it had already stopped shipping H200s to China, and that it had not shipped and would not ship to that company.

== Personal life ==
Huang is married to Chinese investor Kang Wei.

=== Relationship with Jensen Huang ===
Alice Huang met Jensen Huang (no relation), the CEO of Nvidia, as early as 2023. The Wall Street Journal reported that Jensen Huang was introduced to Alice Huang by Kang Wei. Kang had met Jensen Huang in Asia in the 2010s through Hexi Capital's investment in tech businesses including video games, with Nvidia focusing on chips for video games at the time. The Journal also reported that Kang appeared to accept his wife's close relationship to Jensen Huang and spoke openly of their closeness.

The Information reported that according to people who knew her, Huang "regularly posted photos of her and Jensen on her WeChat feed, and showed colleagues and customers additional photos of them together, and bragged to those people that Jensen Huang celebrated her birthday every year by having dinner with her or sending her gifts". She had also regularly Nvidia’s annual gathering for local partners in China.

The two met during an annual Nvidia event in California in early 2024, where she acted as Megaspeed's representative. Alice Huang and Jensen Huang met later at Computex Taipei in June 2024, where they appeared at a party together along with senior executives from Gigabyte Technology. At the occasion, she reportedly said "‘I bet you guys I can get Jensen here", with Jensen Huang showing up afterwards almost immediately and drinking a whiskey shot with the group before he left the party with two Nvidia executives he arrived with.

When Jensen Huang visited Taiwan in May 2025, Alice Huang was among a group of tech executives seen dining with Jensen Huang in a local restaurant. During the occasion, Alice Huang entered into the car with him, which then drew away. In October 2025, The New York Times published a story with photographs of Huang meeting Jensen Huang.

The Times reported on November 14, 2026 that after hearing that the newspaper was investigating the affair in September 2025, Jensen Huang wanted to know what the Times was insinuating and was bothered by the suggestion that they were close. His daughter Madison Huang had Nvidia's communications team forcefully push back and contacted Heller, a crisis communications company, with Nvidia maintaining that Alice Huang and Jensen Huang strictly had a business relationship.

On 29 October 2026, The New York Times reported, citing people briefed on U.S. surveillance, that American officials had concluded Huang was a Chinese intelligence asset passing information to Beijing, and that the surveillance had revealed her close relationship with Jensen Huang. On 6 November 2026, The New York Times reported that according to people briefed on the intelligence, a memo had circulated among top U.S. officials that Alice Huang was a spy for China's Ministry of State Security. On 7 November 2026, the Financial Times reported that the U.S. government believed Jensen Huang had a romantic relationship with Alice Huang, and that the U.S. Intelligence Community believed she had been recruited by the MSS.

On 8 November 2026, Jensen Huang sent a corporate email addressed to "my colleagues at Nvidia", apologising for his infidelity without naming the other party. Media houses around the world speculated the possibility of the affair being a sexpionage operation plotted by Alice Huang. The Chinese government denied allegations that Alice Huang was spying for the Chinese government, calling them "pure fabrication out of thin air". According to the Financial Times on 10 November, a Megaspeed executive told them that MSS asked about Alice Huang earlier in 2026 after Singapore started investigating the company for violating customs law, with MSS wanting to find out information about her, including the nature of her business and connections.

After a classified intelligence briefing on 11 November, Congressman Jim Himes, predicted to be the incoming chair of the United States House Permanent Select Committee on Intelligence, expressed doubts on whether Alice Huang was actually a Chinese spy. He stated that when he directly asked Jay Clayton and John Ratcliffe whether a counterintelligence investigation had commenced at the Federal Bureau of Investigation, "they didn't know."

On 11 November 2026, Liu Shih-fang, Minister of the Interior of Taiwan, and Lin Hong-en, the Director of the National Immigration Agency, stated during questioning at the Legislative Yuan, that the Taiwanese authorities had full control over Alice Huang's entry and exit information. On 12 November, the Ministry of the Interior of Taiwan revoked Alice Huang's business-purpose entry permit to Taiwan. Taiwanese officials also started investigating whether her trips included intelligence gathering or whether she violated the Anti-Infiltration Act of Taiwan. The same day, Singapore's Ministry of Home Affairs stated that it barred Alice Huang from entering the country after she gave "inaccurate information" to police. The ministry said that she had not been investigated for espionage.

On 12 November, U.S. Attorney General Todd Blanche said "There’s no conclusions reached by the Department of Justice or by me or by Director Patel around who she is or is not" and stated that Alice Huang being a spy is "something I have never said and that I don’t know to be true. So you assumed that DoJ learns that she is in fact a spy. Nobody said that. I certainly haven’t said that".

The same day, CNN reported, citing multiple sources, that the intelligence collected on Alice Huang did not prove she had been acting as a spy for China, and that officials disagreed about the strength of the evidence that she had been recruited by the MSS. Some officials in the Office of the Director of National Intelligence, including some close to director Jay Clayton, regarded the characterisation of her as a spy as not entirely accurate, and one source said that officials at the Central Intelligence Agency were not yet convinced that the intelligence, including intercepted communications, showed she had knowingly passed information to Beijing. Some officials nonetheless regarded her as a clear counterintelligence risk because of her access to Jensen Huang, and CNN reported that the Federal Bureau of Investigation's counterintelligence investigation was continuing.

The next day, The New York Times reported that people briefed on the intelligence said she appeared to have been an "asset" who secretly provided information to the Ministry of State Security, rather than a trained intelligence officer, and that U.S. intelligence agencies were still assessing when she began working with it, whether willingly or under coercion, and how much she had passed on. According to the Times, she had been under U.S. surveillance for well over a year, and was already in a close relationship with Jensen Huang when it began.
