= 2026 in technology and computing =

Significant events that have occurred in 2026 in all fields of technology, including computing, robotics, electronics, as well as any other areas of technology as well, including any machines, devices, or other technological developments, occurrences, and items.

== January ==
- January 4 – Microsoft CEO Satya Nadella urged consumers to stop calling AI "Slop" and told people to accept AI as the "new equilibrium"
- January 5–9 – The Consumer Electronic Show 2026 takes place
- January 7 –
  - Some of Steve Jobs personal items went up for auction for Apple's 50th anniversary
  - Canadian MPs and Senators urged the Canadian Federal Government to abandon Twitter over a rise in Deepfakes and AI Porn
- January 8 – Ubisoft Halifax was closed by Ubisoft, this came a month after they formed Canada's first video game union

== February ==
- February 23–26 – The Mobile World Congress (MWC) Barcelona 2026 takes place at Fira Barcelona Fira Gran Via, Barcelona, Spain, under the theme "The IQ Era", showcasing the latest in 5G, Internet of things (IoT), and edge computing, drawing over 109,000 attendees from 205 countries.

== March ==
- March 2–5 – Mobile World Congress Barcelona 2026 concludes at Fira Barcelona | Fira Gran Vial, with major announcements in mobile connectivity and artificial intelligence (AI) integration.
- March 16–19 – Nvidia GPU Technology Conference 2026 is held at the SAP center in San Jose, California. Jensen Huang announces $1 trillion in expected orders for Blackwell and Vera Rubin chips through 2027.

== April ==
- April 22-24 - Google Cloud Next 2026 take place at the Mandalay Bay Convention Centre in the Lag Vegas, Nevada, with over 32,000 attendees. Google announces the Gemini Enterprise Agent platform, 8th-generation Tensor processing unit | TPUS and the Agent Data Cloud.
