= Bluefield =

Bluefield may refer to:

- Bluefield, Virginia, US
- Bluefield, West Virginia, US
- Nvidia BlueField, a line of computer hardware

== See also ==
- Bluefields, Nicaragua
- Bluefields, Jamaica
