= DGX =

DGX might refer to:

- Nvidia DGX, a series of super computer nodes
- MOD St Athan (IATA: DGX), a Ministry of Defence airfield connected to the RAF (British Royal Air Force)
- DGX, a division of Dollar General
- Quest Diagnostics (NYSE: DGX)
- A type of bullet, see .460 Weatherby Magnum
- A series of Yamaha portable grand pianos
- D-Generation X, an American professional wrestling stable
