= Vention =

Canadian automation company

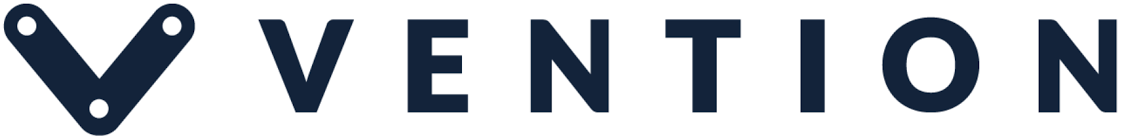
- Type: Private
- Industry: Automation
- Founded: 2016
- Founder: Etienne Lacroix; Max Windisch
- Headquarters: Montreal, Quebec
- Products: Manufacturing Automation Platform; Applications; Automated equipment; Robot cells
- Number of employees: 360
- Website: https://vention.io

Vention is a global industrial automation company headquartered in Montreal, Canada. It supplies an AI-powered full-stack platform that combines engineering software, automation hardware, and physical AI to enable manufacturers to design, deploy, and operate turnkey or custom automation solutions.

The platform includes plug-and-play automation components, cloud-based engineering software, and 3D computer-aided design (CAD) tools. Its physical AI capabilities are powered by GRIIP (Generalized Robotic Industrial Intelligence Pipeline) which integrates Vention's proprietary AI models with Nvidia Isaac foundation models to enable autonomous robotic perception, pose estimation, grasp selection, and motion planning.

As of 2026, Vention has deployed more than 28,000 machines at over 4,000 factories worldwide.

In addition to its Canadian headquarters, Vention maintains international operations, including a European office in Munich, Germany.

== Clients ==
Vention's global customer base encompasses over 4,000 factories around the world, including 90 companies listed on the 2025 Fortune 500. Major enterprise clients include manufacturers across the automotive, aerospace, technology, and consumer goods sectors, such as Toyota, General Electric, Tesla, Siemens, and Airbus, as well as Google, Amazon, Boeing, Lockheed, L'Oréal and The Hershey Company.

Through Vention's cloud-based platform, users design and order custom automated equipment for their production lines, including custom robot workstations, cobots, and industrial palletizers, physical AI, and end-of-line packaging automation.

== History ==
=== Foundation and Series A funding ===
In 2016, Vention was founded in Montreal, Canada by Etienne Lacroix, a former General Electric Co. product manager and McKinsey consultant, and Max Windisch.

In 2017, Vention raised $3.5M USD with support from White Star Capital, Bolt, and Real Ventures. In the same year, Vention announced the beta launch of its 3D CAD software, MachineBuilder.

Vention launched its MachineMotion controller and MachineApps to create a plug-and-play approach when programming equipment motions in 2018. The following year, Vention raised $13M USD in Series A funding, led by Bain Capital Ventures. In the same year, Vention launched MachineLogic, a code-free environment to program, simulate, and deploy industrial automation sequences.

=== Series B funding ===
Vention raised $30M USD in Series B funding in 2020, led by Georgian Partners, Bain Capital Ventures, and White Star Capital. Vention opened an EMEA office in Berlin, Germany in 2021 to provide assistance to manufacturers on both sides of the Atlantic. In the same year, Vention announced alliances with FANUC, OnRobot, and Universal Robots.

In 2022, Vention raised over $95M USD in Series C financing, led by Georgian and Fidelity, and opened a new office in Boston, Massachusetts. In the same year, Vention launched MachineCloud, software for assisted industrial automation deployment.

=== Distribution center ===
Vention opened a new distribution center in Montreal, Canada in 2023 with over 70,000 sq feet to assemble, test, package, and ship all North American orders. In the same year, Vention opened its Vention Experience Center, a training and development center in its Montreal headquarters, to train automation practitioners.

=== Nvidia collaboration ===
In June 2024, Vention announced a collaboration with Nvidia to incorporate Nvidia AI and accelerated computing technologies into its cloud-based Manufacturing Automation Platform (MAP). Together, they would develop AI-powered capabilities including digital twins, generative robot cell design, agentic programming, physics-based simulation, and autonomous robotics. Several products resulting from the collaboration, including MachineMotion AI, were announced later that year.

=== Physical AI innovations ===
In 2025, Vention commercialized MachineMotion AI, an AI-powered automation controller that integrates motion control, safety, industrial networking, and artificial intelligence into a single hardware platform for industrial automation. MachineMotion™ AI is powered by Nvidia Jetson and Nvidia Isaac, CUDA-accelerated libraries, and open models, including Nvidia FoundationPose.

At Nvidia GTC 2025, the company announced its new AI-powered bin picking technology. The commercial launch of Rapid Operator AI took place in 2026. The Physical AI solution for manufacturing developed in collaboration with Nvidia combines Vention's automation platform with Nvidia AI technologies to enable autonomous robot operation for machine tending and other factory-floor applications.

Today, the company's Physical AI capabilities are enabled by GRIIP (Generalized Robotic Industrial Intelligence Pipeline), which integrates Vention's proprietary AI models with Nvidia Isaac foundation models for robotic perception, pose estimation, grasp selection, and collision-free motion planning.

=== Series D funding ===
In January 2026, Vention raised a US$110 million Series D to accelerate the development of Physical AI and expand its unified software and hardware platform for industrial automation. The financing included participation from Investissement Québec, Desjardins Capital, Fidelity Investments Canada, NVentures (Nvidia's venture capital arm) and other financial institutions.

The round brings Vention's total amount raised to more than US$260 million.

=== European headquarters relocation ===
in January 2026, Vention announced that its European headquarters would relocate from Berlin to Munich in the fall of 2026 as part of its continued expansion in Europe.
