= Nvidia GTC =

Semi-annual technology conference held by Nvidia

- Dates: March & November (4–5 days)
- Frequency: Semi-annual
- Venue: San Jose Convention Center
- Location: San Jose, California, U.S.
- Founded: October 2, 2009
- Most recent: March 18, 2025
- Next event: March 16-19, 2026
- Attendance: 25,000 (est.)
- Organizer: Nvidia
- Website: www.nvidia.com/gtc/

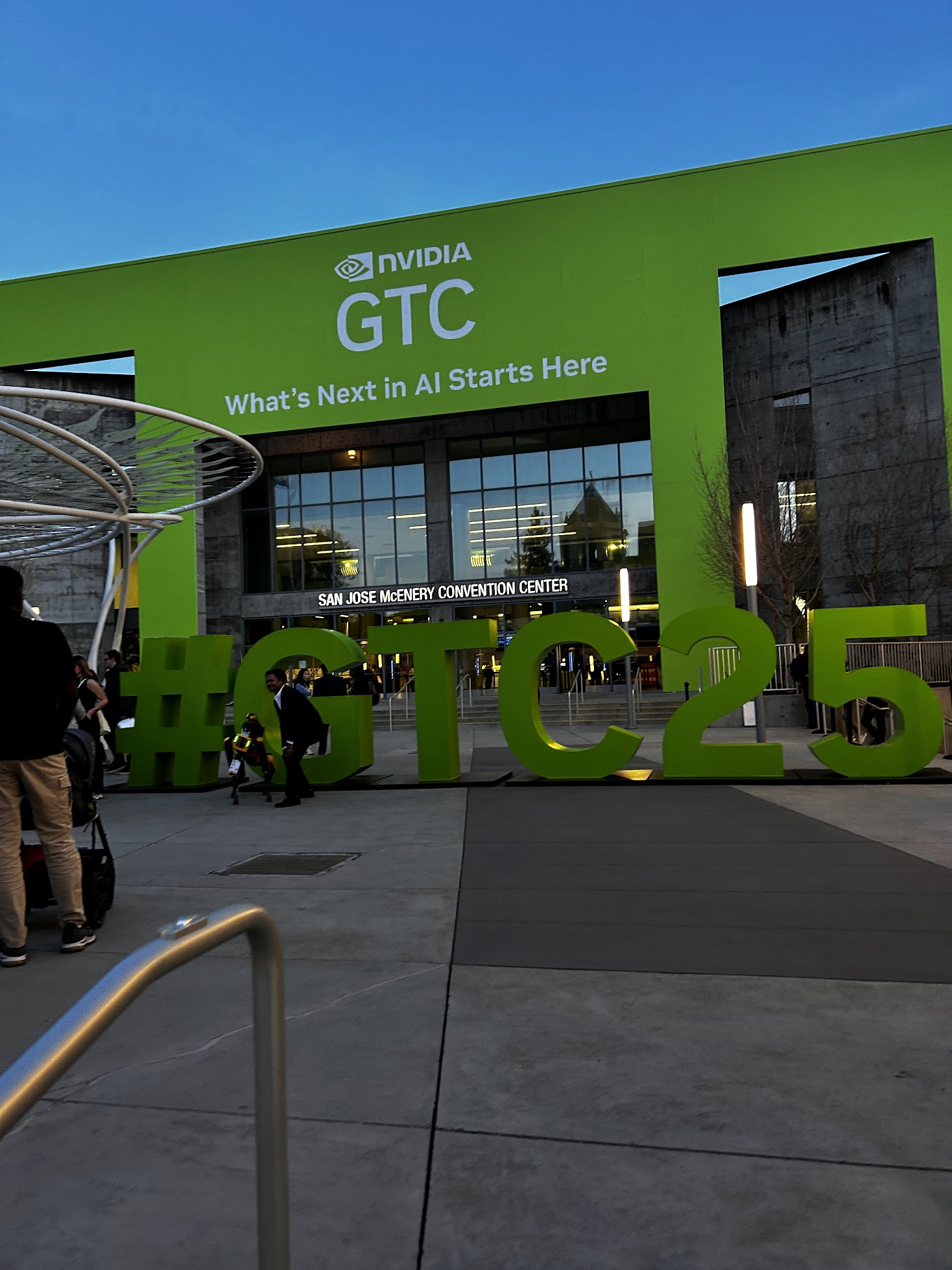
The main entrance installation for Nvidia's GTC 2025 conference, held at the San Jose McEnery Convention Center

Nvidia GTC (GPU Technology Conference) is a global artificial intelligence (AI) conference for developers that brings together developers, engineers, researchers, inventors, and IT professionals. Topics focus on AI, computer graphics, data science, machine learning and autonomous machines. Each conference begins with a keynote from Nvidia CEO and founder Jensen Huang, followed by a variety of sessions and talks with experts from around the world.

It originated in 2009 in San Jose, California, with an initial focus on the potential for solving computing challenges through GPUs. In recent years, the conference focus has shifted to various applications of artificial intelligence and deep learning, including: self-driving cars, healthcare, high performance computing, professional visualization, and Nvidia Deep Learning Institute (DLI) training.

== History ==
The first GTC was held from September 30 to October 2, 2009 at the Fairmont San Jose hotel and attracted roughly 1,500 attendees. The first GTC was so wildly popular that it ended up hosting "several hundred more people" than expected, forcing Nvidia to "shut down registration" at two weeks before the conference. The New York Times later described the atmosphere at the first GTC as akin to a science fair, where academics presented their work on posters.

Since GTC 2009, Nvidia has used the much larger San Jose Convention Center as GTC's primary venue. Along with Nvidia, GTC's size and prominence greatly increased during the AI boom.

According to Nvidia, Huang starts to plan his keynote address about two months before each GTC, to identify what announcements he will make and what things he will present or demonstrate on the stage. But Huang "speaks extemporaneously" while on stage, does not use a script, and does not rehearse in advance.

GTC 2018 attracted over 8,400 attendees. Due to the COVID pandemic of 2020, GTC 2020 was converted to a digital event and drew roughly 59,000 registrants. The 2021 GTC keynote, which was streamed on YouTube on April 12, included a portion that was made with CGI using the Nvidia Omniverse real-time rendering platform. Due to the photorealism of the event, including a model of CEO Jensen Huang, news outlets reported not being able to discern that a portion of the keynote was CGI until later revealed in a blog post on August 11.

GTC 2025 drew about 25,000 attendees to San Jose. To accommodate demand, Huang delivered his keynote address down the street at a hockey arena, SAP Center, which can hold about 17,000 people. By then, GTC and its host company had shifted focus so sharply from graphics to artificial intelligence that Huang himself called GTC the "Super Bowl of A.I." Nvidia wrapped Downtown San Jose in its "neon green and black colors". Demand for San Jose hotel rooms drove prices as high as $2,500 per night. One sign that GTC had evolved from a programmer-oriented developer conference into an executive-oriented business conference for networking and negotiating AI deals was that it took 35 minutes just to get into a nearby building set aside for business meetings. There were long lines everywhere inside the San Jose Convention Center, meaning that GTC may be getting too big for the center. In a joint promotion with Nvidia, Denny's parked its Mobile Diner outside the SAP Center before Huang's keynote address on March 18 and gave out free food samples to celebrate the fact that Nvidia was founded in a booth in a Denny's diner. On March 18, Nvidia also held a night market inspired by Huang's well-known affection for Taiwanese night markets. Thus, on March 18, hard-core attendees had to survive a grueling 12-hour schedule of events to get the full GTC experience.

Event Almanac
Year	Dates	Location	Notable speakers	Announcements
2009	Sep 30–Oct 2	San Jose, CA	Jensen Huang; Richard Kerris; Jon Peddie; Hanspeter Pfister, Harvard University	Fermi microarchitecture; Maybe first keynote ever in 3D; double precision n body simulation demo
2010	Sep 20–23	San Jose Convention Center, San Jose, CA	Jensen Huang; Sebastian Thrun, robotics at Stanford and engineer at Google; Klaus Schulten, computational biologist, Univ. of Illinois, Urbana-Champaign	DX11 Tessellation; Iray on 3DSMax; CUDA x86; Matlab CUDA Accelerated Parallel Computing Toolbox; CUDA roadmap revealed through Maxwell; Quadro graphics cards for video gaming
2011	Dec 14–15	China	Jensen Huang	CUDA
2012	May 14–17	San Jose	Jensen Huang; Iain Couzins (Human Brains and Crowd Behavior), and Part Time Scientists Robert Boehme and Wes Faler (Space)	Kepler microarchitecture; GeForce Grid (GeForce Now)
2013	Mar 18–21	San Jose	Jensen Huang; Erez Lieberman Aiden (genomics pioneer), Ralph V. Gilles (President and CEO of SRT Brand at Chrysler)	Face Works for facial animation
2014	Mar 25	San Jose	Jensen Huang; Dirk Van Gelder; Danny Nahmias, Adam Gazzaley; Oculus CEO Brandon (announced Facebook was acquiring)	NVLink; Pascal microarchitecture; Tegra mobile; Audi drives itself onto stage
2015	Mar 17–20	San Jose	Jensen Huang; Elon Musk; Jeff Dean; Andrew Ng; Andrej Karpathy (director of AI/Computer Vision at Tesla)	Nvidia Drive; Titan X; Voice recognition
2016	Apr 4–8; Sep 28–29	San Jose; Amsterdam	Jensen Huang	Pascal microarchitecture new version; DGX-1; Nvidia Drive PX2; iRay; DGX-2
2017	May 8–11	San Jose; Europe; Israel; Japan	Jensen Huang	Volta Supercomputer; ISAAC Robot Simulator
2018	Mar 26–29	San Jose; Europe; Israel; Japan	Jensen Huang	Clara for healthcare and biomedical research; ARM partnership announce for IoT; RAPIDS Demo
2019	Mar 17–21	San Jose; Europe; Israel; Japan	Jensen Huang	GauGAN for animation; Orin auto AI processor; Self-driving car partnership with Toyota; CUDA-X AI acceleration libraries adopted by PayPal, SAS, Walmart and Microsoft
2020	Oct 5–9	Digital	Jensen Huang	AI Supercomputer for Biomedical Research; Ampere GPUs for visual computing; A100; Artificial Intelligence for Edge and Cloud; ISAAC Demo
2021	Apr 12–16	Digital	Jensen Huang; Geoffrey Hinton; Yann LeCun; Yoshua Bengio	Grace; BMW Virtual Factory; Omniverse Enterprise; SDK for quantum simulations; DGX SuperPOD; Nvidia BlueField 3 DPU
2022	Mar 21–24	Digital	Jensen Huang; Andrew Ng, Dale Durran, Doruk Sonmez	Hopper architecture, H100 GPU, Jetson AGX Orin
2022	Sep 19–22	Digital	Jensen Huang	TBA
2023	Mar 20–23	Digital	Jensen Huang	TBA
2024	Mar 18–21	San Jose	Jensen Huang	Blackwell architecture
2025	Mar 17–21	San Jose	Jensen Huang	NVIDIA Isaac GR00T N1 NVIDIA / General Motors Partnership
2025	May 21-22	Taipei, Taiwan	Jensen Huang	NVIDIA NVLink Fusion NVIDIA RTS PRO Servers Foxconn AI Factory in Partnership with NVIDIA and Taiwan
2025	June 21-22	Paris, France	Jensen Huang	TBA
2025	October 27-29	Washington D.C.	Jensen Huang	TBD - See
2026	March 16-19	San Jose	Jensen Huang	TBA (Date announced at GTC October 2025 Keynote)

== See also ==
- List of artificial intelligence journals
- SIGGRAPH
