= Nvidia Omniverse =

Real-time graphics collaboration platform

Omniverse is a real-time 3D graphics collaboration platform created by Nvidia. It has been used for applications in the visual effects and "digital twin" industrial simulation industries. Omniverse makes extensive use of the Universal Scene Description (USD) format.

== Third-party Integrations ==
Omniverse supports integration with external computer-aided design tools through third-party connectors. For example, academic work has demonstrated a connector linking Omniverse with the open-source CAD system FreeCAD, enabling collaborative access to CAD geometry via the Omniverse Nucleus server and extending Omniverse usage beyond media and entertainment workflows.

== See also ==
- Metaverse
