= Nvidia DGX =

Line of Nvidia produced servers and workstations

DGX
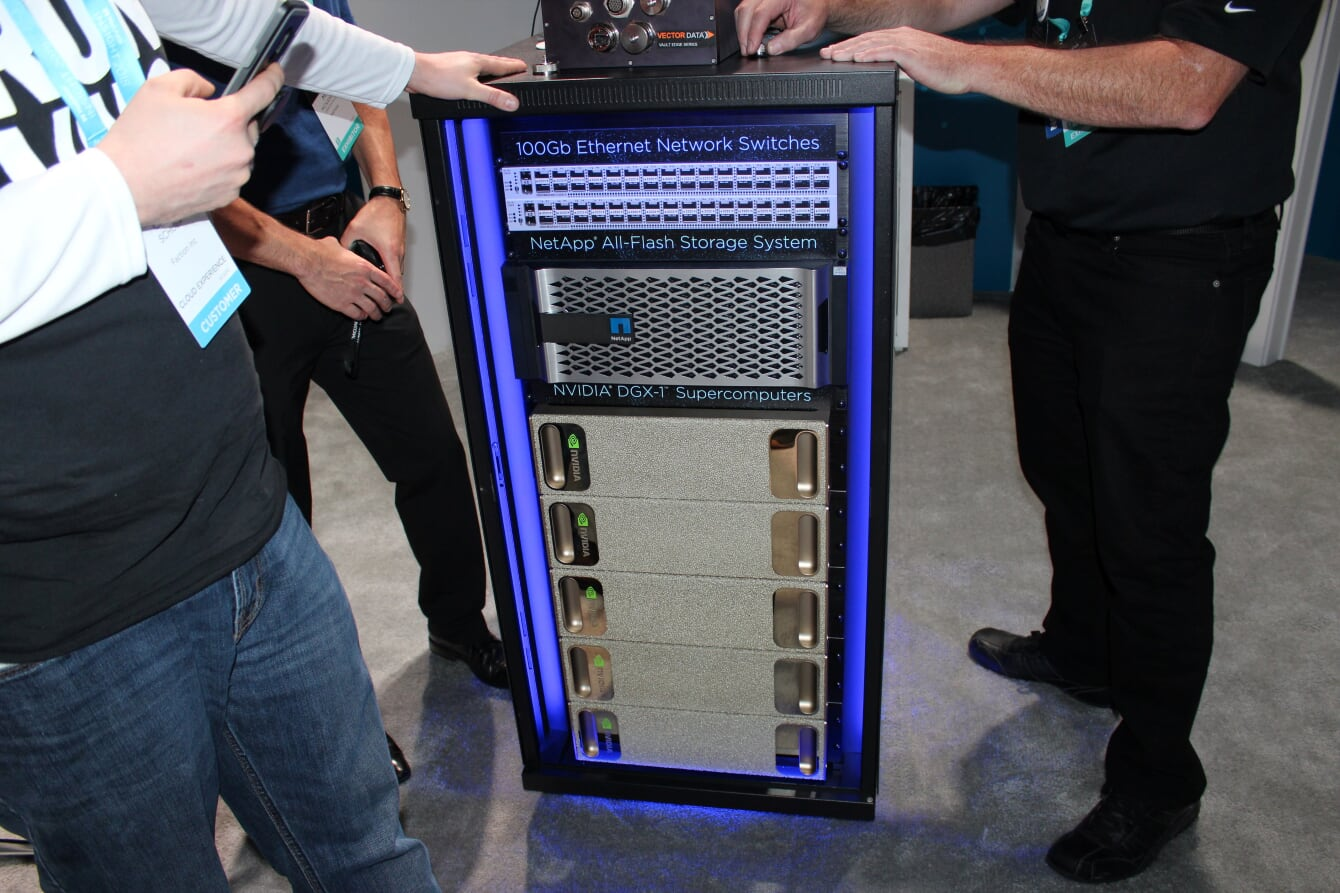
- A rack containing five DGX-1 supercomputers
- Manufacturer: Nvidia
- Released: 2016

The Nvidia DGX (Deep GPU Xceleration) is a series of servers and workstations designed by Nvidia, primarily geared towards enhancing deep learning applications through the use of general-purpose computing on graphics processing units (GPGPU). These systems typically come in a rackmount format, initially using high-performance x86 server CPUs, switching to ARMs around 2018, and releasing NUCs in 2025.

The core feature of a DGX system is its inclusion of 4 to 8 Nvidia Tesla GPU modules, which are housed on an independent system board. These GPUs can be connected either via a version of the SXM socket or a PCIe x16 slot, facilitating flexible integration within the system architecture. To manage the substantial thermal output, DGX units are equipped with heatsinks and fans designed to maintain optimal operating temperatures.

Nvidia GPGPUs are featured in TOP500 supercomputers.

== Models ==
=== Pascal - Volta ===
==== DGX-1 ====
DGX-1 servers feature 8 GPUs based on the Pascal or Volta daughter cards with 128 GB of total HBM2 memory, connected by an NVLink mesh network. The DGX-1 was announced on 6 April 2016. All models are based on a dual socket configuration of Intel Xeon E5 CPUs, and are equipped with the following features.

- 512 GB of DDR4-2133
- Dual 10 Gb networking
- 4 x 1.92 TB SSDs
- 3200W of combined power supply capability
- 3U Rackmount Chassis

The product line is intended to bridge the gap between GPUs and AI accelerators using specific features for deep learning workloads. The initial Pascal-based DGX-1 delivered 170 teraflops of half precision processing, while the Volta-based upgrade increased this to 960 teraflops.

The DGX-1 was first available in only the Pascal-based configuration, with the first generation SXM socket. The later revision of the DGX-1 offered support for first generation Volta cards via the SXM-2 socket. Nvidia offered upgrade kits that allowed users with a Pascal-based DGX-1 to upgrade to a Volta-based DGX-1.

- The Pascal-based DGX-1 has two variants, one with a 16 core Intel Xeon E5-2698 V3, and one with a 20 core E5-2698 V4. Pricing for the variant equipped with an E5-2698 V4 is unavailable, the Pascal-based DGX-1 with an E5-2698 V3 was priced at launch at $129,000
- The Volta-based DGX-1 is equipped with an E5-2698 V4 and was priced at launch at $149,000.

==== DGX Station ====
Designed as a turnkey deskside AI supercomputer, the DGX Station is a tower computer that can function completely independently without typical datacenter infrastructure such as cooling, redundant power, or 19 inch racks.

The DGX station was first available with the following specifications.

- Four Volta-based Tesla V100 accelerators, each with 16 GB of HBM2 memory
- 480 TFLOPS FP16
- Single Intel Xeon E5-2698 v4
- 256 GB DDR4
- 4x 1.92 TB SSDs
- Dual 10 Gb Ethernet

The DGX station is water-cooled to better manage the heat of almost 1500W of total system components, this allows it to keep a noise range below 35 dB under load. This, among other features, made this system a compelling purchase for customers without the infrastructure to run rackmount DGX systems, which can be loud, output a lot of heat, and take up a large area. This was Nvidia's first venture into bringing high performance computing deskside, which has since remained a prominent marketing strategy for Nvidia.

==== DGX-2 ====
The Nvidia DGX-2, the successor to the DGX-1, uses sixteen Volta-based V100 32 GB (second generation) cards in a single unit. It was announced on 27 March 2018. The DGX-2 delivers 2 Petaflops with 512 GB of shared memory for tackling massive datasets and uses NVSwitch for high-bandwidth internal communication. DGX-2 has a total of 512 GB of HBM2 memory, a total of 1.5 TB of DDR4. Also present are eight 100 Gbit/s InfiniBand cards and 30.72 TB of SSD storage, all enclosed within a massive 10U rackmount chassis and drawing up to 10 kW under maximum load. The initial price for the DGX-2 was $399,000.

The DGX-2 differs from other DGX models in that it contains two separate GPU daughterboards, each with eight GPUs. These boards are connected by an NVSwitch system that allows for full bandwidth communication across all GPUs in the system, without additional latency between boards.

A higher performance variant of the DGX-2, the DGX-2H, was offered as well. The DGX-2H replaced the DGX-2's dual Intel Xeon Platinum 8168's with upgraded dual Intel Xeon Platinum 8174's. This upgrade does not increase core count per system, as both CPUs are 24 cores, nor does it enable any new functions of the system, but it does increase the base frequency of the CPUs from 2.7 GHz to 3.1 GHz.

=== Ampere ===
==== DGX A100 Server ====
Announced and released on May 14, 2020. The DGX A100 was the 3rd generation of DGX server, including 8 Ampere-based A100 accelerators. Also included is 15 TB of PCIe gen 4 NVMe storage, 1 TB of RAM, and eight Mellanox-powered 200 GB/s HDR InfiniBand ConnectX-6 NICs. The DGX A100 is in a much smaller enclosure than its predecessor, the DGX-2, taking up only 6 Rack units.

The DGX A100 also moved to a 64 core AMD EPYC 7742 CPU, the first DGX server to not be built with an Intel Xeon CPU. The initial price for the DGX A100 Server was $199,000.

==== DGX Station A100 ====
As the successor to the original DGX Station, the DGX Station A100, aims to fill the same niche as the DGX station in being a quiet, efficient, turnkey cluster-in-a-box solution that can be purchased, leased, or rented by smaller companies or individuals who want to utilize machine learning. It follows many of the design choices of the original DGX station, such as the tower orientation, single socket CPU mainboard, a new refrigerant-based cooling system, and a reduced number of accelerators compared to the corresponding rackmount DGX A100 of the same generation. The price for the DGX Station A100 320G is $149,000 and $99,000 for the 160G model, Nvidia also offers Station rental at ~US$9000 per month through partners in the US (rentacomputer.com) and Europe (iRent IT Systems) to help reduce the costs of implementing these systems at a small scale.

The DGX Station A100 comes with two different configurations of the built in A100.

- Four Ampere-based A100 accelerators, configured with 40 GB (HBM) or 80 GB (HBM2e) memory,
  thus giving a total of 160 GB or 320 GB resulting either in DGX Station A100 variants 160G or 320G.
- 2.5 PFLOPS FP16
- Single 64 Core AMD EPYC 7742
- 512 GB DDR4
- 1 x 1.92 TB NVMe OS drive
- 1 x 7.68 TB U.2 NVMe Drive
- Dual port 10 Gb Ethernet
- Single port 1 Gb BMC port

=== Hopper ===
==== DGX H100 Server ====
Announced March 22, 2022 and planned for release in Q3 2022, The DGX H100 is the 4th generation of DGX servers, built with 8 Hopper-based H100 accelerators, for a total of 32 PFLOPs of FP8 AI compute and 640 GB of HBM3 Memory, an upgrade over the DGX A100s 640GB HBM2 memory. This upgrade also increases VRAM bandwidth to 3 TB/s. The DGX H100 increases the rackmount size to 8U to accommodate the 700W TDP of each H100 SXM card. The DGX H100 also has two 1.92 TB SSDs for Operating System storage, and 30.72 TB of Solid state storage for application data.

One more notable addition is the presence of two Nvidia Bluefield 3 DPUs, and the upgrade to 400 Gbit/s InfiniBand via Mellanox ConnectX-7 NICs, double the bandwidth of the DGX A100. The DGX H100 uses new 'Cedar Fever' cards, each with four ConnectX-7 400 GB/s controllers, and two cards per system. This gives the DGX H100 3.2 Tbit/s of fabric bandwidth across Infiniband.

The DGX H100 has two Xeon Platinum 8480C Scalable CPUs (Codenamed Sapphire Rapids) and 2 Terabytes of System Memory.

The DGX H100 was priced at £379,000 or ~US$482,000 at release.

==== DGX GH200 ====
Announced in May 2023, the DGX GH200 connects 32 Nvidia Hopper Super chips into a singular super-chip which consists totally of 256 H100 GPUs, 32 Grace Neo verse V2 72-core CPUs, 32 OSFT single-port ConnectX-7 VPI with 400 Gbit/s InfiniBand and 16 dual-port BlueField-3 VPI with 200 Gbit/s of Mellanox . Nvidia DGX GH200 is made to handle terabyte-class models for massive recommender systems, generative AI, and graph analytics, offering 19.5 terabyte of shared memory with linear scalability for giant AI models.

==== DGX Helios ====
Announced May 2023, the DGX Helios supercomputer features 4 DGX GH200 systems. Each is interconnected with Nvidia Quantum-2 InfiniBand networking to supercharge data throughput for training large AI models. Helios includes 1,024 H100 GPUs.

=== Blackwell ===
==== DGX GB200 ====
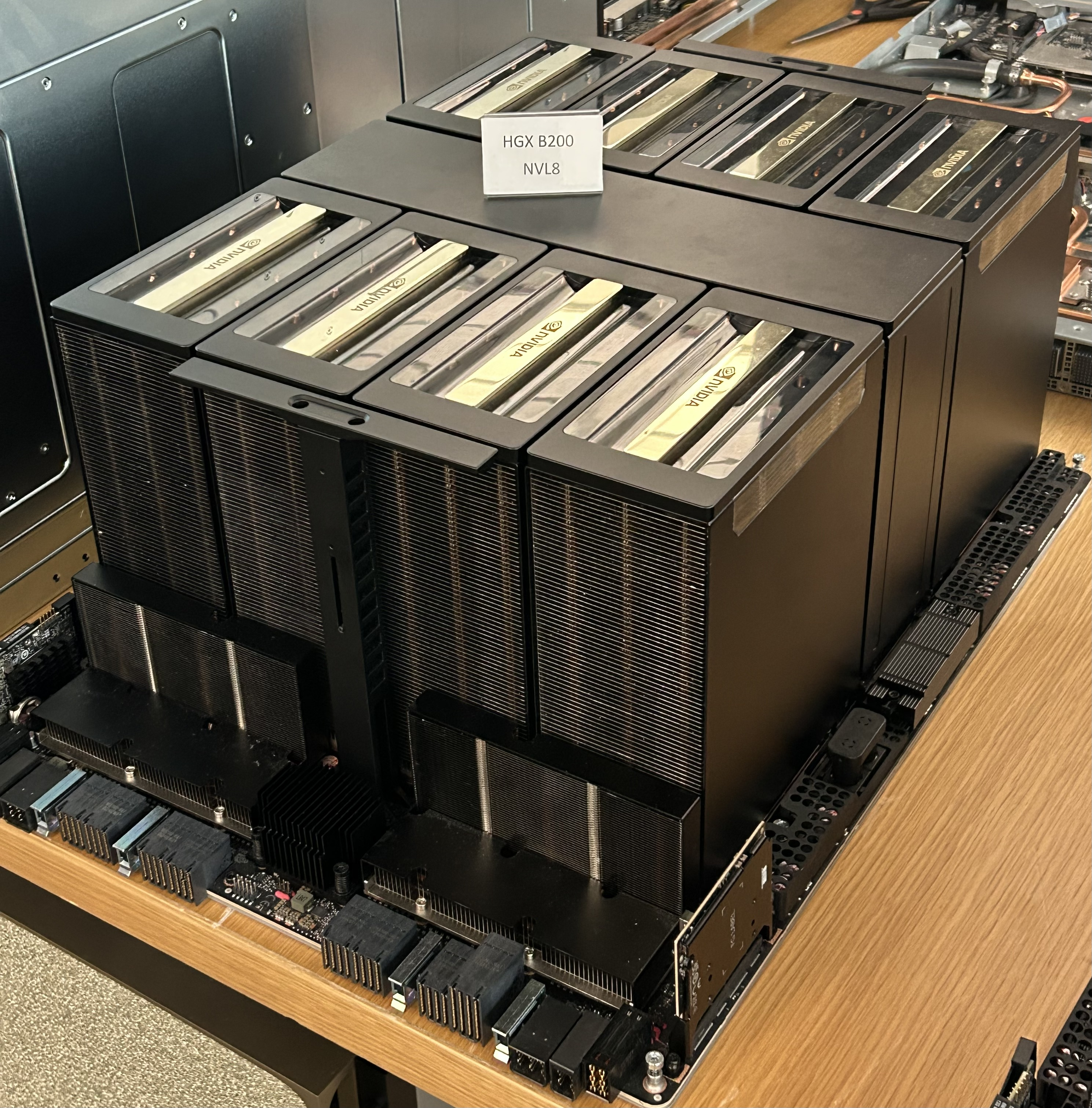
Nvidia DGX B200 8 way GPU Board (air cooled)

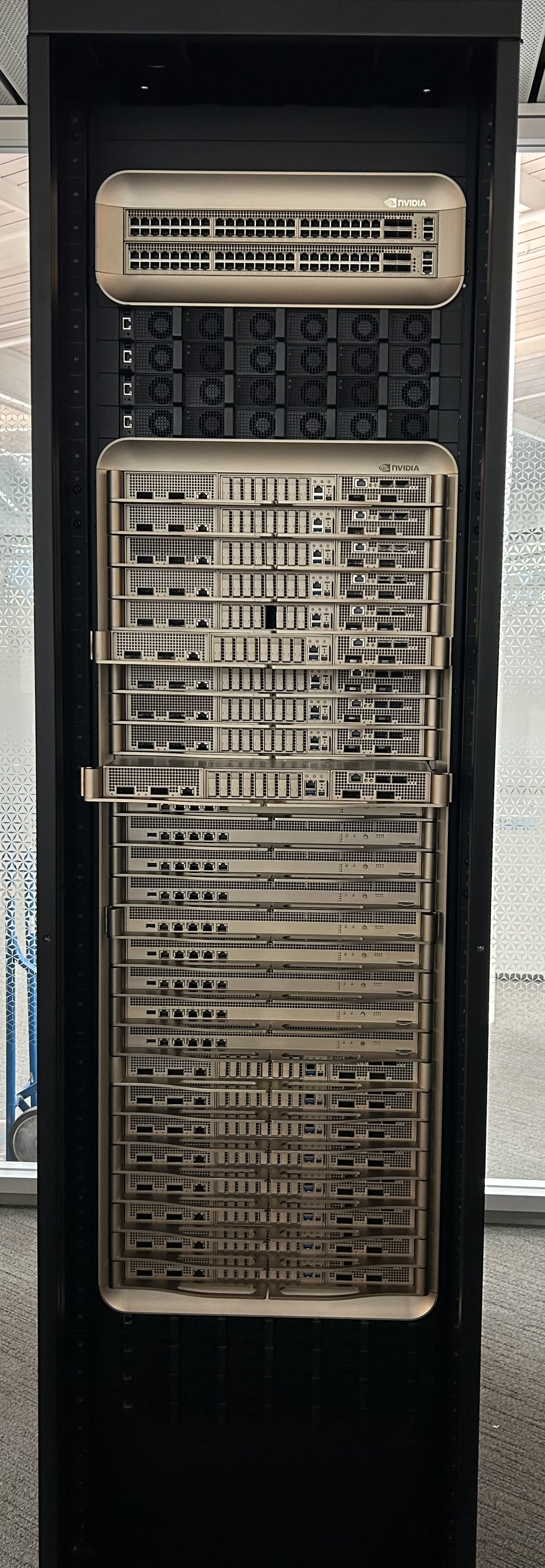
Nvidia GB200 NVL72 rack system

Announced March 2024, GB200 NVL72 connects 36 Grace Arm Neoverse V2 72-core CPUs and 72 B200 GPUs in a rack-scale design. The GB200 NVL72 is a liquid-cooled, rack-scale solution that boasts a 72-GPU NVLink domain that acts as a single massive GPU. Nvidia DGX GB200 offers 13.5 TB HBM3e of shared memory with linear scalability for giant AI models, less than its predecessor DGX GH200.

==== DGX SuperPod ====
The DGX Superpod is a high performance turnkey supercomputer system provided by Nvidia using DGX hardware. It combines DGX compute nodes with fast storage and high bandwidth networking to provide a solution to high demand machine learning workloads. The Selene supercomputer, at the Argonne National Laboratory, is one example of a DGX SuperPod-based system.

Selene, built from 280 DGX A100 nodes, ranked 5th on the TOP500 list for most powerful supercomputers at the time of its completion in June 2020. The new Hopper-based SuperPod can scale to 32 DGX H100 nodes, for a total of 256 H100 GPUs and 64 x86 CPUs. This gives the complete SuperPod 20 TB of HBM3 memory, 70.4 TB/s of bisection bandwidth, and up to 1 ExaFLOP of FP8 AI compute. These SuperPods can then be further joined to create larger supercomputers.

The Eos supercomputer, designed, built, and operated by Nvidia, was constructed of 18 H100-based SuperPods, totaling 576 DGX H100 systems, 500 Quantum-2 InfiniBand switches, and 360 NVLink Switches, that allow Eos to deliver 18 EFLOPs of FP8 compute, and 9 EFLOPs of FP16 compute, making Eos the 5th fastest AI supercomputer in the world, according to TOP500 (November 2023 edition).

As Nvidia does not produce any storage devices or systems, Nvidia SuperPods rely on partners to provide high performance storage. Current storage partners for Nvidia Superpods are Dell EMC, DDN, HPE, IBM, NetApp, Pavilion Data, and VAST Data.

==== DGX Spark ====
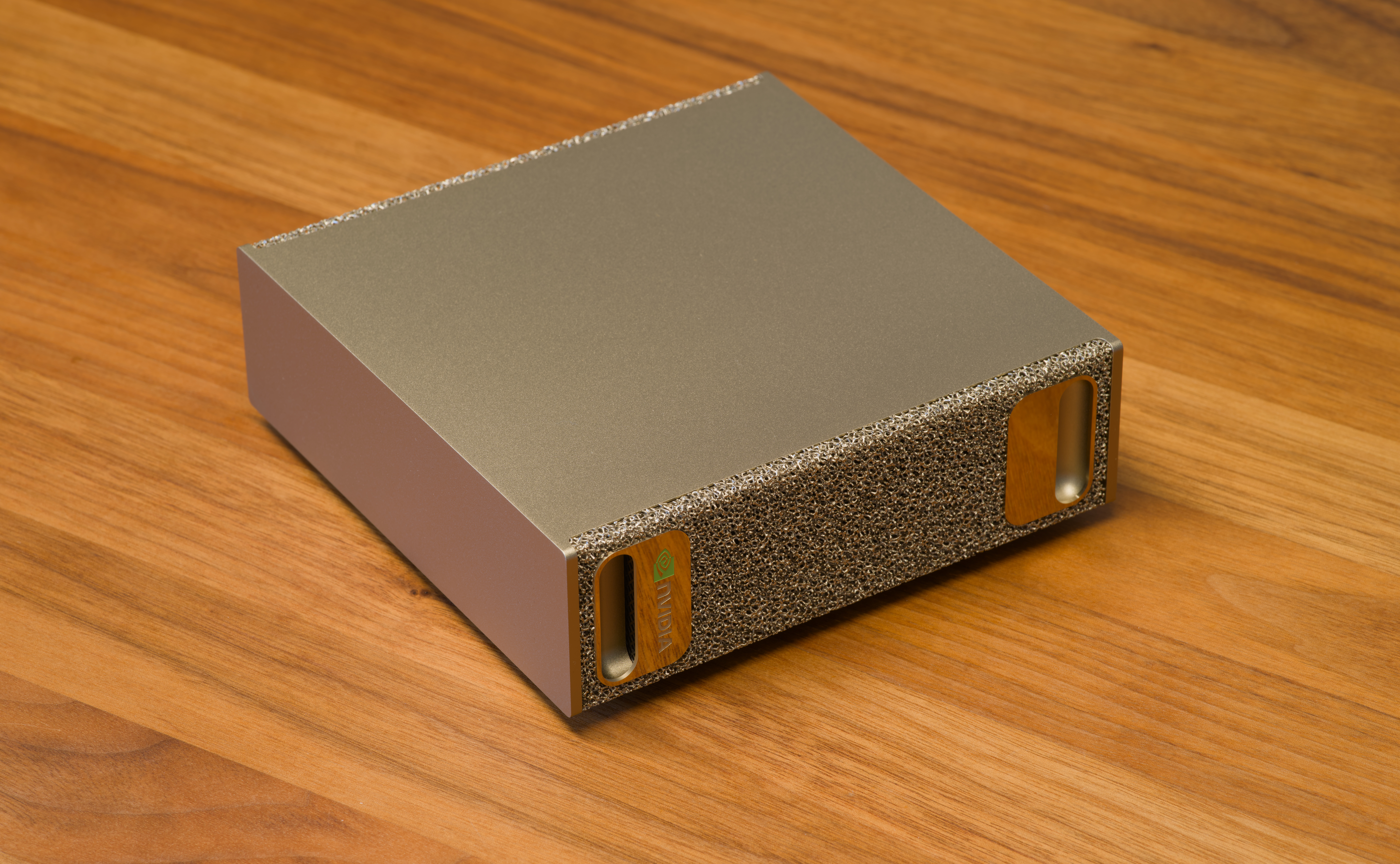
NVIDIA DGX Spark with ConnectX-7 NIC

In March 2025, Nvidia also announced the DGX Spark (previously DIGITS), a "desktop AI Supercomputer" based on Blackwell Grace CPU consists of ARM cores and a built-in iGPU called Nvidia GB10 Super chip. These machines are targeted at AI researchers and programmers and have 128 GB of integrated RAM, making it possible to train or fine-tune fairly large models ("up to 200 billion parameters" with quantization). Several partner manufacturers also offer versions of the DGX Spark.

==== DGX Station ====
The DGX Station is an upcoming Desk side AI Supercomputer based on the GB300 superchip - a Blackwell GPU and a Grace CPU, consisting of 72 Neoverse V2 ARM cores. These machines are targeted at AI researchers, programmers and for other users of AI technology, and have 748 GB of integrated RAM, making it possible to train or fine-tune fairly large models ("up to 1 trillion parameters" with quantization). 252 GB of these 748 GB of memory are HBM3e memory connected to the Blackwell GPU at 7.1 TB/s memory bandwidth. Several partner manufacturers offer versions of the DGX Station. The first deliveries to a broader user base will start from August of 2026, the price is cited as between $100.000 to $120.000 (as of July 2026), depending on the vendor and storage and GPU options.

== Accelerators ==
Starting from P100, to V100, to A100, to H100, to B200 and to R100; the comparison of accelerators used in DGX:

=== General & Architecture ===
Model	Architecture	Socket	GPU	Fabrication Process	Transistor count (billion)	Die size (mm^{2})	Launched
P100	Pascal	SXM/SXM2	GP100	TSMC 16FF+	15.3	610	Q2 2016
V100 16GB	Volta	SXM2	GV100	TSMC 12FFN	21.1	815	Q3 2017
V100 32GB	Volta	SXM3	GV100	TSMC 12FFN	21.1	815	Q3 2017
A100 40GB	Ampere	SXM4	GA100	TSMC N7	54.2	826	Q1 2020
A100 80GB	Ampere	SXM4	GA100	TSMC N7	54.2	826	Q4 2020
H100	Hopper	SXM5	GH100	TSMC 4N	80	814	Q3 2022
H200	Hopper	SXM5	GH100	TSMC 4N	80	814	Q3 2023
B100	Blackwell	SXM6	GB100	TSMC 4NP	208	N/A	Q4 2024
B200	Blackwell	SXM6	GB100	TSMC 4NP	208	N/A	Q4 2024
R100	Rubin	SXM7	—N/a	TSMC 3N	338	—N/a	H2 2026

=== Cores, Clock & Power ===
Model	Boost clock (MHz)	#SM	Cores (FP32 CUDA)	Cores (FP64 excl. tensor)	Cores (Mixed INT32/FP32)	Cores (INT32)	TDP (W)
P100	1480	56	3584	1792	—N/a	—N/a	300
V100 16GB	1530	80	5120	2560	N/A	5120	300
V100 32GB	1530	80	5120	2560	N/A	5120	350
A100 40GB	1410	108	6912	3456	6912	N/A	400
A100 80GB	1410	108	6912	3456	6912	N/A	400
H100	1980	132	16896	4608	16896	N/A	700
H200	1980	132	16896	4608	16896	N/A	1000
B100	—N/a	—N/a	—N/a	—N/a	—N/a	—N/a	700
B200	—N/a	—N/a	—N/a	—N/a	—N/a	—N/a	1000
R100	—N/a	—N/a	—N/a	—N/a	—N/a	—N/a	2300

=== Memory & Cache ===
Model	Memory Type (HBM)	VRAM Size (GB)	Memory Speed (Gb/s)	Bus width (bits)	Bandwidth (TB/s)	L1 Cache Per SM (KB)	L1 Cache Total (KB)	L2 Cache (KB)
P100	HBM2	16	1.4	4096	0.72	24	1344	4096
V100 16GB	HBM2	16	1.75	4096	0.9	128	10240	6144
V100 32GB	HBM2	32	1.75	4096	0.9	128	10240	6144
A100 40GB	HBM2	40	2.4	5120	1.52	192	20736	40960
A100 80GB	HBM2e	80	3.2	5120	1.52	192	20736	40960
H100	HBM3	80	5.2	5120	3.35	192	25344	51200
H200	HBM3e	141	6.3	6144	4.8	192	25344	51200
B100	HBM3e	192	8	8192	8	N/A	N/A	N/A
B200	HBM3e	192	8	8192	8	N/A	N/A	N/A
R100	HBM4	—N/a	—N/a	—N/a	—N/a	—N/a	—N/a	—N/a

=== Compute Performance, Interconnect & Networking ===
Model	FP32 (TFLOPS)	FP64 (TFLOPS)	INT8 dense tensor	FP16 dense tensor	bfloat16 dense tensor	TF32 dense tensor	FP64 dense tensor	Interconnect (NVLink; TB/s)	Networking
P100	10.6	5.3	—N/a	21.2	—N/a	—N/a	—N/a	0.16	ConnectX-4 (100 Gb/s)
V100 16GB	15.7	7.8	N/A	125 TFLOPS	N/A	N/A	N/A	0.3	ConnectX-5 (100 Gb/s)
V100 32GB	15.7	7.8	N/A	125 TFLOPS	N/A	N/A	N/A	0.3	ConnectX-5 (100 Gb/s)
A100 40GB	19.5	9.7	624 TOPS	312 TFLOPS	312 TFLOPS	156 TFLOPS	19.5 TFLOPS	0.6	ConnectX-6 (200 Gb/s)
A100 80GB	19.5	9.7	624 TOPS	312 TFLOPS	312 TFLOPS	156 TFLOPS	19.5 TFLOPS	0.6	ConnectX-6 (200 Gb/s)
H100	67	34	1.98 POPS	990 TFLOPS	990 TFLOPS	495 TFLOPS	67 TFLOPS	0.9	ConnectX-7 (400 Gb/s)
H200	67	34	1.98 POPS	990 TFLOPS	990 TFLOPS	495 TFLOPS	67 TFLOPS	0.9	ConnectX-7 (400 Gb/s)
B100	—N/a	—N/a	3.5 POPS	1.98 PFLOPS	1.98 PFLOPS	989 TFLOPS	30 TFLOPS	1.8	ConnectX-7 (400 Gb/s)
B200	—N/a	—N/a	4.5 POPS	2.25 PFLOPS	2.25 PFLOPS	1.2 PFLOPS	40 TFLOPS	1.8	ConnectX-7 (400 Gb/s)
R100	—N/a	—N/a	—N/a	—N/a	—N/a	—N/a	—N/a	—N/a	ConnectX-9 (1600 Gb/s)

== See also ==
- Deep Learning Super Sampling
- AMD Instinct
