= VAST Data =

Developer of computer storage management software

- Type: Private
- Industry: Computer software, AI infrastructure
- Founded: January 2016; 10 years ago
- Key people: Renen Hallak (CEO); Shachar Fienblit (VP R&D); Jeff Denworth (Co-Founder); Alon Horev (CTO)
- Number of employees: 1,000 (2025)
- Website: vastdata.com

VAST Data is a privately owned company that develops software for artificial intelligence infrastructure and data management. The company's products are used to support data-intensive workloads across AI data centers ("neoclouds"), hyperscalers, and enterprises.

== History ==
VAST Data was founded in January 2016. launched its storage software in 2019. Following the launch of ChatGPT in late 2022 and the subsequent AI boom, the company became a storage supplier to AI data centers.

The company was ranked third on the Financial Times 2023 list of The Americas' Fastest-Growing Companies, and has been included in the 2025 CNBC Disruptor 50 and the Forbes AI 50.

The software can be deployed in data centers, in public clouds, and in edge computing environments, and is sold on a subscription basis.

VAST supplies data management software to enterprises, hyperscalers and cloud computing providers. In November 2025, hyperscaler CoreWeave signed a $1.17 billion commercial agreement with the company. Mistral AI uses VAST storage in its Nvidia GB300 NVL72 systems.

== See also ==
- AI build-out financing, how projects to build AI datacenters are financed
- AI boom, period of rapid progress and investment in artificial intelligence
- Generative AI, AI model that generates a response using probability and statistics
- Large language model, a form of generative AI
- Text-to-video model
