= Data processing unit =

Programmable electronic component

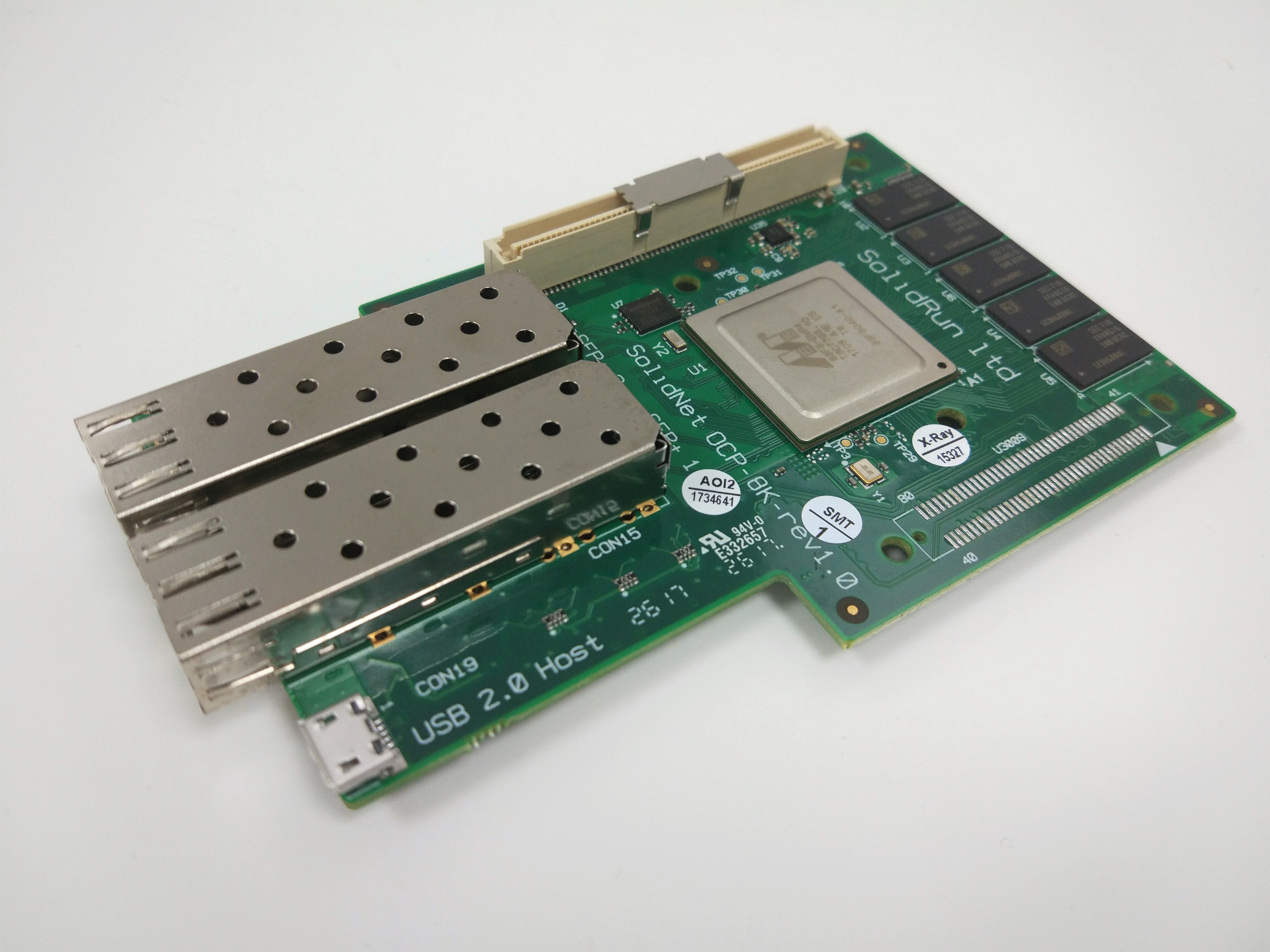
SolidRun's SolidNet OCP-8K SmartNIC

A data processing unit (DPU) is a programmable computer processor that tightly integrates a general-purpose CPU with network interface hardware. They are also occasionally called "IPUs" (infrastructure processing unit) or "SmartNICs". They can be used in place of traditional NICs to relieve the main CPU of complex networking responsibilities and other "infrastructural" duties; although their features vary, they may be used to perform encryption/decryption, serve as a firewall, handle TCP/IP, process HTTP requests, or even function as a hypervisor or storage controller.

These devices can be attractive to cloud computing providers whose servers might otherwise spend a significant amount of CPU time on these tasks, cutting into the cycles they can provide to guests. They see use in other kinds of data center environments as well due to their improved power consumption efficiency for routine networking tasks compared to general-purpose CPUs.

Modern DPUs may integrate an operating-system-capable general-purpose CPU with DRAM and storage directly into a high-speed NIC datapath. Such devices can provide network throughput in the 100–400 Gbit/s range, although their CPU cores are generally less powerful than those of the host processor.

== See also ==
- Compute Express Link (CXL)
