= AI build-out financing =

How data centre buildout is being financed

To finance the build-out of AI data centres during the 2020s, an unprecedented amount of capital has been mobilised in the USA in particular amid a broad competition for global technological supremacy in artificial intelligence. By September 2026, analysis showed AI capital spending was larger and faster than during any previous technological boom. Early AI investment was funded primarily with operating cash flow, but by 2026 the bond market came to dominate the financing. The surge in new AI debt increased borrowing costs across other sectors of the economy.

Citigroup forecast in December 2025 that $2.8 trillion of capital would be spent for AI data centre infrastructure in the US by 2030, while McKinsey estimated that almost $7 trillion would be spent globally by that time. In 2026, American hyperscalers such as Microsoft, Amazon and Google's parent Alphabet were expected to spend $764 billion on AI infrastructure. Their Chinese counterparts were second at $102 billion.

The Wall Street Journal reported in August 2026 that nine firms spending on AI had some $3 trillion in off-balance-sheet purchasing and lease contractual commitments extending decades into the future, about triple the amount of traditional debt and leases. The commitments were disclosed as footnotes rather than financial statement line items.

"Circular financing" reminiscent of vendor financing of the dotcom era has become a prominent feature of the AI build-out in the mid-2020s, as chipmakers and cloud-computing providers have extended capital, guarantees and purchase commitments to the companies that buy their hardware and services. The practice is most closely associated with Nvidia, whose graphics processing units (GPUs) power most hyperscaler training and inference, and with "frontier labs," a term used for AI developers building the most advanced large language models, principally OpenAI and Anthropic. Because hyperscalers and frontier labs are simultaneously one another's investors, suppliers and customers, commentators have described the resulting arrangements as circular. The Wall Street Journal reported the circularity "can be virtuous on the upside, and vicious on the downside."

== Circular financing ==
A circular deal typically involves one company—often a chip manufacturer or cloud provider—taking an equity stake in, or extending financing to, a firm that in turn commits to buy that same company's products or services. (Note: Bloomberg's explainer distinguishes a circular deal of this kind from a fraudulent "round-trip" transaction, a term used by regulators for sham trades with no economic substance designed to inflate reported results.) Nvidia has been described as "particularly aggressive" in this respect, investing in AI startups, funding infrastructure buildouts, and taking stakes in data-centre and "neocloud" companies that rent out access to its chips. Examples cited by Bloomberg include Nvidia's investments in Nscale, Nebius, CoreWeave (in which it also agreed to buy $6.3 billion of cloud services), Safe Superintelligence and Naver, as well as up to $100 billion pledged toward OpenAI (of which it ultimately contributed $30 billion to a funding round) and up to $15 billion pledged jointly with Microsoft toward Anthropic. Similar dynamics have linked Microsoft and OpenAI (which has committed to purchase $250 billion of Microsoft cloud services), Amazon and Google with Anthropic, and AMD with both OpenAI and Anthropic.

Proponents argue such arrangements function as a "virtuous circle" or flywheel: capital from a supplier lets a customer expand, which in turn generates more demand for the supplier's products, at a time when the most advanced AI chips remain scarce and companies seek to lock in supply through financing tied to long-term purchase commitments. Anthropic chief executive Dario Amodei defended the practice on similar grounds, saying that one party has capital and a commercial interest in selling chips while the other expects future revenue but lacks the up-front capital.

Critics counter that circularity can distort incentives: a company with a major shareholder among its own suppliers may be more inclined to keep purchasing that supplier's products regardless of commercial merit, and if a customer's own revenue fails to keep pace with its data-centre and hardware bills, the supplier-investor can lose twice—once as its customer stops buying, and again as the value of its equity stake falls. Bloomberg noted this risk is heightened in AI infrastructure because a relatively small number of buyers account for a large share of the market.

=== Circular investments ===
Beyond loan guarantees and lease-financing structures, chipmakers and their customers have exchanged direct equity stakes and warrants on a large scale, producing cross-shareholdings across the sector. The research firm IDC defined the resulting pattern as one "where the same capital flows simultaneously as vendor payment and equity stake," such that a company "funds its own customer's revenue while also supplying that customer's core infrastructure," producing revenue growth that IDC described as real but not cleanly separable from the investing company's own capital deployment.

Nvidia has been the most prolific corporate investor in this sector. Between 2021 and 2025 it participated in 283 funding rounds across 241 companies, roughly 85% of them AI startups, making it the fourth-largest corporate venture investor of 2023 behind Microsoft, SoftBank and Alphabet; all ten of the most heavily funded private companies on the Forbes AI 50 list, including competitors OpenAI and Anthropic, had received Nvidia investment. Its disclosed positions include a roughly $30 billion stake in OpenAI, built alongside agreements for OpenAI to purchase Nvidia systems; a 7% stake in CoreWeave alongside a $6.3 billion cloud-services purchase commitment; and $2 billion positions each in Nebius, Marvell Technology, Synopsys, Coherent and Lumentum, along with smaller stakes of up to $2.1 billion in Iren and up to $3.2 billion in Corning. Nvidia also disclosed $5 billion invested in Safe Superintelligence and $1 billion in Naver, and was a repeat investor in Mistral AI, Cohere and Perplexity AI.

Nvidia's two largest disclosed equity positions outside the AI-software sector are in fellow hardware suppliers. It finalised a roughly $5 billion, 4% stake in Intel in late 2025 (214.7 million shares at $23.28 each), tied to joint development of x86 central processing units incorporating Nvidia's NVLink interconnect and of system-on-chips combining Intel processor cores with Nvidia RTX graphics chiplets; that stake was valued at roughly $19.9 billion as of 19 August 2026 after Intel's share price rose sharply, having peaked at more than $30 billion in late June. Separately, Nvidia disclosed a stake of nearly $21 billion in SpaceX (122.8 million shares at $170.86 each) in August 2026, making it the company's sixth-largest outside investor; the position originated as a $10 billion investment in xAI that converted into SpaceX shares once SpaceX acquired xAI, and had fallen in value to roughly $17.2 billion as of 19 August 2026 as SpaceX's private share price declined. Reporting on the stake noted that SpaceX builds its own AI data centres exclusively with Nvidia chips.

Other chipmakers have taken comparable positions in their own customers. Microsoft had invested more than $13 billion in OpenAI by the mid-2020s, the largest tranche – $10 billion – in a 2023, alongside OpenAI's commitment to purchase $250 billion of Microsoft cloud services. Amazon and Google committed up to $4 billion and $2 billion respectively to Anthropic in 2023, and Amazon separately agreed in 2026 to invest $15 billion in OpenAI with a further $35 billion pledged conditionally. Microsoft and Nvidia jointly pledged up to $15 billion toward Anthropic in late 2025. In July 2026, AMD announced it would invest up to $5 billion in Anthropic as part of a deal under which Anthropic would deploy 2 gigawatts of AMD Instinct MI450-series GPUs in AMD's Helios rack-scale systems, with the first gigawatt due in the first half of 2027. AMD had separately issued OpenAI a warrant for up to 160 million shares of AMD common stock – equivalent to roughly 10% of the company – with vesting tied to both the volume of AMD hardware OpenAI deployed and the performance of AMD's own share price.

These equity exchanges have run alongside, and in some cases overlapped with, a wider set of compute-purchase commitments. Anthropic alone entered a $1.25 billion-a-month agreement through May 2029 for exclusive use of the computing capacity at SpaceX's Colossus 1 data centre in Memphis, Tennessee; a multi-billion-dollar agreement with Amazon; a multi-gigawatt compute agreement with Google and Broadcom; and, according to CNBC, preliminary talks to lease computing power from Meta, while reporting a revenue run-rate of $47 billion by May 2026 (up from about $10 billion for the whole of 2025) and closing a funding round that month worth $965 billion.

Commentators have noted that these overlapping stakes concentrate risk as well as opportunity: because Nvidia and other chipmakers hold equity in many of the same companies that buy their hardware, a slowdown in AI spending could reduce both their product revenue and the value of their investment portfolios simultaneously, deepening rather than diversifying their exposure to a downturn in the sector. Reporting has also noted that, because Nvidia and its peers can build influence over customers and competitors through minority equity stakes rather than outright acquisitions, such arrangements can fall outside regulatory scrutiny that would apply to a full acquisition.

==== Summary of major disclosed stakes ====
Selected equity stakes and warrants disclosed among AI chipmakers, cloud providers and AI developers
Date	Investor	Investee	Stake / amount (Note: The table is necessarily a snapshot: some figures (notably the Intel and SpaceX stake valuations) fluctuate with the investee's own share price and were current only as of the reporting date shown, while several other Nvidia positions are dated only to "2021–2025" or "as of August 2026" in the underlying reporting and could not be pinned to a specific transaction date from the sources reviewed.)	Quid pro quo (commercial component)	Source
2019–2023 (largest tranche 2023)	Microsoft	OpenAI	>$13 billion cumulative (incl. $10 billion in 2023)	OpenAI committed to purchase $250 billion of Microsoft cloud services	
2023	Amazon	Anthropic	Up to $4 billion	Anthropic committed to use Amazon Web Services for AI training	
2023	Google	Anthropic	Up to $2 billion	Anthropic committed to use Google's chips and cloud services	
2024	Nvidia	Mistral AI	Undisclosed (one of three funding rounds)	Continued reliance on Nvidia chips	
2024–2025	Nvidia	OpenAI	~$30 billion contributed (from an up-to-$100 billion pledge)	Agreements for OpenAI to purchase Nvidia systems	
2025	Nvidia	CoreWeave	7% equity stake	Nvidia agreed to buy $6.3 billion of CoreWeave cloud services	
2025	Nvidia	Nscale, Nebius	Undisclosed / ~$2 billion (Nebius)	Continued use of Nvidia chips in neocloud infrastructure	
Late 2025	Nvidia	Intel	~$5 billion (4% stake; 214.7 million shares at $23.28 each)	Joint development of x86 CPUs with NVLink integration and Intel–Nvidia RTX system-on-chips	
Late 2025	Microsoft and Nvidia (joint)	Anthropic	Up to $15 billion combined	Anthropic to draw on Microsoft and Nvidia chips and cloud capacity	
n.d. (disclosed July 2026)	AMD	OpenAI	Warrant for up to 160 million shares (~10% of AMD)	OpenAI to deploy AMD chips; vesting tied to deployment volume and AMD's share price	
2026	Amazon	OpenAI	$15 billion invested; further $35 billion pledged conditionally	Commercial agreement for OpenAI to draw on Amazon computing capacity	
2026	Nvidia	Safe Superintelligence	$5 billion	Reliance on Nvidia chips for model training	
2026	Nvidia	Naver	$1 billion	Reliance on Nvidia chips	
July 2026	AMD	Anthropic	Up to $5 billion	Anthropic to deploy 2 gigawatts of AMD Instinct MI450-series GPUs in AMD Helios systems	
August 2026 (originated as a $10 billion xAI stake)	Nvidia	SpaceX	~$21 billion (122.8 million shares at $170.86 each)	SpaceX builds its AI data centres exclusively with Nvidia chips	
n.d. (as of August 2026)	Nvidia	Marvell Technology, Synopsys, Coherent, Lumentum	$2 billion each	Continued use of Nvidia hardware and platforms	
n.d. (as of August 2026)	Nvidia	IREN	Up to $2.1 billion	Data-centre capacity built around Nvidia hardware	
n.d. (as of August 2026)	Nvidia	Corning	Up to $3.2 billion	Optical connectivity components for Nvidia-based data centres	
n.d. (as of August 2026)	Nvidia	Cohere, Perplexity AI	Undisclosed (four separate rounds each)	Continued reliance on Nvidia chips	

=== Nvidia's asset-backed financing plan ===
In August 2026, Nvidia chief executive Jensen Huang announced a strategic partnership with six major asset managers – Apollo Global Management, BlackRock, Blackstone, Brookfield Asset Management, Goldman Sachs and KKR to standardise chip financing through securitisation of $500 billion package for AI companies. Likening Nvidia chips to investable commercial real estate, he explained: "because it’s productive, it’s revenue generating, it is fungible, it’s used by just about every cloud service provider, it runs every AI model.” Under one model outlined by executives, investors would buy asset-backed securities, which would be used to fund data centre construction and hardware, and lease it to an end customer (such as OpenAI or AWS); lease payments from the customer would flow back through the SPV to repay investors. Loans would be backed by the Nvidia hardware itself as collateral, on the premise that if one customer defaulted, another could quickly take its place given demand for the chips. BlackRock chief executive Larry Fink compared the moment to the early growth of the mortgage-backed security market in the 1970s.

Huang said the arrangement was designed to address criticism of Nvidia's earlier circular funding deals, under which the company had invested directly in, or guaranteed financing for, its own customers. He said Nvidia might still backstop up to 25% of a project's cost through a "residual-value support mechanism," under which the company would make up the difference if collateral backing a loan fell below an agreed floor—an arrangement that would likely keep the obligation off Nvidia's balance sheet initially while leaving it exposed if an end customer defaulted. Some analysts, including Morgan Stanley's Joseph Moore, characterised the addition of third-party capital and credit decisions as likely to "alleviate circularity concerns...while admittedly polarizing the debate." Rival chipmaker Broadcom had already provided a comparable backstop, disclosing up to $29 billion of exposure, on a $35 billion package arranged by Apollo, Blackstone and a group of banks to lease chips to Anthropic in June 2026.

=== Credit-default-swap market signals ===
By mid-2026, participants in the credit default swap (CDS) market—where investors trade contracts that function as a form of insurance against a borrower defaulting on its debt, with the price (quoted in basis points) rising as perceived default risk increases—began treating Nvidia's spread as a barometer for stress in AI-related vendor financing generally. (Note: A credit default swap spread of, say, 100 basis points implies an annual premium of roughly 1% of the insured notional to protect against default; a rising spread signals that the market views default as more likely, even where the underlying company remains highly profitable.) Nvidia's five-year CDS reached a record 82 basis points on 27 July 2026, according to ICE Data Services, its largest single-day intraday move since the contract began actively trading in November 2025; the spread had stood at roughly 40 basis points at the start of that month and around 68 basis points three days earlier. One equity trader, Daniel O'Regan of Mizuho, remarked that he had not previously monitored Nvidia's CDS at all, given the company's size and profitability, until the spread's rapid rise prompted him to.

The move coincided with reporting, credited to Bloomberg News and citing unnamed sources, that Nvidia was negotiating AI infrastructure arrangements potentially worth more than $750 billion in aggregate, including a possible $250 billion guarantee to support OpenAI's lease of capacity at a planned Ohio data centre and a separate facility to help finance $350 billion of OpenAI chip purchases; the Financial Times separately reported that Nvidia was backing a $50 billion lease on a Texas data centre built around its own chips. Nvidia shares fell nearly 5% on the day of the reporting, closing at $196.51 and shedding roughly $250 billion of market value, which briefly cost the company its position as the world's most valuable listed firm to Apple. Bloomberg separately reported that Nvidia had already disclosed more than $540 billion of such financing arrangements during 2026 prior to the reported OpenAI negotiations, and both the International Monetary Fund and the Bank for International Settlements identified AI-related circular financing as a systemic downside risk. Investment strategist Billy Leung of Global X Management characterised additional Nvidia guarantees for OpenAI's data-centre debt as evidence of "funding strain in the AI buildout" as much as of underlying customer demand.

The third quarter 2026 financial report of Nvidia disclosed $164.5 billion in contingent liabilities relating to third parties that would crystallise if partners defaulted on their lease and other commitments. Nvidia has underwritten a 20-year lease to an OpenAI data center in Ohio of up to $105 billion. Lease and other capacity guarantees exceed $50 billion; other guarantees related to AI cloud and data center partners capped at $108.5 billion. Terms such as "Nvidia Bank" and "Bank of AI" are gaining currency within the financial community, while the architect of the financing is no longer in the company.

Credit stress was reported to have spread to other companies tied to the AI build-out: S&P Global downgraded Oracle's credit rating to BBB−, its lowest investment-grade tier, with Oracle's own five-year CDS widening to 215 basis points, and Alphabet was reported to have posted negative free cash flow for the first time since its initial public offering as AI-related spending increased. A FactSet analysis cited in the same reporting found that combined capital expenditure by five major hyperscalers – Alphabet, Amazon, Meta, Microsoft and Oracle – was on track to exceed $690 billion in fiscal 2026, over 80% higher year-on-year, with free cash flow at most of the five approaching zero or turning negative as AI-related costs were front-loaded. Société Générale's head of US equity strategy, Manish Kabra, was quoted summarising the shift in investor attention as being toward credit rather than earnings measures for hyperscale computing firms. At the time of reporting, Nvidia shares were trading around 17% below their 52-week high, and the company had not issued a public statement on the reported OpenAI arrangement, with deal terms unconfirmed pending its next quarterly results.

=== Risks and criticism ===
Analysts and investors identified several risks specific to using AI computing hardware as loan collateral. Unlike more traditional forms of vendor-financed collateral such as real estate or aircraft, GPUs depreciate quickly as new generations of chips are released, and may be further accelerated by commoditisation of compute by Chinese competitors. Following a 54-day training run for Llama 3 in 2024, Meta estimated the failure rate could be around 9% a year. Another factor of obsolescence is energy efficiency: new chips are said to be "orders of magnitude more energy efficient than the A100". Jensen Huang responded that sustained customer use of older-generation Nvidia chips demonstrated that the hardware retained value well after release. Underwriters may also face the risk that AI infrastructure build-out could stall, or that projects could be delayed or cancelled if demand for AI products falls short of expectations.

Nvidia, who is driving the project and whose revenue depends on customers being able to afford its chips, obviously stands to benefit from the financing arrangement, as will smaller AI labs, cloud companies and enterprises that face comparatively high borrowing costs. The intended purchasers of the resulting debt are institutional investors such as pension funds, insurers and sovereign-wealth funds. Bond issuance tied to AI infrastructure – covering big technology companies, data-centre projects and chip-financing vehicles – reached $344 billion by early August 2026, an increase of more than $200 billion over 2025, according to Bank of America Global Research. They projected a further $100 billion of issuance from large technology companies before the end of 2026. Weaker borrowers already faced elevated yields: CoreWeave raised a $2.6 billion loan facility, backed by contracts with Anthropic and Jane Street, at more than nine percentage points over benchmark rates, while a $3.5 billion junk-bond sale by Galaxy Digital to fund a Texas data centre leased to CoreWeave priced at nearly 10%. A price war from China would significantly lower collateral values in the event of default. Larry Fink saw a parallel to the creation of the mortgage backed security.

Michael Burry, known for shorting mortgage-backed securities before the 2008 financial crisis, considers AI a bubble and has stated the structuring of such credit late in the bull phase reflected vulnerability in the AI market. Bloomberg's analysis drew an explicit parallel to vendor financing during the late-1990s telecommunications boom, when equipment makers extended loans and other support that allowed carriers to sustain heavy investment in fibre-optic networks; when demand forecasts were not met, several heavily leveraged carriers cut spending or filed for bankruptcy, and regulators later examined "capacity swap" transactions at firms including Qwest and Global Crossing, some of which led to restated revenue. Venture capitalist Paul Kedrosky, who covered the telecom sector during that period, said AI capital spending was approaching levels last seen at the peak of the fibre-optic buildout, with a risk that facilities built around current-generation chips could become obsolete before recouping their cost.

== Delays, cancellations and local opposition ==
By late 2026 a growing number of AI data-centre projects in the United States were running into physical, regulatory and political obstacles that threatened the future revenue on which the financing structures described above depend. Utility Dive described the boom as having entered a "contradictory" phase, in which construction activity and forecasts of grid-capacity additions remained robust while individual projects stalled, including some with a named hyperscaler attached. In May 2026 Goldman Sachs estimated that only 50–60% of planned data-centre capacity would come online as scheduled over the following two years because of delays and cancellations, and Wood Mackenzie reported that the 36 GW added to the US development pipeline in the first quarter of 2026 was 19% lower than in the last quarter of 2025.

=== Equipment and labour shortages ===
Developers faced multi-year waits for electrical equipment. According to the marketplace Fluxco, a typical customer waited two to three years for power transformers and generator step-up units, with little improvement expected before 2027; GE Vernova, the largest US gas-turbine maker, was quoting delivery dates in the early 2030s for a backlog exceeding 100 GW. The Electric Power Research Institute described skilled-labour shortages as a binding constraint rivalling land, permitting and energy supply, with data centres competing for electricians and pipefitters with semiconductor plants, battery factories and power-generation projects. Some developers responded with "bring your own capacity" arrangements, in which a data centre is co-located with new generation: OpenAI agreed in September 2026 to take 8 GW from a planned 10 GW generation project in Ohio pursued by SoftBank Group and the US Department of Energy, and Amazon proposed a 7.7 GW gas-fired plant in West Texas.

=== Public opposition and political backlash ===
Local opposition became a significant cause of cancellations. A Heatmap News poll in May 2026 found 71% of Americans would oppose a data centre being built nearby, nearly 30 percentage points higher than in the previous September, and by Heatmap's count local opposition killed at least 20 proposed projects in the first quarter of 2026, the most in any quarter on record. Concerns centred on water use, power and gas costs and reliability, and quality of life in host communities; in the PJM Interconnection region the independent market monitor attributed 38% of charges at the most recent capacity auction to data centres. Governors in Pennsylvania, Virginia and New Jersey pressed regulators to require data centres to bring more generation and transmission online, and backlash spread to states previously regarded as welcoming: Utah's governor called on developers to do more to protect air, water and ratepayers, after which a county imposed a six-month moratorium and the investor behind a 9 GW project in northern Utah scaled it back. In Texas, Governor Greg Abbott directed regulators in June to ensure data centres fully fund the electrical infrastructure serving them and weeks later effectively halted new data-centre grid interconnections pending an audit of the queue, a pause that BloombergNEF said threatened up to 20% of the total US development pipeline. A diesel-fuel spill from a data centre in Secaucus, New Jersey, in September 2026 added to public anger.

AI datacentres were also featured in the 2026 United States elections in more than 40 jurisdictions in 10 states. In Maine, eight municipalities passed temporary datacentre moratoria; 14 districts in Ohio either refused or restricted projects. Voters rejected all of the facilties that were on the ballot, except one in North Dakota. Notably, a $2bn datacentre project in Sunbury, Ohio, for Amazon was rejected; a 1,000-acre datacentre was also voted down in Emporia, Kansas. In Texas, despite having forced to modify his stance on datacentres, Greg Abbott lost to his Democrat challenger, Gina Hinojosa, who had promised to impose moratorium on their construction.

=== Oracle and Project Jupiter ===
Oracle, anticipating potential delays in securing power for Project Jupiter in Doña Ana County, New Mexico, issued a "force majeure" notice on 24 September 2026 to Stack Infrastructure, a division of Blue Owl Capital. The company was reportedly seeking to extend rent payments in case the campus failed to open in 2028 as planned. The campus, reported to have secured $18 billion in bank loans, forms part of Oracle's agreement with OpenAI under the Stargate initiative, and had faced delays to a planned gas pipeline and legal challenges over environmental permits. Blue Owl, which had about $3 billion of equity at stake, had contractual entitlement to a development-stage return of 9% that would rise to about 11% on completion. The source said under the contract, securing power was Oracle's responsibility. Blue Owl said the "force majeure" notice did not change its financial commitments as the lease was irrevocable under any circumstance; Oracle asserted the project remained on schedule. The episode came as Oracle's credit rating had been cut to BBB− as already referred to above.

== Allegations of channel stuffing and idle chips ==
As data-centre construction lagged chip deliveries, critics alleged in October 2026 that Nvidia was engaging in "channel stuffing" – pushing more hardware onto customers than they could use. The technology commentator Ed Zitron said that at least $200 billion worth of Nvidia chips were sitting in warehouses, while partners had to take delivery of current systems or lose access to the next-generation Vera Rubin line. On The Tech Report, he argued that as much as half of Nvidia's revenue could be represented by equipment that was not yet installed; he estimated that Microsoft's AI-specific capacity was about 2 GW and, assuming half of its capital expenditure went on GPUs, that it held about $82.5 billion of uninstalled chips, and suggested that accounting depreciation may not begin until equipment is placed in service while two GPU generations face obsolescence risk.

Business Insider cited internal Amazon emails saying that the company expected to receive about $5 billion of Nvidia GB300 racks under a new "Early Rack Receipt" programme. A further $3 billion a month was projected, although some AWS sites lacked power, leaving equipment in intermediate warehouses such that the company commits to the hardware long before revenues can be generated from it. A note by Goldman Sachs on 6 November that estimated that there would likely be many more semiconductors than data-centre facililties to fill them by 2028. Similarly, Elon Musk said the industry would before long be making more chips than be incorporated in data centres.

Zitron's accusations of channel-stuffing appear to be supported by Nvidia's worsening accounting metrics: lengthening collection times and declining free cash. Receivables as at July 2026 stood at $63.1 billion, representing an increase of days sales outstanding from 45 in January to 60 in July, while free cash flow fell to $21.3 billion from $48.6 billion over the same period. Nvidia's chief financial officer said that more generous payment terms had been accorded on multi-quarter deals to certain blue-chip customers. One analyst from TIKR argued that nothing in Nvidia's sales or its largest customers' statements supported the $200 billion figure for idle chips. However, CEO of CItadel, Ken Griffin cautioned that if GPU were to exceeded demand, marginal pricing could go into freefall.

Selected guarantees and backstops by suppliers and tenants
Date	Guarantor	Beneficiary / project	Terms	Source
2025	Nvidia	CoreWeave	Initial $6.3 billion order guaranteeing purchase of unsold cloud capacity	
June 2026	Broadcom	Anthropic chip-lease package ($35 billion, arranged by Apollo, Blackstone and banks)	Backstop; maximum disclosed exposure $29 billion, falling as lease payments are received	
August 2026	Nvidia	Proposed asset-backed financing platforms	"Residual-value support" of up to 25% of project cost	
September 2026	Oracle	Project Jupiter (Blue Owl)	Oracle pays debt costs; cannot terminate lease; force majeure notice delays higher rent	

== See also ==
- AI bubble
- Jensen Huang scandal – Alleged spy plot targeting Nvidia CEO
- Tied aid – International transfer of resources with geographic limits on procurement and spending
