= AI bubble =

Concept asserting ongoing stock market bubble

A graph showing circular financing between AI companies. The two leading AI labs, OpenAI and Anthropic, are being funded by their suppliers: the industry's key hardware manufacturer, Nvidia, and hyperscale AI data center operators such as Amazon, Google, and Microsoft. Neoclouds (specialized AI computing providers) such as CoreWeave and Nebius are also receiving investments from Nvidia.

The AI bubble is an alleged stock market bubble growing since 2025 amid the AI boom, a period of rapid increase in investment in artificial intelligence (AI) that The Wall Street Journal reported as "the biggest economic bet in U.S. history". Early AI investment was funded primarily with operating cash flow, but by 2026 the bond market came to dominate the AI build-out financing, as well as $3 trillion in off-balance-sheet commitments.

Speculation about a bubble also stems from concerns that leading AI tech firms are involved in a circular flow of investments that are artificially inflating the value of their stocks and the broader market. The Wall Street Journal reported that the circularity, reminiscent of the dotcom build-out of the 1990s, "can be virtuous on the upside, and vicious on the downside." Some, like hedge fund manager Ray Dalio, see other similarities with the dot-com bubble.

== History ==
The number of Google searches for the term "AI" has accelerated.

In January 2025, the Chinese-made chatbot DeepSeek demonstrated performance on par with AI models developed at far greater expense. The stock prices of many AI companies dropped—for example, Nvidia's dropped 17%, or approximately US$600 billion in market value in a single day, though it recovered 8.8% the following day. In late 2025, spending from US mega caps was expected to reach $1.1 trillion between 2026 and 2029, while total AI spending was expected to surpass $1.6 trillion.

Due to the growing demand for semiconductors to sustain AI technologies, Nvidia in July 2025 became the first company in the world to reach a market value of $4 trillion. The figure had quadrupled since 2023, when it surpassed $1 trillion. The company's value made up roughly 7.3% of the S&P 500, which hit an all-time high. In October 2025, the company's value grew beyond $5 trillion, rising higher than the GDP of every country except for the United States and China, according to data from the World Bank. Over the year 2025, AI-related enterprises accounted for roughly 80% of gains in the American stock market. Some skeptics warned that the rapid rise of AI tech firms may be the result of excessive financial engineering.

Microsoft disclosed that it had spent almost $35 billion on AI infrastructure in the three months leading up to the end of September. In October, it became the second-most-valuable company in the world, largely due to its 27% stake in OpenAI. While seeing increases in revenue by 18% and in net income by 12%, share values dropped by 4% in after-hours trading amid investors' concerns about the possible costs of sustaining the AI boom.

In late 2025, 30% of the US S&P 500 and 20% of the MSCI World index was solely held up by the five largest companies (Nvidia, Microsoft, Apple, Alphabet, and Amazon), which was the greatest concentration in half a century, and share valuations were reportedly the most stretched since the dot-com bubble. Experts warned that AI companies were extremely overvalued, with the S&P 500 trading at 23 times forward earnings, and the FTSE Index trading at 14 times, showing how expensive the US market had become. The Shiller price-to-earnings ratio for the US market also exceeded 40 for the first time since the dot-com crash.

In late June and across July 2026, South Korea's stock market had a historic crash, with the KOSPI index dropping by 44% in 40 days, erasing $2.18 trillion in market value due to a massive sell-off in Samsung Electronics and SK Hynix stocks (which together held more than half of the index value), triggered by Big Tech's lack of short-term return on investment in AI infrastructure, and fears of a subsequent slowdown in demand for High Bandwidth Memory chips. In October, the Chinese index STAR50 had dropped 40% since July due to limitations on Chinese exports and limited demand, described by several organizations as the bursting of China's AI bubble.

By October 2026, the demand for AI computing power was exceeding supply, leading to increasing prices for capacity and what one start-up executive described as a "gold rush" mentality.

On 17 November 2026, US stocks declined amid concerns about AI spending. The Dow Jones Industrial Average fell 1.64%, the S&P 500 lost 1.03%, and the Nasdaq Composite declined 0.74%. Losses extended beyond technology stocks, with software, airline and banking shares also falling.

== Speculation ==
In early 2025, Bridgewater Associates co-chief investment officer Ray Dalio said that the current levels of investment in AI are "very similar" to the dot-com bubble. Sam Altman, CEO of OpenAI, which created ChatGPT, said in August 2025 that he believed that an AI bubble exists. In September 2025, the Australian Financial Review said that "If we really are in another share-market bubble, it's surely the most anticipated example in history."

The large language model usage on OpenRouter increased during the months.

In October 2025, Jamie Dimon, chief executive of JPMorgan Chase, the largest bank in the US, said he thinks "AI is real" but said he believes some money invested now will be wasted. He also said there is a higher chance of a meaningful drop in stocks over the following two years than the market was reflecting. Dimon warned that an AI-driven stock crash could result in substantial losses, although he acknowledged that AI would pay off "just like cars in total paid off, and TVs in total paid off, but most people involved in them didn't do well." However, he further stated on AI that "the level of uncertainty should be higher in most people's minds."

=== Lack of profitability ===
Critics argue that the values of technology company stocks have been inflated based on AI hype regardless of market fundamentals or the financial reality behind monetizing AI products. A National Bureau of Economic Research study published in February 2026 found that despite 90% of firms reporting no impact of AI on workplace and productivity, executives projected AI to increase productivity by 1.4% and increase output by 0.8%, leading to comparison with productivity paradox.

OpenAI committed to spending US$1.4 trillion over 8 years in building new data centers, partnering with Nvidia to deliver 10 gigawatts of data center computation, with just US$13 billion in revenue. This long-term spending is funded by debt. An estimate from Morgan Stanley put global spending on datacenters between 2025 and 2028 at US$3 trillion, half of which is covered by private credit. In November 2025, OpenAI said it expected to report annual losses through 2028, including US$74 billion in operating losses in 2028 alone. The Wall Street Journal obtained financial documents where OpenAI projects significant profits in 2030 despite preceding years of deep losses. Deutsche Bank analyst Jim Reid estimated OpenAI's losses amounting to US$140 billion between 2024 and 2029.

Former Fidelity manager George Noble said that OpenAI is "burning US$15 million per day on Sora alone." He also highlighted that AI companies will face diminishing returns in model improvements paired with rising costs, saying that "It's going to cost 5x the energy and money to make these models 2x better." OpenAI has been projected to run out of money by mid-2027.

=== AI build-out financing ===
Concerns were raised, notably by critic Ed Zitron, that leading AI tech firms were using circular financing and investment to artificially boost their valuations. In September, Nvidia announced a $100 billion investment into OpenAI, expanding the pre-existing stake that it held in the company. This agreement was made on the expectation that OpenAI would power additional data centers using the GPUs that it had been buying from Nvidia, establishing a circular flow of money.

In October 2025, OpenAI purchased billions of dollars worth of graphics cards and CPUs from AMD, a rival of Nvidia, to supply its development of AI in an agreement that made it one of the largest shareholders in the company. Microsoft also held a large stake in OpenAI, and Oracle Corporation, a computing company, also entered into a $300 billion deal with the company.

The Wall Street Journal reported in September 2026 that AI "is on track to become the biggest economic bet in U.S. history, dwarfing the investments made to fund other huge U.S. infrastructure projects." AI investment was estimated to comprise 3.6% of gross domestic product, compared to 2.2% for the railroad projects of the 1800s, 1.1% for the interstate highway system of the 1950s, and 1.1% for the Internet build-out of 1996 through 2003.

Hyperscalers had historically been net savers, flush with cash and little debt, but in 2026 they began aggressively selling long-dated bonds to finance AI, including a rare 100-year term bond from Alphabet. The bonds were typically sold in non-USD currencies and in large denominations to attract pension fund and insurance company investors, using off-balance-sheet special-purpose vehicles.

The build-out is also enabled by private credit, a nearly $2 trillion part of the shadow banking system that operates outside the regulatory structure of the conventional banking system. The Financial Stability Board, which monitors and advises the G20 financial system, warned in May 2026 that a “sharp correction in asset valuations, which have increased rapidly, could lead to sizeable credit losses to private credit investors,” as well as a risk of an investor "run" on private credit funds should their loans go bad. Traditional banks have increasing risk exposure to private credit by directly lending to them or by other indirect means. By 2026, growing concerns about the stability of the industry drew comparisons to the lead-up to the 2008 financial crisis.

Oracle Corporation executive chairman Larry Ellison co-founded the joint venture Stargate Project with the CEOs of OpenAI and Softbank in January 2025. The project announced plans to spend $500 billion on AI build-out in several states, with Oracle issuing debt of at least $100 billion. The project has encountered intensifying economic and environmental resistance from local communities. In September 2026 Oracle sent a force majeure notice to the developer of its Project Jupiter data center in New Mexico, in an effort to delay payments on the project. The developer is a unit of private credit lender Blue Owl Capital. In March 2026, OpenAI abandoned expansion of the Stargate flagship data center in Abilene, Texas, with an anonymous source saying the company instead hopes to use next-generation Nvidia chips elsewhere. Banks and bond raters signaled concerns about Oracle's financial stability by marking down the value of its loans and downgrading its bonds in 2026. The spread on Oracle's five-year credit default swap, indicating the perceived risk of debt default, increased through 2026, reaching a record close of 261 basis points on October 8, above that of other AI firms.

The Wall Street Journal reported in late October 2026 that AI investors and lenders were aggressively racing to hedge their positions as concerns deepened of a potential structural unraveling.

=== Central bank views ===
In October 2025, the Bank of England warned of the growing risks of a global market correction due to a possible overvaluation of leading AI tech firms in the stock market, such as OpenAI, which more than tripled its value from $157 billion in October 2024 to $500 billion the following year. The bank also warned that those valuations could fall further if the cost of the infrastructure needed to run AI systems proved too high. They added that investors were not properly cautioned about the risks of a stock market crash were AI to fall short of market expectations.

The International Monetary Fund agreed with and reinforced the bank's claims. Kristalina Georgieva, a Bulgarian economist and the 12th managing director of the IMF, also drew comparisons to the dot-com bubble of 2001, highlighting that a market correction could stunt global growth and weaken the economies of developing countries.

The U.S. Federal Reserve had largely been indifferent about possible AI risks, but by August 2026 some officials began expressing concerns about the pace of spending, uncertain returns and the increasing use of debt and complex financial structures by the sector. Kansas City Fed President Jeff Schmid said it was important to assess whether the AI ecosystem was becoming too big to fail. By its October 2026 meeting nearly all Fed members were expressing concerns about the growth in AI-related debt and "complex and opaque financing structures."

=== Debt ===
CoreWeave bond yields

Debt funding has also raised the risk of the bubble. In 2025, analysts at Morgan Stanley estimated that debt used to fund data centers could exceed $1 trillion by 2028. Many data center debt bonds are either BBB-rated or junk-rated bonds.

=== Dot-com bubble comparisons ===
The AI bubble has drawn comparisons to the dot-com bubble of the 2000s. Billionaire investor Ray Dalio, who predicted the 2008 financial crisis, warned that the AI bubble echoes the dot-com in the overvaluation of tech stocks amid low interest rates. In October 2025, Julien Garran, a researcher and partner at MacroStrategy Partnership, argued that the AI boom represented an unusually large and dangerous bubble, estimating it to be 17 times larger than the dot-com bubble and four times larger than the 2008 real-estate bubble.

"Circular financing" reminiscent of vendor financing of the dotcom era is a prominent feature of the AI build-out in the mid-2020s, as chipmakers and hyperscalers have extended capital, guarantees and purchase commitments to the companies that buy their hardware and services. The practice is most closely associated with Nvidia, whose graphics processing units (GPUs) power most hyperscaler training and inference, and with "frontier labs." Because hyperscalers and frontier labs are simultaneously one another's investors, suppliers and customers, commentators have described the resulting arrangements as circular. The Wall Street Journal reported the circularity "can be virtuous on the upside, and vicious on the downside."

The boom has benefited many companies and national economies, with Capital Economics estimating AI contributing to up to 80% of export growth. A HSBC economist said in November 2026, "There is very little that can be done to prevent a global recession should the AI boom collapse". A Moody's Analytics economist said that because investors around the world participate in financing the boom, if AI stocks greatly dropped in value, "The result could be a severe economic shock with global recessionary consequences".

=== Technical limitations ===
Large language models have technical limitations:

- Their reliability is limited by their tendency to create false information
- They can't handle information not present in their training data
- Their progress is limited by existing human-created data

== Opposing views ==
Several major financial institutions have pushed back against claims of an AI bubble, arguing that current valuations reflect real earnings growth rather than speculation. Peter Oppenheimer, Goldman Sachs's chief equity strategist, argued that stock price gains among large-cap AI companies are backed by actual profit growth. The firm noted that forward price-to-earnings (P/E) ratios for these companies remain well below the levels seen during the dot-com era. Morgan Stanley analysts described bubble fears as "misplaced" or "premature", pointing to data showing that the median cash flow and capital reserves of the top 500 US firms were about three times higher than during past bubble periods. They also noted that today's market leaders, unlike dot-com-era companies, generate substantial revenue.

JPMorgan concluded that AI does not meet the classic criteria for a financial bubble. A December 2025 analysis applied a five-factor diagnostic framework to the AI rally and found that investment in the sector is linked to actual enterprise revenue rather than speculation alone. Federal Reserve Chair Jerome Powell also drew a distinction from the dot-com era, arguing that AI companies generate real revenue and that spending on AI data centres is contributing to broader economic growth. Los Angeles Times culture critic Mary McNamara wrote in late March 2026 that the demise of ChatGPT's Sora text-to-video model would be neither "the first domino [n]or the bursting of the AI bubble", arguing that instead reflected public antipathy toward the AI market and vulnerabilities of companies producing and marketing their own AI projects.

== See also ==
- AI washing – Deceptive marketing tactic
- Cryptocurrency bubble – Speculative bubble involving cryptocurrency prices
- Digital Revolution – Industrial shift to information technology
- Fourth Industrial Revolution – Term for 2010s–present technological era
- History of artificial intelligence
- AI winter
- Gartner hype cycle
- Productivity paradox – Economic paradox
- Social media stock bubble – Speculative bubble involving social media
- Speculation – Engaging in risky financial transactions
- Workplace impact of artificial intelligence
- 2025–present global memory supply shortage – Semiconductor memory supply crisis
