= Silicon Data =

- Type: Private
- Industry: Market intelligence
- Founded: 2024; 2 years ago
- Founder: Carmen Li
- Headquarters: New York, United States
- Key people: Carmen Li (CEO)
- Products: GPU rental-price indices and performance benchmarks
- Website: www.silicondata.com

Silicon Data is a New York–based market intelligence company that provides data and analytics on the pricing and performance of computing power used for artificial intelligence (AI). It produces rental-price indices for graphics processing units (GPUs) and the SiliconMark performance benchmark. The company was founded in 2024 by Carmen Li, formerly an executive at Bloomberg.

In May 2025, the company introduced the first worldwide index of hourly rental prices for Nvidia H100 GPUs. Silicon Data later collaborated with William & Mary and Jefferson Lab on testing rented GPUs with its SiliconMark benchmark. In May 2026, CME Group and Silicon Data announced plans to develop futures contracts based on the company’s rental-price indices, subject to regulatory review.

== History ==
The rapid adoption of generative artificial intelligence in 2023, combined with manufacturing constraints, contributed to shortages of the graphics processing units (GPUs) used to train and run AI models, limiting capacity at major cloud providers and leading startups to seek alternative cloud providers.

Carmen Li founded Silicon Data in 2024 after leaving Bloomberg, where she had worked as global head of strategic alliances for enterprise data. The idea for the company grew out of Li’s encounters with smaller AI businesses that sold products at fixed prices while paying fluctuating rates to rent GPUs. Those changing rental costs left the companies’ profit margins exposed, prompting Li to establish Silicon Data.

Silicon Data raised $4.7 million in March 2025 through a seed funding round co-led by DRW and Jump Trading Group. In August 2026, the company announced the $30.5 million initial closing of a Series A funding round. Valor Atreides AI Fund led the round, and CME Group was among the participants.

== Products and research ==
=== GPU pricing indices ===
Silicon Data produces a series of indices that track GPU rental prices over time across different chip models and provider categories. On May 28, 2025, it launched the SDH100RT, the first worldwide rental-price index for a GPU. The index measures the average spot price for renting one Nvidia H100 GPU for an hour. At its launch, it processed 3.5 million data points daily from more than 30 sources. Its methodology adjusts observations from different rental markets and weights factors including provider participation, location and data source. Historical observations are incorporated, and the relative weights are recalibrated as market conditions change.

By 2026, Silicon Data had expanded its indices to cover H100 and B200 rentals in specialized neocloud and hyperscaler environments. Its data indicated that H100 rental prices from hyperscalers were nearly three times those of neocloud providers. The indices were distributed through the Bloomberg and LSEG financial-data platforms. In December 2025, The Wall Street Journal cited Silicon Data’s estimate that an H100 system in its third year of use had an average resale value equal to approximately 45 percent of the price of a new system.

=== Performance benchmarking ===
SiliconMark is Silicon Data’s benchmark for comparing GPUs rented through cloud providers. It measures computing performance and memory bandwidth and compares the result of an individual rental with a larger collection of tests.

According to results published by Silicon Data and reported by IEEE Spectrum, a project conducted with William & Mary and Jefferson Lab ran the benchmark 6,800 times on 3,500 randomly selected GPUs from 11 cloud providers, covering 11 Nvidia models. The reported results showed computing-performance differences of up to 34.5 percent among H100 PCIe GPUs and memory-bandwidth differences of up to 38 percent among H200 SXM GPUs. Silicon Data’s analysis attributed most of the variation to differences among individual chips, while also identifying cooling, provider configuration and previous use as contributing factors.

== Compute futures ==
CME Group and Silicon Data announced in May 2026 that they intended to develop futures contracts tied to Silicon Data’s GPU rental-price indices. The contracts were designed to allow buyers and sellers of computing capacity to hedge changes in rental rates. On August 11, CME announced a planned October 5 launch, pending regulatory review. The proposed H100 and B200 contracts would each represent one month of rental costs for the corresponding Nvidia GPU and would be listed under the rules of NYMEX.

The proposed market faced difficulties because computing capacity is not completely fungible. Rentals using the same GPU model can differ in processor configuration, memory, networking, utilization and location, while a lack of common standards can make workloads difficult to move between providers. Silicon Data said it had identified more than 50 H100 configurations and normalized price observations to a base configuration before calculating its index.

Regulators were expected to review the contract specifications, settlement procedures and index methodology before the market could open. Commentators also identified participation by both buyers and providers, sufficient liquidity, rapid GPU obsolescence and the administrative complexity of futures trading as potential obstacles.

== See also ==
- AI infrastructure
- General-purpose computing on graphics processing units
- Utility computing
