= Corning, New York (disambiguation) =

Corning, New York is the name of two places in Steuben County, New York, although it most frequently means the City of Corning.

- Corning (city), New York
- Corning (town), New York, adjacent to the city

== See also ==
- Corning (disambiguation), includes other places named "Corning"
