= List of largest losses of wealth =

The following is a list of all people who have lost over $50 billion of net personal wealth in a one-year period. Many of these losses were due to a change in value tied to stock ownership, and so were unrealized losses.

List of the largest declines in personal wealth
Loss	Losee	Year	Ref.
$750 billion	(United States) Elon Musk	2026	
$80 billion	(United States) Jeff Bezos	2022	
$78 billion	(United States) Mark Zuckerberg	2022	
$60 billion	(India) Gautam Adani	2023	
$58.6 billion	(Japan) Masayoshi Son	2000	

== See also ==
- List of centibillionaires
- List of largest corporate profits and losses
- List of trading losses
- Timeline of the world's richest person
