= Something Big Is Happening =

Essay by AI entrepreneur Matt Shumer

"Something Big Is Happening" is an essay by Matt Shumer, an AI entrepreneur, about the impact of artificial intelligence, published in February 2026, that has since been reportedly viewed more than 80 million times and widely discussed. Shumer noted that the technology has crossed an important threshold, where AI has become capable of creating self-improving systems. Referring to one the most recent AI models, he wrote: "It was making intelligent decisions. It had something that felt, for the first time, like judgment. Like taste." Speaking to CNBC's Power Lunch, Shumer said that his "core message" is "people in the workforce should start to use and experiment with AI tools so they can understand what’s coming".

Even as the essay was widely shared and discussed, the essay also elicited criticism. Paulo Carvao, in an essay published by the Forbes Magazine stated that some of his advice is sound, but added: "It reads at times like a sales pitch. He urges readers to subscribe to the most advanced AI tools. He implies that those with access to premium models will outpace those without. He frames paid AI subscriptions as a form of insurance against obsolescence." Writing in The Guardian, Dan Milmo and Aisha Down mentioned Shumer as having a history of AI hype and stated, "He previously excited the internet by announcing the release of the world's "top open-source model", which it was not". Many workers in the technology sector criticized the article in blog posts shared on Hacker News; Edward Zitron commented that "while coding LLMs can test products, or scan/fix some bugs, this suggests they A) do this autonomously without human input, B) they do this correctly every time (or ever!)." In an article alluding to Shumer's original post, Ari Colaprete wrote "the LLM is fundamentally a writing machine, it does everything via text, and if you make it produce writing that exists purely to serve some sort of mechanical function, and you train it to succeed in that task, then it will tend to do so, even with vast intricacy."
