= Same as cash =

Term used in retail to attract buyers

In retailing, same as cash is a term used by retailers to offer things which you can buy without paying any interest, usually within 30, 60, or 90 days, and occasionally six months. It is a deferred payment on purchases. If the payment becomes overdue interest would be charged from day one at the pre specified interest rate.

This kind of finance is usually offered by furniture, consumer electronics and car retailers.

Others similar terms used are interest free purchasing.

== See also ==
- Payday loan
- Hire purchase
- Vendor finance
