= Masayoshi Son =

Japanese entrepreneur (born 1957)

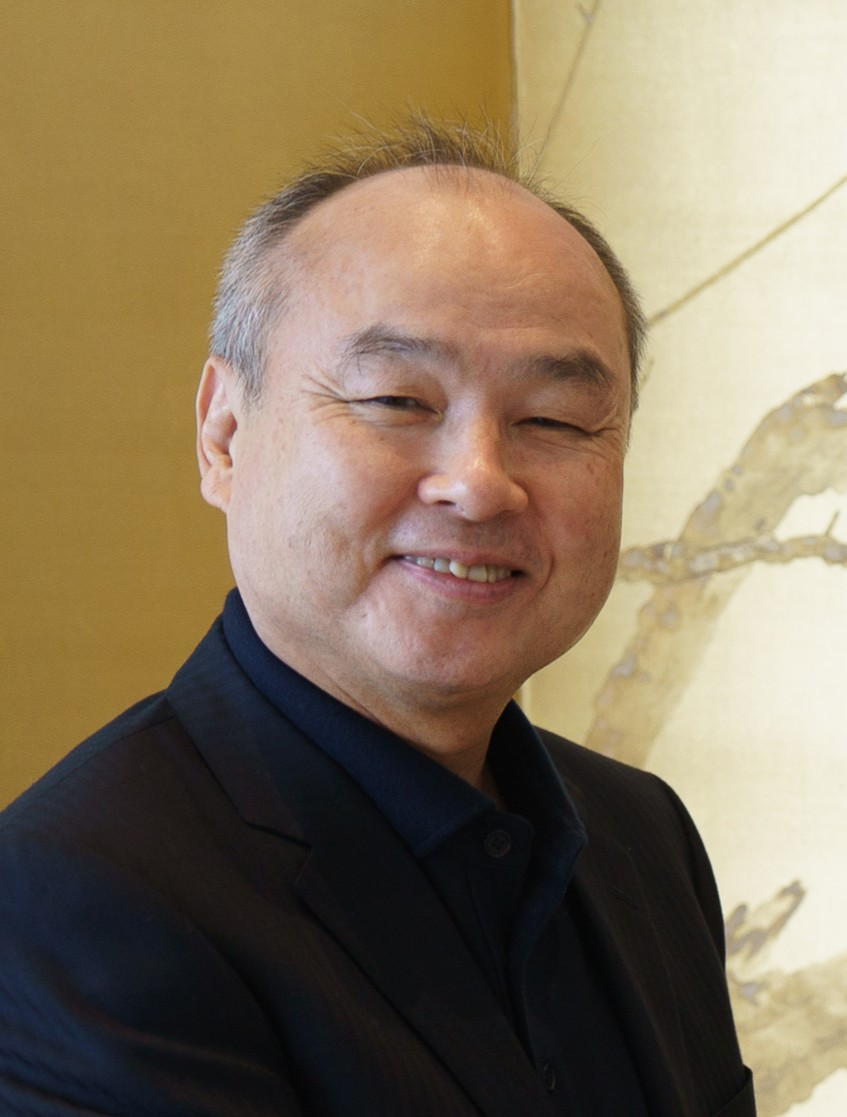
- Son in 2025
- Born: Masayoshi Yasumoto; 11 August 1957 (age 69); Tosu, Saga, Japan
- Other name: Son Jeong-ui
- Education: University of California, Berkeley (BA)
- Occupations: Entrepreneur, investor, philanthropist
- Known for: Founder of Softbank Group
- Title: Chairman and CEO of SoftBank Group; Chairman of Arm Holdings; Chairman of Stargate LLC
- Spouse: Masami Ohno (m. 1979)
- Children: 2

Japanese name
- Kanji: 孫 正義
- Romanization: Son Masayoshi

Birth name
- Kanji: 安本 正義
- Romanization: Yasumoto Masayoshi

Korean name
- Hangul: 손정의
- RR: Son Jeongui
- MR: Son Chŏngŭi

Masayoshi Son (Japanese: 孫 正義; born Masayoshi Yasumoto, August 11, 1957) is a Japanese entrepreneur, investor, and philanthropist. A Zainichi Korean, he is the founder, chairman and chief executive of SoftBank Group (SBG), a technology-focused investment holding company, as well as chairman of UK-based Arm Holdings and US-based Stargate LLC.

As an entrepreneur, he achieved notability in software distribution, computing-related book and magazine publishing, and telecommunications in Japan, starting in the 1980s and booming throughout the 1990s and 2000s. His early $20 million investment in Alibaba Group in 2000 grew substantially over the years, reaching a valuation of around $75 billion by 2014 following Alibaba's IPO, and contributing significantly to SoftBank's financial success. SoftBank's 27 percent stake in Alibaba was worth $132 billion in 2018, including additional purchases of the stock since 2000. The morphing of his own telecom company SoftBank Corp. into an investment management firm called SoftBank Group Corp. made him noted worldwide as a stock investor. He is known for his bold investment strategies, sometimes resulting in major losses, particularly with the first and second SoftBank Vision Funds.

In 2013, Son was placed 45th on the Forbes magazine's list of the World's Most Powerful People. In 2017 he was named Entrepreneur of the Year at The Asian Awards. As of May 2025, Son ranks 65th on the Forbes's list of The World's Billionaires and is No. 177 on the Bloomberg Billionaires Index. He had for many years the distinction of being the person who had lost the most money in history (more than $59 billion during the dot-com crash of 2000 alone, when his SoftBank shares plummeted), a feat surpassed by Elon Musk in the following decades.

== Early life and education ==
Masayoshi Son was born Masayoshi Yasumoto on August 11, 1957, in Tosu, Saga Prefecture to Zainichi Korean parents. Son's grandfather, Son Jong-kyung, a native of Daegu, moved to Japan during the Japanese colonial period where he worked as a miner. Son's father, Son Sam-heon, raised pigs and chickens, and illegally built the family home on land that was owned by the Japanese National Railways, which caused them trouble with the authorities. His father started an illegal sake business that eventually became successful enough for his family to become the first people in town to own a car. His family eventually moved out of the neighborhood so that Son could attend a better school. Throughout his childhood, Son's family refrained from using their Korean names. He did however experience bullying and discrimination for his Korean origin and at one point contemplated suicide.

Son idolized businessman Den Fujita, the founder of McDonald's Japan, and attempted to contact him multiple times to no avail. This culminated in Son purchasing a plane ticket to Tokyo and making an unsolicited appearance at the headquarters of McDonald's Japan, where he was able to speak to Fujita for 15 minutes. Fujita advised Son to begin studying English as well as computer science, and to move to the United States for education. Following this advice, Son dropped out of high school in Japan and, at the age of 16, moved to Oakland, California. He studied English at Holy Names College and graduated from high school in three weeks after attending Serramonte High School. He subsequently enrolled at the University of California, Berkeley, where he studied economics, graduating in 1980.

He began his first business endeavours while still a student. With the help of some professors including Forrest Mozer, Son created an electronic translator that he sold to Sharp Corporation for $1.7 million. He made another $1.5 million by importing used video game machines from Japan, on credit and installing them in dormitories and restaurants. He also started a video game company called Unison World in Oakland; he sold the company to an associate for $2 million, and the company was later acquired by Kyocera.

Following his return to Japan, he decided to adopt his Korean surname Son for professional purposes instead of his family's Japanese surname Yasumoto. He encountered pushback from some of his relatives who feared to be exposed as Korean. For this action and other similar ones, Son is considered to be a role model for ethnic Korean children in Japan.

== Career ==
=== SoftBank ===
Son is the founder, CEO and largest shareholder of SoftBank; as of December 2022, he had a 34.2 per cent stake in the company. He founded the company in 1981 as a software distributor and a publisher of computer-related literature.

=== SoftBank Corp. ===
Son was the CEO of SoftBank Corp., the mobile business of SoftBank Group, until 2021.

=== Yahoo! and Alibaba ===
Son was an early investor in internet firms, buying a share of Yahoo! in 1995 and investing a $20 million stake into Alibaba in 1999; he was briefly the richest person in the world before the stock market crashed. Son's holding company SoftBank owned 29.5% of Alibaba, which was worth around $108.7 billion as of 23 October 2018. Although SoftBank's stake in Yahoo! had dwindled to 7%, Son established Yahoo! BroadBand in September 2001 with Yahoo! Japan in which he still owned a controlling interest. After a severe devaluation of SoftBank's equity, Son was forced to focus his attention on Yahoo! BB and BB Phone. So far, SoftBank has accumulated about $1.3 billion in debt. Yet, Yahoo! BB acquired Japan Telecom, the then third largest broadband and landline provider with 600,000 residential and 170,000 commercial subscribers. Yahoo! BB is now Japan's leading broadband provider. In June 2020, Son stepped down from the Alibaba board. By 2023, SoftBank had sold most of its Alibaba stake.

=== Arm Holdings ===
In July 2016, immediately following the UK's Brexit referendum, SoftBank announced plans to acquire Arm Holdings for £23.4 billion ($31.4 billion) which would be the largest ever purchase of a European technology company. In September 2016, SoftBank announced that the transaction was complete. The total acquisition price was approximately £24 billion ($34 billion).

In 2020, SoftBank Group agreed to sell U.K. chip designer Arm Limited to U.S. chip-maker Nvidia in a cash and stock deal initially worth $40 billion. The buy price, initially set at $40bn (cash and Nvidia shares) when first announced in September 2020, had risen closer to an estimated $66bn by 2022 given the intervening hike in Nvidia's stock – that would make this deal the biggest deal in the semiconductor market. Announcing the deal, SoftBank said the combination of Arm and Nvidia would create a computing company "that will lead the era" of artificial intelligence. However, the deal with Nvidia failed as announced in February 2022. After the collapse of the deal with Nvidia because of objections from U.S. and EU antitrust regulators, SoftBank Group Corp.'s chip maker Arm filed in 2023 with regulators confidentially for a U.S. stock market listing seeking to raise between $8 billion and $10 billion. The estimated value of the UK chipmaker being listed by SoftBank at that date ranged from $30bn to $70bn.

=== Sprint Corporation ===
In the 2010s, through his holdings in SoftBank, Son bought a 76% share in Sprint. SoftBank later accumulated further shares in Sprint to about 84% ownership.

Sprint and T-Mobile US merged in 2020 in an all-shares deal for $26 billion. By 2021, SoftBank Group Corp. had acquired 4.5% of Deutsche Telekom AG (parent company of T-Mobile) and sold its stake in T-Mobile US Inc. to the German telecommunications carrier.

=== Solar power ===
In response to the Fukushima Daiichi nuclear disaster in 2011, Masayoshi Son criticized the nuclear industry for creating "the problem that worries Japanese the most today" and engaged in investing in a nationwide solar power network for Japan. In March 2018, it was announced that Son was investing in the biggest ever solar project, a 200GW development planned for Saudi Arabia as part of its Vision 2030.

In July 2018, coverage indicated that Son "would underwrite most of 100 GW" of a planned 275 GW of new renewable provision in India by 2027.

=== Vision Fund ===
Established in 2017, SoftBank Group's investment vehicle, the $100 billion Vision Fund, was intended to invest in emerging technologies like artificial intelligence (AI), robotics and the internet of things. As of 2019, it aimed to nearly double its portfolio of AI companies from 70 to 125. However, it also invested in companies supposedly focused on revolutionizing real estate, transportation, and retail. Son claimed he would make personal connections with the CEOs of all companies funded by Vision Fund in order to enhance the creation of intertwined synergies among those companies. Son planned to raise $100 billion for a new fund every few years, investing about $50 billion a year in startups. In 2019, a second Vision Fund was created with a target of $108 billion, of which $38 billion would come from SoftBank itself. But the amount was scaled down due to lack of investing partners beyond SoftBank Group itself and Masayoshi Son.

As of 2020, the first fund had invested in 88 companies including Coupang, Didi, Doordash, Fanatics, Grab, Oyo, Paytm Uber, and WeWork, but had experienced an awkward fall from grace as the COVID-19 pandemic and a Chinese regulatory crackdown accelerated the exposure of the Japanese investment management conglomerate's portfolio weaknesses. Son became noted as a stock investor after the meteoric rise of Alibaba Group. He had invested $20 million in Jack Ma's Alibaba back in 2000 when it was a young Chinese startup company although regrettably passing up early opportunities to invest in both Amazon and Tesla. In addition, he raised his global profile as stock investor since starting SoftBank Vision Fund in 2017, creating an unprecedented investment vehicle of almost $100 billion to back technology startups. But by 2021, he was still struggling to persuade investors of the value of his efforts, in part because of major losses with companies such as WeWork, OneWeb, Wirecard, OYO Rooms, Katerra or Greensill Capital, and SoftBank Group's own stock chronically traded far below the value of its assets reflecting a discount associated with tax liabilities, risk, past performance, losses, performance fees and high probability of occurrence of several haircuts given Son's poor track record while running the Vision Fund and high enthusiasm for investing vast sums in loss-making companies at eye-popping valuations. By October 2021, Masayoshi Son had accelerated the pace of his startup investments quintupling the number of companies in his Vision Fund 2 portfolio in less than 9 months, SoftBank was cutting more deals with fewer staff than ever and the average investment amount per company had fallen from $943 million in Vision Fund 1 to $192 million in Vision Fund 2. In 2022, SoftBank Vision Fund posted a record 3.5 trillion yen loss ($27.4 billion) for its financial year ended on 31 March 2022 as the valuation of its stock portfolio plummeted. SoftBank's bad timing-prone, impulsive investment decisions regarding previously overhyped and consequently overvalued startups like Klarna, had plunged in value while some other investment firms had even been able to cash in before the startups' comedown to reap hundreds of millions of dollars in profit. In August 2022, Masayoshi Son said he was "embarrassed" and "ashamed" when asked to talk about the way he had run the SoftBank Vision Fund and Barron's characterized the fund as a "failed experiment" while The Wall Street Journal called SoftBank a "big loser" and Bloomberg elaborated on "Masayoshi Son's broken business model".

By November 2022, according to the Financial Times, Masayoshi Son personally owed SoftBank $4.7bn because of growing losses on the Japanese conglomerate's technology bets, which have also rendered the value of his stake in the group's second Vision Fund worthless. By February 2023, this personal debt totaled $5.1 billion according to Bloomberg calculations based on company disclosures. This debt on side deals he set up at SoftBank Group Corp. to boost his compensation, as losses mounted at its core Vision Fund venture capital arm, sparked controversy due to corporate governance concerns, but Son insisted that there was no conflict of interest. As of March 2023, while the collapse of Silicon Valley Bank was being investigated, over a third of Son's SoftBank shares had been reportedly posted as collateral for margin loans and the Financial Times was recalling signs of an emergent doomsday scenario for both SoftBank Group and Masayoshi Son.

=== Stargate ===
Son was named chairman of The Stargate Project, an American artificial intelligence infrastructure joint venture formed by SoftBank, OpenAI, Oracle Corporation and MGX, in January 2025.

=== Repositioning and AI-focused strategy (2023–2026) ===
From 2023 onward, SoftBank Group announced a strategic shift toward artificial intelligence infrastructure and semiconductor-related investments. During this period, Son publicly stated that AI development would become the primary focus of the group’s future strategy. In 2024 and 2025, SoftBank reported a return to profitability following earlier losses in the Vision Fund segment. Reuters reported that SoftBank’s net profit for the second quarter of fiscal year 2025 more than doubled to ¥2.5 trillion, supported in part by valuation gains related to AI-linked technology holdings.

In January 2025, Son’s appointment as chairman of the artificial-intelligence infrastructure venture Stargate LLC aligned with this broader strategic shift. Analysts cited by Reuters noted that SoftBank’s increased emphasis on Arm Holdings, data centers and AI-related computing capacity was consistent with the strategic direction Son had outlined.

SoftBank also carried out several restructuring measures during this period, including consolidations and selective divestments, which the company said were intended to strengthen liquidity and align with its AI-oriented strategy.

Son was included in Time's 100 Most Influential People in AI list in 2024.

On June 2, 2026, SoftBank Group’s market value surpassed Toyota’s to rank first in Japan, propelling founder Masayoshi Son’s net worth to $100.7 billion on the Forbes Real-Time Billionaires List. With this surge, he overtook Indian tycoon Mukesh Ambani to become Asia's richest person once again after more than a decade. Just three days later, on June 4, as market enthusiasm cooled, his ranking quickly slipped back behind Mukesh Ambani and Adani.

== Personal life ==
Son met his wife, Masami Ohno, the daughter of a prominent Japanese doctor, while both were students at the University of California, Berkeley. They married in 1979 and have two daughters. He lives in Tokyo in a three-story mansion that is valued at US$85 million and that has a golf range with technology to mimic the weather conditions and temperature of the world's top golf courses. He has also bought a home near Silicon Valley in Woodside, California, that cost him $117 million. He owns the SoftBank Hawks, a professional Japanese baseball team. Son has three brothers and is the second oldest of the siblings. His youngest brother, Taizo Son, is a serial entrepreneur and investor, having founded GungHo Online Entertainment and the venture capital firm Mistletoe. He is known for appreciating Burgundy wine, in particular La Tâche by Domaine de la Romanée-Conti.

When he went to the United States at 16 to attend high school and then the University of California, Berkeley, he decided to use his real Korean surname. In an interview with The New York Times, Son stated that "If I had stayed all the time in Japan, I probably would have become much more conservative, just as other Japanese."

== See also ==
- LY Corporation
