= Ed Zitron =

English author, journalist and public relations specialist

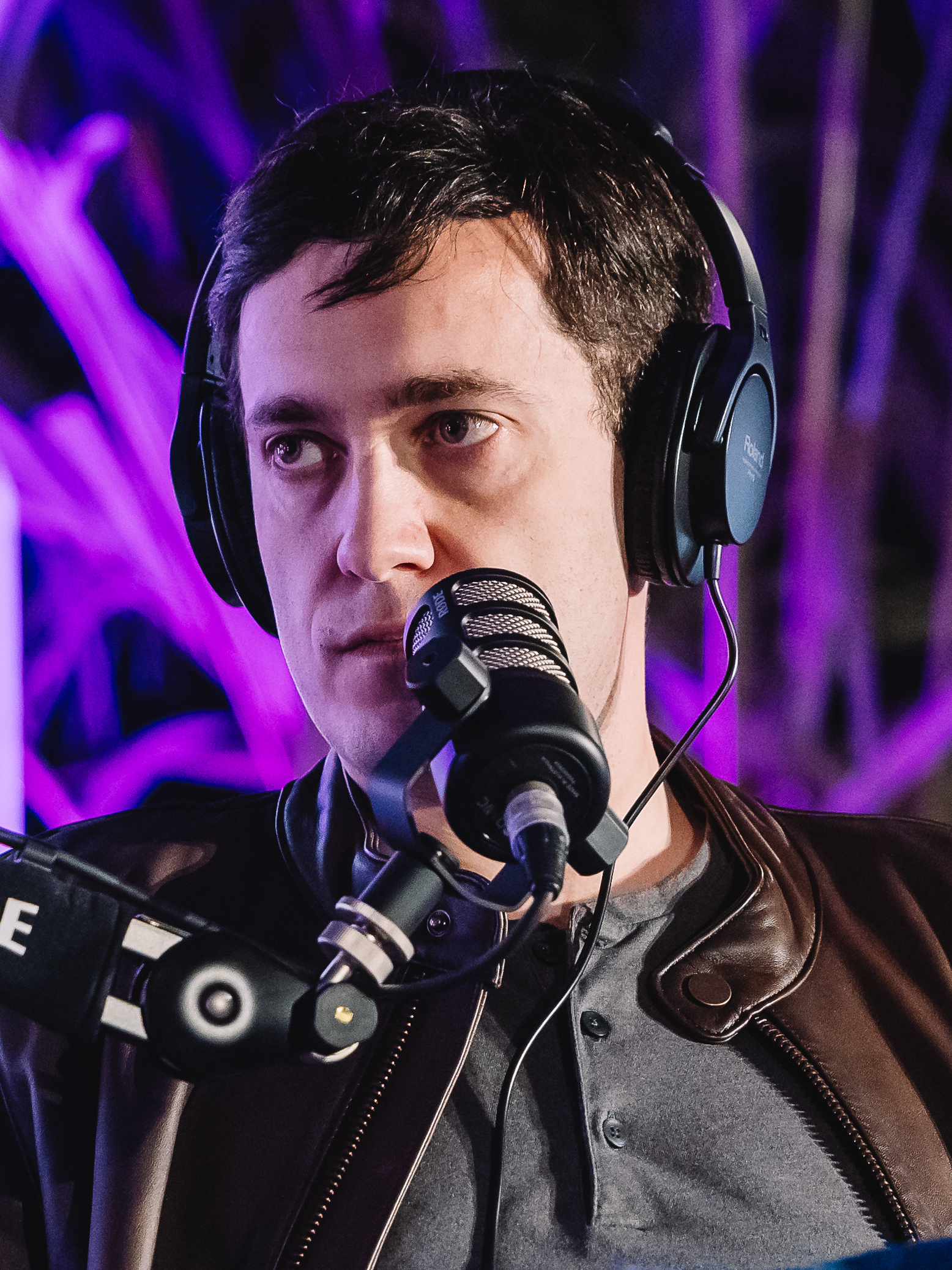
- Zitron in 2024
- Born: Edward Benjamin Zitron; 1986/1987 (age 39–40); Hammersmith, England
- Education: Aberystwyth University
- Occupations: Author; blogger; podcaster
- Website: wheresyoured.at

Edward Benjamin Zitron (born 1986/1987) is an English author, podcaster, journalist, and public relations specialist. He is a critic of the technology industry, particularly of artificial intelligence companies and the generative artificial intelligence boom of the 2020s. He hosts the Better Offline podcast, and writes the Where's Your Ed At newsletter.

== Early life and education ==
Edward Benjamin Zitron was born in Hammersmith in 1986 or 1987. He was privately educated at Latymer Upper School. He then attended Aberystwyth University in Aberystwyth, Wales, spending one year as an exchange student at Pennsylvania State University, United States.

== Career ==
Zitron began his career as a journalist, writing for a London-based video games magazine. He later worked for PC Zone until around 2008, during which time he also began working in public relations. He later worked for a New York City-based public relations firm and served as communications director for a company called Hometalk.com. In 2013, he founded the public relations agency EZPR.com, where he is the CEO. In the following years, he published two books about public relations. He has also been a critic of the PR industry.

In 2016, he started a podcast with Felix Biederman called The Scumbag. This lasted for two seasons between 2016 and 2018 and was a satirical look at darker corners of the internet.

Zitron began writing a newsletter about the tech industry in 2020, titled Where's Your Ed At, which had more than 50,000 subscribers as of February 2025. Zitron laid out his thesis that technology firms have focused on growth above all else, stifling innovation and harming consumers, in a 2023 newsletter issue titled "The Rot Economy". The post went viral. Zitron's "rot economy" theory has been likened to Cory Doctorow's concept of enshittification. In April 2024, a post titled The Man Who Killed Google Search sparked outcry about the company after Zitron accused Google CTO Prabhakar Raghavan of "killing" Google's search product by prioritizing profits for Google's advertising business over delivering relevant results.

In 2023, Cool Zone Media invited Zitron to create a podcast on their network. The podcast, called Better Offline, focuses on Silicon Valley and the tech industry, and particularly on the AI bubble.

In 2026, Zitron appeared on several major news outlets such as CNBC, MS NOW, and BBC to detail concerns about the economics of the AI boom, including AI company revenues and circular financing.

Zitron is writing a book about the ossification of major technology companies and the need for startups to challenge them, titled Why Everything Stopped Working.

=== Views ===
Alex Kirshner writing for Slate has described Zitron as "one of the most pugnacious critics of Big Tech". Zitron has been described as an "AI skeptic" or "AI critic", and has criticized both technology companies and the media for contributing to what he views as unwarranted hype around large language models. His stated belief is that the AI build-out financing in the 2020s is unsustainable, and predicts the bubble will burst.

In 2021 and 2022, Zitron wrote several articles defending remote work. In an article for The Atlantic, he argued that executives and middle managers advocating for mandatory in-office work feared remote work would make their jobs obsolete. Speaking to Vanity Fair, he explained, "I believe there is a large chunk of extremely performative work that is having a midlife crisis right now."

=== Publications ===
As of 2025 Zitron has authored two books:

- Zitron, Ed (2013). This Is How You Pitch: How To Kick Ass In Your First Years of PR.
- Zitron, Ed (2018). Fire Your Publicist: The PR and Publicity Secrets That Will Make You and Your Business Famous.

== Personal life ==
Zitron lives in New York City and Las Vegas. In 2012, he married psychology professor Jillian Knapp; they later divorced. Zitron later remarried and divorced again, having a child from the marriage.

Zitron has developmental coordination disorder and ADHD.

Zitron is a fan of the Las Vegas Raiders.
