= Michael Intrator =

American business executive

- Born: 1969 (age 56–57)
- Other name: Mike Intrator
- Education: Binghamton University, Columbia University
- Occupations: Business executive, entrepreneur
- Years active: 1998-present
- Organization(s): CoreWeave (CEO, chairman)

Michael Intrator (born 1969) is an American business executive. The CEO, co-founder, and chairman of CoreWeave, he was previously a commodities trader at Natsource Asset Management and co-founder and CEO of Hudson Ridge Asset Management.

== Early life and education ==
Born in 1969, Intrator earned his bachelor of arts degree in political science from Binghamton University in New York. He has a master of public administration (MPA) degree from Columbia University's School of International and Public Affairs.

== Career ==
=== Trading and Atlantic Crypto (1998–2018) ===
In 1998 Intrator joined Natsource Asset Management in New York. Trading carbon credits, he held titles such as principal portfolio manager and managing director. He worked with Natsource until July 2014. In 2013, he and Brian Venturo co-founded Hudson Ridge Asset Management, a natural gas hedge fund. Intrator was Hudson Ridge's CEO until January 2018.

While at Hudson Ridge, in 2016 Intrator and Venturo started a side project mining cryptocurrency, setting up servers in their Manhattan office space using Nvidia GPUs. In August 2017, they moved the servers to a garage in New Jersey and began expanding. Intrator, Venturo and Brannin McBee named the venture Atlantic Crypto in September 2017, with Intrator appointed CEO, chairman, and president. During the 2018 crypto crash, Atlantic Crypto purchased thousands of GPUs from crypto miners "for pennies on the dollar," using the hardware to bring in an estimated $80 million in revenue by mining ethereum.

=== CoreWeave founding (2019–2025) ===
Atlantic Crypto became CoreWeave in 2019, pivoting from mining ethereum to leasing compute capacity to video game rendering. In 2021 it had its first AI collaboration, building a cluster of 96 Nvidia A100 chips for Eleuther AI. In late 2022, Magnetar Capital invested $100 million in CoreWeave, with the funds used to purchase H100 chips. In January 2023, CoreWeave signed a $300 million deal with Inflection AI to build a 22,000-GPU AI cluster. CoreWeave was valued at $2 billion in April 2023.

With CoreWeave, Intrator initially had difficulty raising funds from venture capitalists in Silicon Valley, and instead turned to the debt markets of the East Coast. According to the Financial Times, Intrator "started to treat CoreWeave’s growth like a structured credit play," viewing its assets like securities that could be sold to investors. In the summer of 2023, he met with Blackstone executives, leading to a loan that the Financial Times called "one of the largest private financings in US corporate history," as well as Blackstone's biggest single loan commitment. The July 2023 deal saw Blackstone lead a $2.3 billion debt financing round into CoreWeave, with Intrator using CoreWeave's H100 chips as collateral. Intrator also convinced Magnetar to join the funding round.

In December 2023, Business Insider named Intrator one of the "top ten people in artificial intelligence hardware". In 2024 he was named an EY Entrepreneur of The Year The US Senate Committee on Commerce held a hearing in May 2025 on AI regulation, with Intrator testifying along with Sam Altman, Lisa Su, and Brad Smith. He has appeared on CNBC with Jim Cramer.

=== CoreWeave IPO (2025-2026) ===
CoreWeave went public with an initial public offering in March 2025, at which point Intrator owned 15% of the company. While the IPO had a "sluggish" start, stock price had tripled by June 2025. After CoreWeave proposed buying Core Scientific in July, its stock value dipped. He was #219 on the Forbes 400 list in 2025, and #823 on the 2026 Forbes Billionaires list.

== See also ==
- List of chief executive officers
