= Core Scientific =

Company

Core Scientific, Inc.
- Type: Public
- Traded as: Nasdaq: CORZ
- Industry: Cloud computing
- Founded: 2017; 9 years ago (as Atlantic Crypto) in Seattle
- Founders: Darin Feinstein; Mike Levitt
- Headquarters: Dover, Delaware, United States
- Key people: Adam Sullivan (CEO)
- Services: Access to high-performance computing centers, cloud computing, AI infrastructure, Bitcoin mining
- Revenue: ▲US$319 million (2025)
- Number of employees: 325 (2025)
- Website: www.corescientific.com

Core Scientific, Inc. is a US-based company with its registered office in Dover, Delaware. Core Scientific operates data centers. Originally active in bitcoin mining, the company has shifted its focus to building GPU cloud and colocation offerings for large customers' AI applications.

Core Scientific has been listed on the US technology exchange Nasdaq since its IPO in January 2022.

== History ==
Core Scientific was founded in Seattle in 2017, but later relocated its operational headquarters to Austin. Its founders include B. Kevin Turner, former COO of Microsoft. The company initially specialized in Bitcoin mining using renewable energy and digital asset infrastructure.

In 2021, Core Scientific announced plans to go public via a SPAC merger with Power & Digital Infrastructure Acquisition Corp. The IPO was completed in January 2022, with a valuation of over $4 billion at the time of listing, raising $190 million for Core Scientific.

However, at the end of 2022, Core Scientific filed for bankruptcy under Chapter 11 following a sharp drop in Bitcoin prices and high debt levels. Operations continued during the proceedings. In January 2024, the company emerged from bankruptcy after undergoing extensive restructuring and reorganization.

Since 2024, the company has been increasingly focusing on high-performance computing (HPC) for artificial intelligence. In 2025, contracts worth US$10 billion were signed for the operation of data centers.

In July 2025, CoreWeave announced its intention to acquire Core Scientific in a deal worth US$9 billion.

In March 2026, it was announced that Core Scientific had sold approximately $175 million worth of Bitcoin holdings to accelerate the expansion of its AI infrastructure. Bitcoin mining, on the other hand, is to be discontinued. In addition to selling its Bitcoin holdings, the company also took out a billion-dollar loan to build new data centers in several US states.

Core Scientific currently operates 10 data centers (as of March 2026) spread across seven US states.
