= Corning =

Corning may refer to:

== People ==
- Corning (surname)

== Places ==
In Canada:

- Corning, Saskatchewan

In the United States of America:

- Corning, Arkansas
- Corning, California
- Corning, Indiana
- Corning, Iowa
- Corning, Kansas
- Corning, Michigan
- Corning, Minnesota
- Corning, Missouri
- Corning (city), New York
- Corning (town), New York
- Corning, Ohio
- Corning, Pennsylvania
- Corning, Wisconsin

== Businesses and organizations ==
- Corning Inc., an American glass and ceramics manufacturer
- Dow Corning
- Owens Corning
- Corning Museum of Glass

== Other uses ==
- Corning (gunpowder), a gunpowder manufacturing process that improves consistency and power
- Corning, a method of making salt-cured meat
