= Corning (surname) =

Corning is a surname. Notable people with the surname include:

- Chris Corning (born 1999), American snowboarder
- Edwin Corning (1883–1934), American businessman and politician
- Erastus Corning (1794–1872), American businessman and politician
- Erastus Corning 2nd (1909–1983), mayor of Albany, New York
- Howard Corning (1879–1924), Canadian cattle farmer and politician
- James Leonard Corning (1855–1923), American neurologist
- Joy Corning (1932–2017), American politician
- Parker Corning (1874–1943), U.S. Representative from New York
- Peter Corning (born 1935), American biologist, consultant, and complex systems scientist
- Ron Corning (born 1971) American television host
- Sara Corning (1872–1969), Canadian nurse
- Thomas Corning (1842–1912), Canadian lawyer and politician
- William W. Corning (1829–1895), American merchant and politician
