= Timeline of the world's richest person =

This is a timeline of the wealthiest person in the world. As of October 2026, the world's richest person is Elon Musk. Other people who have had the title since the year 2000 include Larry Ellison, Bernard Arnault, Jeff Bezos, Bill Gates, Amancio Ortega, Carlos Slim and Warren Buffett.

== Timeline ==
Date	Name	Nationality	Primary source(s) of wealth	Notes
10 September 2025–present	Elon Musk	South Africa; Canada; United States	Tesla and SpaceX	Became the only person to ever have a verified net worth exceeding $1 trillion ($1,000 billion) in June 2026. (Note: However, there were people in history with a net worth greater than $1 trillion based on an adjustment for inflation. For example, King Mansa Musa (1280-1337), the King of Mali, had a net worth of $4.5 trillion by some estimates.)
10 September 2025 (briefly)	Larry Ellison	United States	Oracle Corporation	
6 June 2024–September 2025	Elon Musk	South Africa; Canada; United States	Tesla and SpaceX	
6 June 2024– 6 June 2024	Bernard Arnault	France	LVMH	
?–June 2024	Elon Musk	South Africa; Canada; United States	Tesla and SpaceX	
March 2024	Jeff Bezos	United States	Amazon	The title switched many times between Musk and Bezos this month.
June 2023–?	Elon Musk	South Africa; Canada; United States	Tesla and SpaceX	
December 2022–June 2023	Bernard Arnault	France	LVMH	
January 2021–?	Elon Musk	South Africa; Canada; United States	Tesla and SpaceX	
2017–January 2021	Jeff Bezos	United States	Amazon	
?–2017	Bill Gates	United States	Microsoft	
September 2016 (briefly)	Amancio Ortega	Spain	Inditex	
May 2013–?	Bill Gates	United States	Microsoft	
Early 2010–May 2013	Carlos Slim	Mexico	Grupo Carso	
2009	Bill Gates	United States	Microsoft	
2008	Warren Buffett	United States	Berkshire Hathaway	
1993–2008	Bill Gates	United States	Microsoft	Became the first person with a net worth exceeding $100 billion in April 1999. (Note: However, adjusted for inflation, the net worth of John D. Rockefeller at close to $1 billion (900 million) in 1913 would be over $674 billion dollars in today's world (2023).)

== See also ==
- Bloomberg Billionaires Index
- The World's Billionaires
