= AI data center =

Specialized data centers designed for artificial intelligence

An AI data center is a specialized data center facility designed for the computationally intensive tasks of training and running artificial intelligence (AI) and machine learning models. Unlike general-purpose data centers, they are often optimized for the parallel processing demands of AI workloads, typically using hardware such as AI accelerators (GPUs, TPUs) and high-speed interconnects.

The global push to construct these specialized facilities accelerated dramatically during the AI boom of the 2020s. In 2026, major tech companies were estimated to spend $650 billion on AI data centers. Their purchases of memory chips, particularly High Bandwidth Memory, led to a global memory supply shortage amid a broader competition for semiconductors, power, and infrastructure. About 70% of global computer memory production in the 2026 fiscal year has been purchased for AI data centers.

AI-focused data centers use around 60 kilowatts of electricity per server rack, while general-purpose data centers typically use around 10 kilowatts of electricity per rack.

By 2026, many U.S. communities had organized against the local construction of AI data centers, which have a large power and water footprint and generate heat, noise, and other pollutants. By July 2026, local community resistance had blocked the construction of AI data centers worth some $130 billion.

== Operators ==
As of August 2025, The Information tracked 18 planned or existing AI data centers in the United States, operated by Amazon Web Services, CoreWeave, Crusoe, Meta, Microsoft/OpenAI, Oracle, Tesla, and xAI. Other AI data center operators include Digital Realty and Alibaba. Data centers are also being built in China, India, Europe, Saudi Arabia, and Canada. The New Yorker described CoreWeave as the most prominent AI data center operator in the United States.

Two types of data center providers for machine learning have been noted in news media: hyperscalers and neoclouds. The Verge listed large technology companies such as Google, Meta, Microsoft, Oracle and Amazon as hyperscalers. The New York Times described neoclouds as "a new generation of data center providers", and the Wall Street Journal as essentially "like cloud providers, but specifically for AI." CoreWeave, Nebius, Nscale, and Lambda have been described as examples of neoclouds.

In January 2025, OpenAI, in partnership with Oracle and Softbank, announced the Stargate project, which as of September 2025 is composed of six built or proposed AI data centers in the United States.

In response to the Stargate project, Amazon launched in October 2025 an AI data center on 1,200 acres of farmland in Indiana. This data center, known as Project Rainier, is one of the largest AI data centers in the world, with Amazon spending $11 billion on the project. Rainier is specifically intended for training and running machine learning models from Anthropic. As of that time, this facility contains seven data centers (out of an estimated 30 planned) and will use 2.2 gigawatts of electricity (equivalent to 1 million households) and millions of gallons of water per year. Computer chips from Annapurna Labs and Anthropic, Trainium 2, were designed for use in such facilities. Amazon pumped millions of gallons of water out of the ground to construct the data center, and as of June 2025, Indiana state officials are investigating whether this dewatering process led to dry wells for local residents.

In November 2025, Anthropic announced a partnership with Fluidstack to develop artificial intelligence infrastructure in the United States, including data centers in New York and Texas, worth $50 billion.

Other AI data center projects include the Colossus supercomputer from xAI, a Louisiana-based project from Meta, Hyperion, expected to use 5 GW of power, and a second Ohio-based Meta project, Prometheus, with a capacity of 1 GW. A 3,200-acre AI data center, capable of 4.4-4.5 GW of power and located on the decommissioned Homer City Generating Station, is under construction as of 2025, and will use seven 30-acre gas generating stations supplied by EQT.

As of December 2025, CRH is working on over 100 data centers in the United States.

The increased interest in AI data centers has led to several executives from companies in that space becoming billionaires, including CoreWeave, QTS, Nebius, Astera Labs, Groq, Fermi (which is connected to former United States Secretary of Energy Rick Perry), Snowflake and Cipher Mining.

Several companies involved in cryptocurrency mining, such as Bitdeer, CoreWeave, Cipher Mining, TeraWulf, IREN, Core Scientific, and CleanSpark have also been involved with AI data centers.

== Finances ==
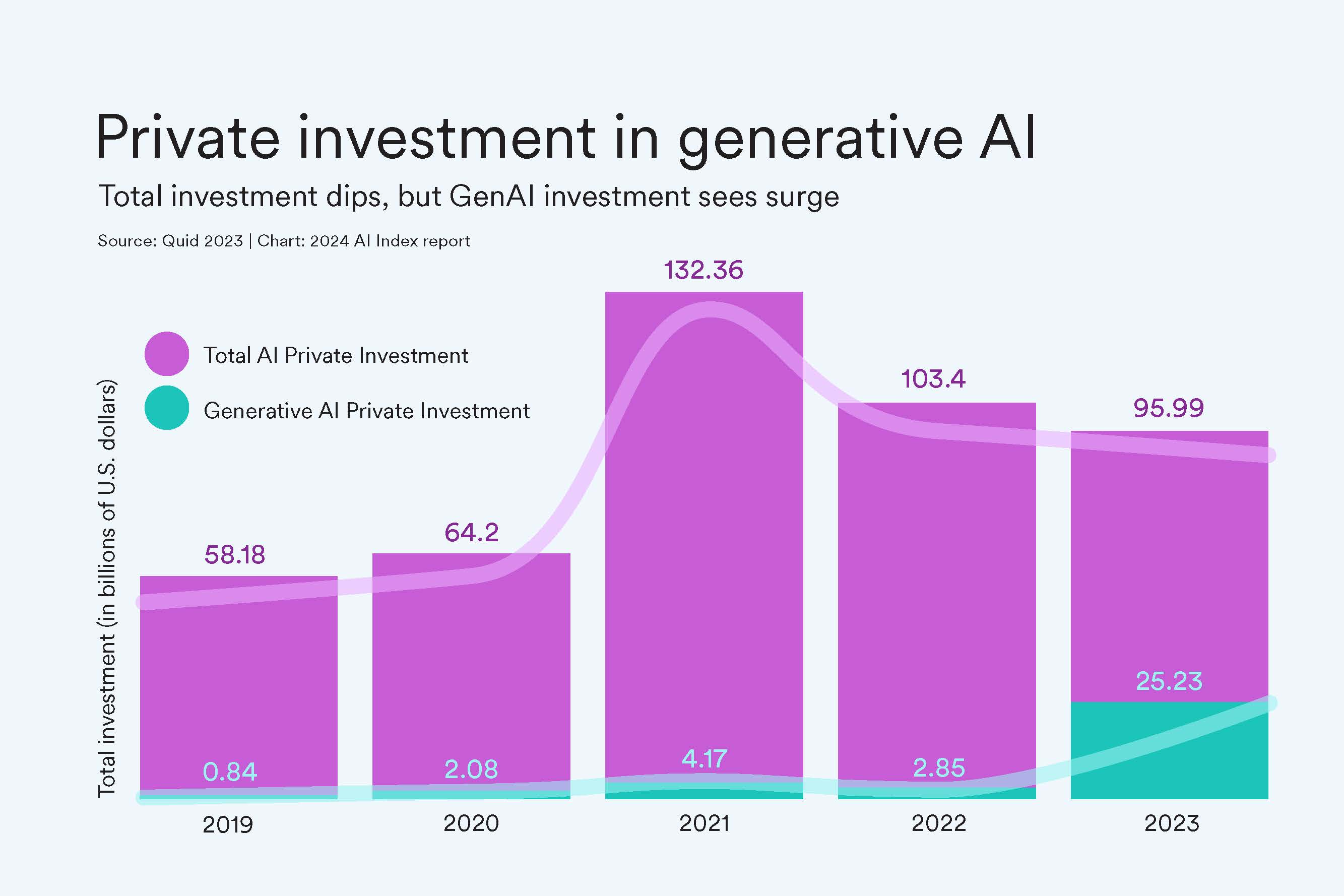

Between January and August 2024, Microsoft, Meta, Google and Amazon collectively spent $125 billion on AI data centers. Citigroup forecasted that $2.8 trillion would be spent on AI data centers by 2030, while McKinsey and Company estimated that almost $7 trillion would be spent globally by that time. According to S&P Global, $61 billion has been spent on the data center market as a whole in 2025, while debt issuance for data centers was $182 billion during the same year.

Large technology companies have offloaded the financial risks of building AI data centers by setting up special purpose vehicles or by contracting with neoclouds. For example, Meta's Hyperion was mostly funded by Blue Owl Capital, which did so using a bond offering from PIMCO. Those bonds were sold to a number of clients, including BlackRock. Meta did not borrow money itself and instead established a special purpose vehicle from which it would rent the data center. This deal was structured by Morgan Stanley for $30 billion, the largest known private capital transaction as of 2025.

Neoclouds such as CoreWeave have gone into debt to buy computer chips from Nvidia for their data centers, and the chips themselves have been used for loan collateral. As of December 2025, CoreWeave took out three GPU-backed loans, collectively worth $12.4 billion, from private credit firms (Blackstone, Coatue, BlackRock, PIMCO) and from banks (Goldman Sachs, JPMorgan Chase, Wells Fargo). Thus, these companies provide an indirect connection between private credit and established banks. Data centers have also established asset-backed securities, and debt for data centers has its own derivative financial products.

The real estate industry, including asset managers, public companies and private investors, has also invested in AI development.

== Energy sourcing ==
Fueled by growth in artificial intelligence, data centers' demand for power increased in the 2020s.

Share of total electricity demand used by data centers (2025)

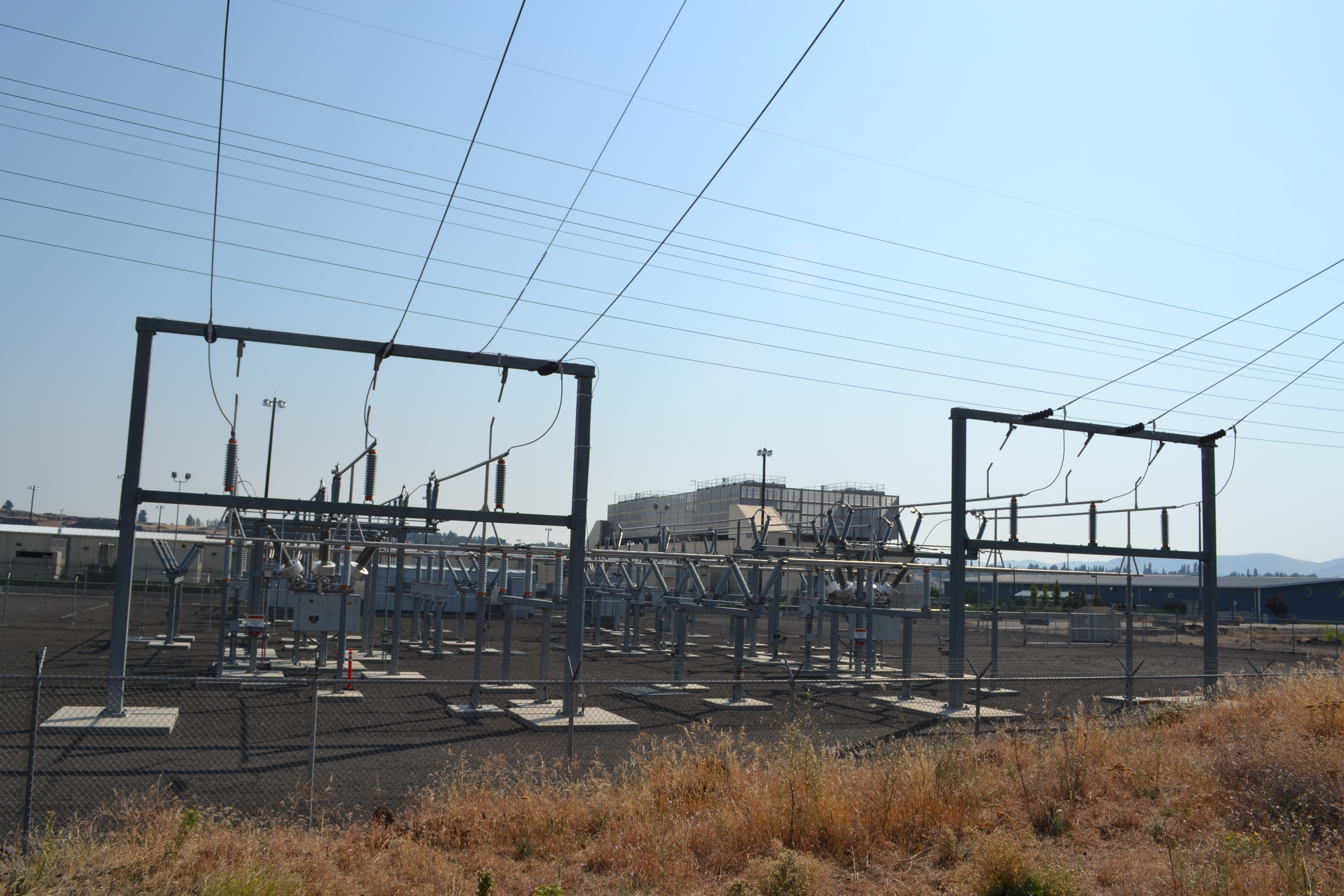
Google Data Center, The Dalles, Oregon

Energy consumption and the environmental impacts it creates are a central issue for data centers. Power draw ranges from a few kilowatts (kW) for small server racks to several tens of megawatts (MW) for large facilities. Modern hyperscale data centers can exhibit power densities exceeding 100 times those of conventional office buildings, primarily due to the high concentration of servers and cooling systems required to manage continuous digital workloads. For higher power density facilities, electricity costs are a dominant operating expense and account for over 10% of the total cost of ownership (TCO) of a data center.

As of 2024, data centers in the U.S. are primarily powered by natural gas, which supplies 40% of their electricity (with renewable energy at 24%, nuclear at about 20%, and coal at about 15%). The Associated Press reported that electricity for AI data centers in the U.S. would likely come from natural gas or oil, as companies prefer using currently available power plants, which primarily use fossil fuels. Fossil energy is also often cheaper in locations where data centers are developed, and experts believe that energy demands from generative AI and data centers would be difficult to fulfill with renewable energy alone. Some companies such as Google, Amazon, and Meta have expressed interest in nuclear power for their data centers. As of 2020, according to the IEA, solar photovoltaic-generated electricity is at its lowest cost in history. Other data centers, including xAI's Colossus, OpenAI's Stargate, and Meta's Prometheus use their own off-grid natural gas plants. Electric vehicle and lithium-ion batteries have also been used for powering data centers, including for Colossus.

Power utility companies upgrade their infrastructure to handle the demands of new data centers, and the cost of these changes typically falls on residential or smaller commercial consumers. In 2025, the Mountain Valley Pipeline announced plans to expand its capacity by 25% to meet energy needs for data centers.

In December 2025, the Federal Energy Regulatory Commission (FERC) issued a unanimous order allowing data centers in the U.S. to connect directly to power plants. United States Secretary of Energy Chris Wright expressed support for un-retiring coal plants to power AI data centers. Electricity demands from AI data centers have slowed or reversed the retirement of peaking power plants in the U.S. For example, in 2025, Southern Company announced that energy use from data centers would prevent the company from retiring coal-fired power plants as it had earlier promised. In Nevada, the Desert Research Institute (DRI) calculated that 35% of the state's energy production could go to data centers by the year 2030 if all projects planned in the state as of 2026 are completed. DRI also stated, in areas where there are clusters of data centers, local consumers may end up paying the extra cost of expanding infrastructure.

== Environmental footprint ==
Average AI data centers have an electricity footprint equivalent to 100,000 households, and use billions of gallons of water for cooling their hardware. In 2025, the International Energy Agency estimated that the larger AI data centers currently under construction could consume as much electricity as 2 million households. A 2024 report from the United States Department of Energy stated that data centers overall used 17 billion gallons of water per year in the United States, primarily due to "rapid proliferation of AI servers", and that this usage was forecasted to grow to nearly 80 billion gallons by 2028. Researchers estimated that AI data centers in the United States would emit 24–44 million metric tons of carbon dioxide and use 731–1,125 million cubic meters of water per year between 2024 and 2030.

Peaking power plants, which have been proposed as a power source for AI data centers, emit sulfur dioxide and have historically been located disproportionately near communities of color in the United States.

Reciprocating internal combustion engines, proposed as another power source for a data center, emit PM 2.5, nitrogen oxides, and volatile organic compounds.

== Global memory supply shortage ==
The construction of AI data centers during the AI boom starting in 2025 has exhausted the global supply of the computer memory. To meet demand from AI servers, the three major DRAM manufacturers, Samsung, SK Hynix, and Micron, prioritized production of High Bandwidth Memory (HBM) and high-end server DRAM, contributing to a global memory supply shortage and intensifying competition for advanced memory chips. Because HBM consumes far more fabrication capacity than conventional memory—producing a single bit of HBM requires roughly three times the wafer capacity of DDR5.

The resulting price increases and shortages have affected computer memory broadly, including HBM, DRAM, and NAND flash memory.

Under an agreement with Samsung and SK Hynix, the Stargate project alone is set to receive 900,000 DRAM wafers per month, roughly 40% of total global DRAM production.

== In the United States ==
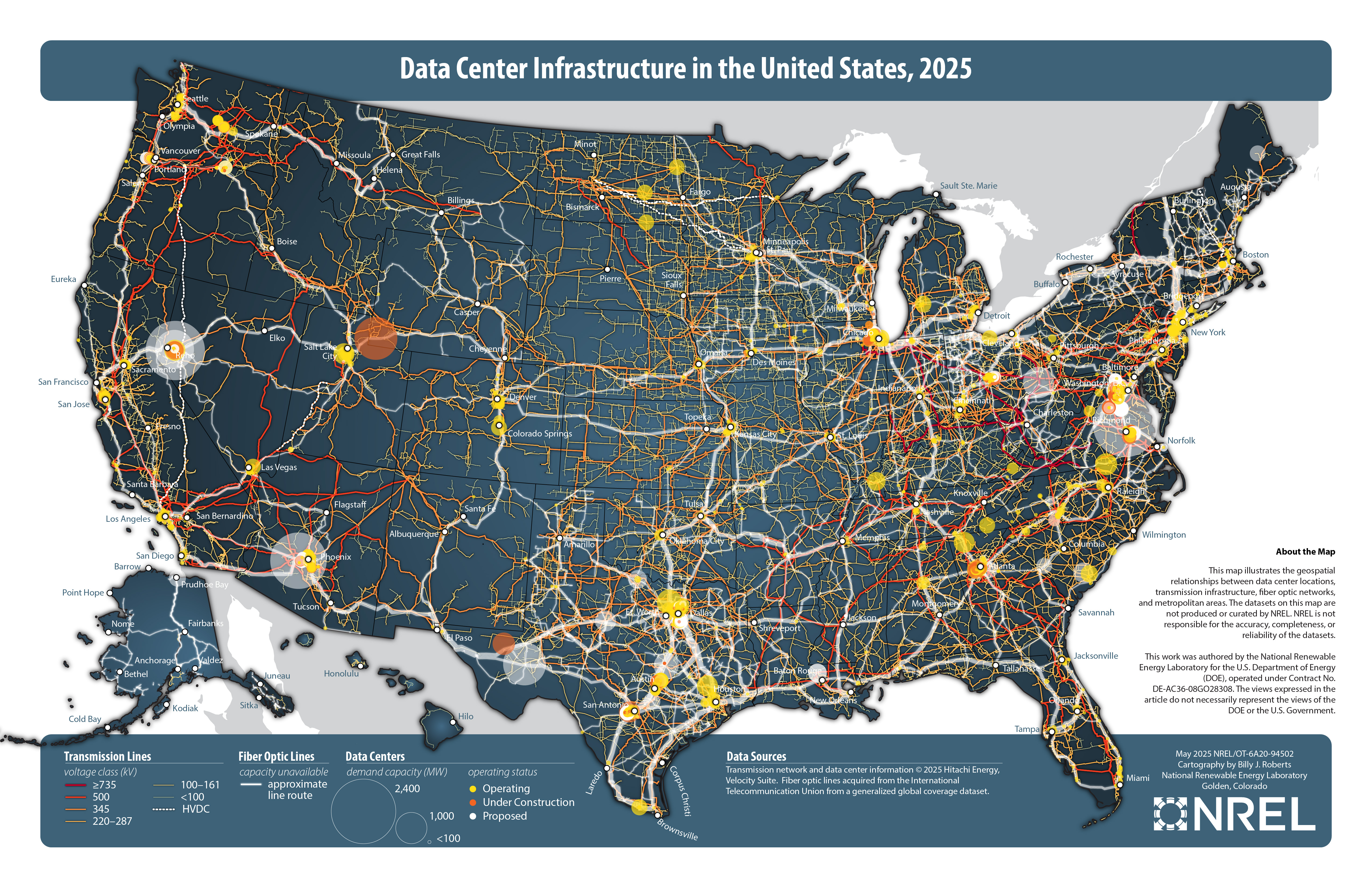
Data center infrastructure in the United States (2025)

In the United States, both the Biden administration and second Trump administration supported the construction of AI data centers. In January 2025, then-president Joe Biden signed an executive order for federal government agencies to support AI data centers on federal sites built by private companies, study their effect on energy prices, and encourage their use of renewable energy. In April 2025, the United States Department of Energy suggested 16 possible sites, including Los Alamos National Laboratory, Sandia National Laboratories and Oak Ridge National Laboratory. In its July 2025 AI Action Plan, the second Trump administration supported increased production of AI data centers.

Several US states have incentivized local data center construction. For example, in 2024, lawmakers in Michigan approved tax breaks for data center equipment and construction material. Some data center companies have also invested or promised to invest in the infrastructure of local communities.

In December 2025, Democratic senators Elizabeth Warren, Chris Van Hollen, and Richard Blumenthal wrote to seven technology companies (Google, Microsoft, Amazon, Meta, CoreWeave, Digital Realty, and Equinix) that they will investigate the effects of those companies' operations on consumer energy bills, highlighting AI data centers in particular. That same month, 25 Democratic lawmakers wrote to the inspector general of the United States Department of Commerce over possible conflict of interest concerns involving secretary of commerce Howard Lutnick and AI data centers. Lutnick met with a co-founder of Fermi, which proposed an AI data center project financed by Cantor Fitzgerald and Newmark Group.

AI Infrastructure Coalition (AIIC), an organization led by Brian O. Walsh, Kyrsten Sinema, and Garret Graves, has supported Trump's AI Action Plan, with Sinema becoming personally involved in a local meeting on an AI data center in Arizona. Venture capital firm Andreessen Horowitz, Big Tech companies (Google, Meta, Microsoft), telecommunications companies (Cisco, Corning Inc., Lumen Technologies), data center providers (Digital Realty, QTS), energy companies (Duke Energy, Entergy, ExxonMobil, NextEra Energy), and utility companies (PG&E, Pinnacle West Capital) are members of AIIC as of November 2025. AIIC has been supported by Hogan Lovells.

According to Goldman Sachs in 2025 an addition half million workers will be needed by 2030 to build the power infrastructure, which is acute because of AI data center build out.

In October 2026 Google says Gemini grew from 400 million to 1 billion users in three months.

=== Concerns and opposition ===
Some analysts have expressed concerns about overbuilding of AI data centers, warning that their infrastructure risks obsolescence due to changes in demand and technology. Estimates for the lifespan of the GPUs used to power data centers range from one to eight years. By contrast, CPUs in more traditional data centers have a shelf life of about 5–7 years. Machine learning model training causes significant stress on computer chips.

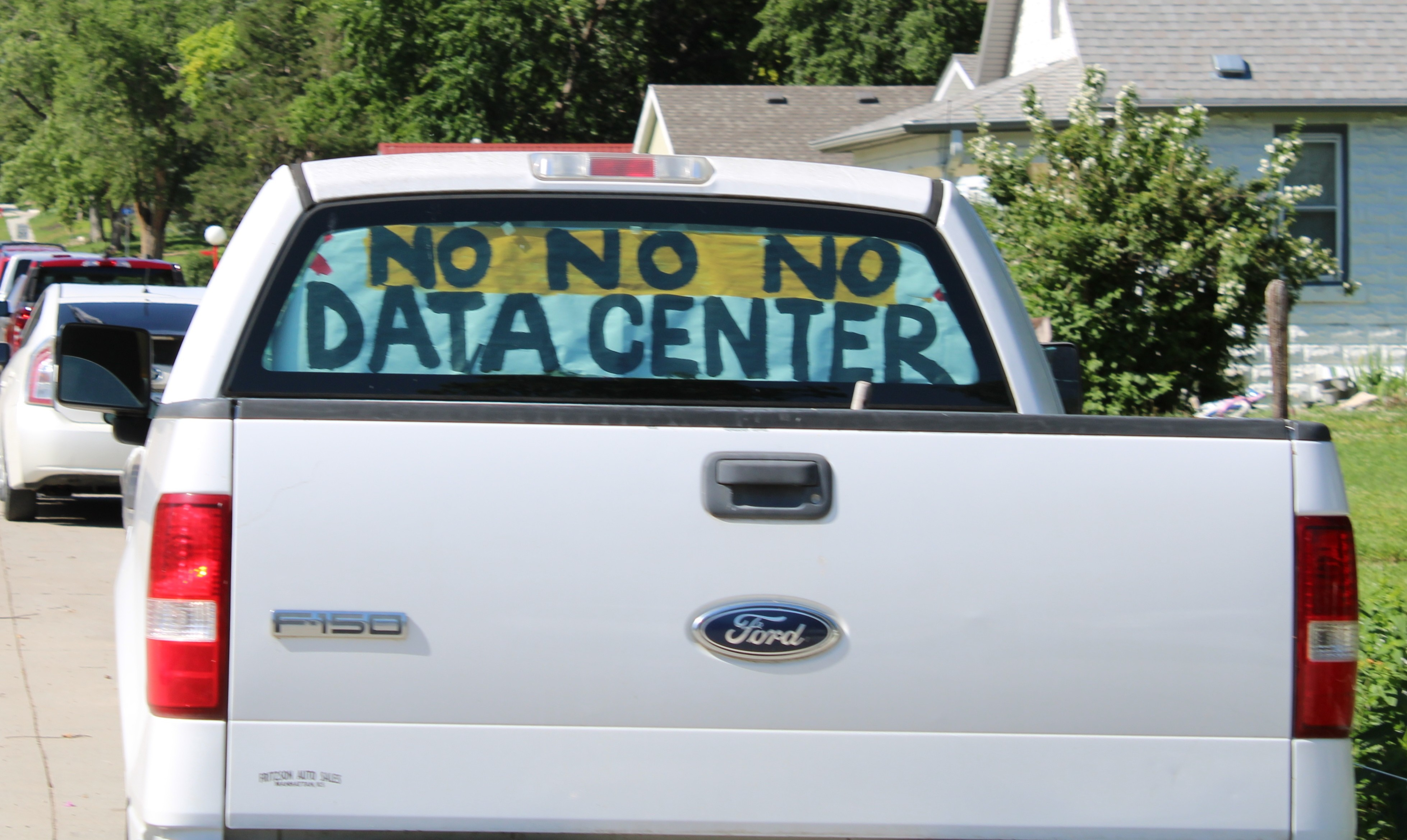
Anti-data-center sentiment in rural Kansas neighborhood

Advocates have also linked data center construction to the AI bubble. Wisconsin Watch expressed concern that data centers could become stranded assets in the context of an AI bubble, leaving energy customers to pay for the costs. Journalists have warned that the large number of links between actors and organizations in the AI ecosystem, as well as the large number of companies involved, each indicate strong risks for the global economy and financial markets.

Harris Kupperman, the founder of hedge fund Praetorian Capital, questioned the economics of AI data centers, concluding that they need about $1 trillion of revenue for profitability.

In November 2025, the North American Electric Reliability Corporation warned that building new data centers could negatively affect the electrical grid and cause power outages during extreme weather. The independent monitor of PJM Interconnection warned that its power grid cannot support new data centers and supported a federal moratorium on data centers.

Machine learning developers, when training large language models, often use data centers at their full capacity, conflicting with other users (including households) during peak usage, which may lead to blackouts.

Power disruptions in data centers can cause errors in machine learning model calculations ("silent data corruption").

Large technology companies who are building data centers have asked public officials and land owners to sign non-disclosure agreements and have appeared to use shell companies. In one case, when a joint OpenAI-Oracle data center was rejected by Saline Township in Michigan, landowners and developers responded by suing the town. The developers acquired the land from the resulting settlement. The Michigan Public Service Commission approved DTE Energy to provide power to the data center, part of Stargate. The approval was part of an ex parte motion, with no public input.

In 2025, over 230 groups have signed a letter supporting a moratorium on constructing AI data centers in the United States, concerned by impact on the environment and energy bills. Signatories include Food & Water Watch, Greenpeace, Friends of the Earth and Physicians for Social Responsibility. Senator Bernie Sanders has also supported a moratorium on AI data centers.

Ashley LaMont, of Honor the Earth, argued that data centers on tribal lands would not help Native Americans obtain data sovereignty.

The NAACP has also expressed opposition to AI data centers.

== In space ==
Several tech companies, including Starcloud, Google, Nvidia, Blue Origin and SpaceX, have announced projects for or otherwise expressed interest in building data centers in outer space. Google announced Project Suncatcher, which plans to test whether its Tensor Processing Unit (TPU) chips (which are specifically designed for machine learning) can function in the environment of space. The company aims to deploy satellites with these chips in a data center by 2027. In November 2025, Starcloud, a startup supported by Nvidia, launched a satellite with an Nvidia H100 GPU that the company used to deploy and develop a large language model. CNBC reported that this model, NanoGPT, was the first model trained in space. Starcloud deployed a second model based on Google's Gemma.
