= Vendor finance =

In which a vendor lends money to purchase their products

Vendor finance is a form of lending in which a vendor, instead of a bank or financial institution, lends money to be used by the borrower to buy the vendor's products or property. Vendor finance is usually in the form of deferred loans from, or shares subscribed by, the vendor. The vendor often takes shares in the borrowing company. This category of finance is generally used where the vendor's expectation or knowledge of the value of the business extending the credit is higher than that of the borrower's bankers, and usually at a higher interest rate than would be offered elsewhere.

A study conducted in 2004 found businesses were significantly more likely to have used vendor financing (trade credit) or credit cards when denied a bank loan. This effect was seen most in businesses 1–5 years old and less in businesses aged 6–10 or 11–15 years old.

Vendor finance bridges the valuation gap due to the time value of money. If the buyer of a business does not have to repay the vendor for the vendor loan for a few years, then the value of that portion of the purchase price is worthless. In some cases there is an interest charge on the vendor loan, but in other cases it is simply a deferred payment. Vendor finance is different from an Earnout because it is not contingent on performance. Since there is no contingency, vendor finance is risker for the buyer than an earn-out.

Vendor finance can also be used when the buyer does not have the funds to purchase the entire business. In this case the vendor creates a loan with an interest charge to help the buyer complete the purchase and help the seller complete the sale, usually on better terms for the seller.

Vendor financing became a prominent method to finance build-out of AI infrastructure in the mid-2020s, as chipmakers and cloud-computing providers have extended capital, guarantees and purchase commitments to the capital-hungry companies that buy their hardware and services. The practice is most closely associated with chipmaker Nvidia, whose graphics processing units (GPUs) power most large-scale AI training and inference, and with the "hyperscalers"—large cloud-computing providers such as Microsoft, Amazon and Alphabet – and OpenAI and Anthropic, builders of the leading large language models. As these companies are simultaneously one another's investors, suppliers and customers, commentators have described the resulting arrangements as "circular financing" or "circular deals".

== See also ==
- Circular investment – Investment so that the investee can buy from the investor
- Hire purchase – Form of arrangement
- Tied aid – International transfer of resources with geographic limits on procurement and spending
