= CoreWeave =

American technology company

CoreWeave, Inc.
- Type: Public
- Traded as: Nasdaq: CRWV (Class A); Nasdaq-100 component
- Industry: Cloud computing
- Founded: September 21, 2017; 9 years ago (as Atlantic Crypto) in New Jersey
- Founders: Michael Intrator; Brian Venturo; Brannin McBee; Peter Salanki
- Headquarters: Livingston, New Jersey, United States
- Area served: International
- Key people: Michael Intrator (CEO)
- Services: Access to high-performance computing centers, supercomputers, cloud computing, AI infrastructure
- Revenue: ▲US$5.13 billion (2025)
- Operating income: ▼US$−46 million (2025)
- Net income: ▼US$−1.2 billion (2025)
- Total assets: ▲US$49.3 billion (2025)
- Total equity: ▲US$3.34 billion (2025)
- Number of employees: 2,189 (2025)
- Website: coreweave.com

CoreWeave, Inc. is an American cloud-computing company based in Livingston, New Jersey. As of 2026, the company operates 51 AI data centers, specialized data centers designed for higher parallel computing performance via heavy use of graphics processing units (GPUs).

Founded as Atlantic Crypto in 2017 the company focused on high-performance computing, CoreWeave has its own data centers operating in the United States and Europe, with some dedicated to multiple companies and some to a single client. Its $1.6 billion supercomputer data center for Nvidia in Plano, Texas, has been described by Nvidia as the fastest AI supercomputer in the world.

== History ==
=== 2017–2021 ===
The company was founded in 2017 in New Jersey by three commodities traders—Michael Intrator, Brian Venturo, and Brannin McBee, as well as Peter Salanki. Originally known as Atlantic Crypto, it initially operated as a cryptocurrency mining company, mining ethereum using graphics processing units. In the wake of the 2018 cryptocurrency crash, in 2019 the company was renamed CoreWeave, leveraging its large inventory of GPUs to start providing cloud computing infrastructure to companies.

=== 2022–2023 ===
CoreWeave was operating three data centers in 2022, all in the United States. In the summer of 2022, the company invested heavily in Nvidia's latest and fastest H100 chips, spending around $100 million on the purchases. CoreWeave launched an accelerator program in October 2022, which gives startup companies "compute credits in addition to discounts and other hardware resources on the CoreWeave cloud". As the market demand for AI processing increased in 2022 and 2023, CoreWeave, which had unique access to Nvidia GPUs, saw its business jump considerably. With CoreWeave signing clients such as Stability AI, CoreWeave continued to buy chips and build out new data centers, with its data center technicians installing 6,000 miles of fiber-optic cabling in 2023. In April 2023, Nvidia invested $100 million in CoreWeave. The company was valued around $2 billion by May 2023. In August 2023, CoreWeave secured a $2.3 billion debt financing facility led by Magnetar Capital and Blackstone by using Nvidia's H100 GPUs as collateral. The deal marked the first time that H100-based hardware had been used as collateral, which attracted some note in the business press.

=== 2024 ===
The company raised $1.1 billion in funding led by Coatue Management in May 2024, reportedly valuing the company at $19 billion. According to a Bloomberg News report in October 2024, Cisco was set to invest in CoreWeave as well, reportedly valuing the company at $23 billion. Also in October 2024, CoreWeave announced that it secured a $650 million credit line for expanding its operations and data centers. Goldman Sachs, JPMorgan Chase and Morgan Stanley were among those who led the financing.

The company had announced a plan by 2024 to invest $978.6 million in U.K. data centers. In June 2024, CoreWeave's $1 billion offer to buy high-performance computing (HPC) capacity vendor Core Scientific was rejected. In November 2024, Tom's Hardware reported that CoreWeave was among the first cloud service providers to receive shipments of Nvidia's new Blackwell hardware.

In November 2024, CoreWeave closed a $650 million secondary share sale, with investors such as Jane Street, Magnetar Capital, Fidelity Management, and Macquarie Capital. Bloomberg reported in November 2024 that CoreWeave was planning a 2025 initial public offering, and had selected Morgan Stanley, Goldman Sachs, and JPMorgan Chase to manage.

=== 2025 ===
In February 2025, CoreWeave was reported to be the first cloud provider to make Nvidia GB200 NVL72 chips available via cloud computing. IBM announced it would use the GB200 clusters to train its Granite AI. In March 2025, CoreWeave announced the acquisition of the AI platform developer Weights & Biases, reportedly for around $1.7 billion. Also in March, OpenAI signed a five-year cloud-computing contract worth approximately $12 billion with CoreWeave for its AI infrastructure needs. The deal allowed OpenAI to acquire a stake in CoreWeave through a private placement of $350 million worth of shares during the IPO.

CoreWeave filed its Form S-1 in March 2025 and planned to list on the Nasdaq under the symbol "CRWV". According to the filing, Microsoft accounted for over 60 percent of CoreWeave's revenue in 2024. Microsoft made up about 67% of CoreWeave's revenue in 2025, compared with 62% in 2024, according to company filings.CoreWeave reduced its IPO size from $2.7 billion to $1.5 billion on March 27, 2025. It went public on March 28, 2025, raising $1.5 billion, and was the largest AI-related listing by amount raised, according to Dealogic.

In July 2025, CoreWeave became the first company to deploy Nvidia Blackwell Ultra GPUs (GB300 NVL72) commercially, with Dell providing the servers.

Core Scientific agreed in July 2025 to be acquired by CoreWeave for $9 billion, but the deal was rejected by Core Scientific shareholders in October 2025.

In September 2025, CoreWeave agreed to acquire OpenPipe, a startup specializing in reinforcement learning tools for training AI agents.

In October 2025, CoreWeave agreed to acquire Monolith AI, a developer of AI and ML applications for physics.

=== 2026 ===
CoreWeave bond yields

In January 2026, CoreWeave received $2 billion in investment from NVIDIA at a purchase price of $87.20 per share as they expand their partnership to boost CoreWeave's data center build out. In March 2026, CoreWeave secured $8.5 billion in new financing, using major AI infrastructure contracts with Meta Platforms as collateral. Also that month, it signed a multi-year agreement with Perplexity AI to support Perplexity's inference workloads on the Coreweave cloud platform.

In April 2026, CoreWeave announced a multi-year agreement with Anthropic to provide Nvidia GPU capacity for production-scale Claude inference workloads, and separately priced an upsized $3.5 billion convertible senior notes offering, developments that came within 48 hours of a separate $21 billion expansion of its infrastructure partnership with Meta.

In May 2026, CoreWeave reported first-quarter revenue of $2.08 billion, exceeding analyst expectations of $1.97 billion and more than doubling year-over-year. Revenue backlog reached nearly $100 billion. As of June 30, 2026, CoreWeave reported total debt of approximately $35.1 billion in its Q2 2026 quarterly filing, split between recourse (approximately $31.4 billion) and non-recourse (approximately $3.7 billion) facilities structured against hyperscaler contract commitments. In June 2026, Coreweave joined the Nasdaq-100. By September, Coreweave was providing access to the newest Vera Rubin chips. In September 2026, Time reported that Coreweave hosted "the infrastructure of nine out of 10 leading AI labs."

== Key people and employees ==
Headquartered in New Jersey, as of 2025 the company had around 1,450 employees. Michael Intrator is the company's chief executive and founder, alongside his other cofounders Brian Venturo as chief strategy officer, Brannin McBee as chief development officer, and Peter Salanki as CTO. In 2024, Nitin Agrawal from Google joined as CFO. In Aug. 2024, Sachin Jain, formerly of Oracle's AI department, was hired as chief operating officer. Simultaneously, Chen Goldberg, formerly of Google, was hired as senior VP of engineering. In October 2024, Michelle O'Rourke was named its new chief people officer, and in Feb. 2025, Glenn Hutchins was appointed the lead independent director.

== Cloud platform and software ==
The CoreWeave Cloud Platform consists of infrastructure built on a Kubernetes-native architecture, designed to support large-scale, GPU-intensive tasks. CoreWeave's cloud-based infrastructure is specifically designed for AI use cases. Its Mission Control software allows customers to control and verify the performance of the hardware components they're utilizing.

== Data centers ==
CoreWeave has its own data centers operating in both the United States and Europe. In 2025, it had 32 data centers, with a total of 250,000 GPUs. This was a significant growth from 2024, when the company had thirteen data centers across the United States and two in the United Kingdom. It opened a headquarters in London in 2024, as well as two UK data centers. Also in 2024, CoreWeave signed a lease to build a $1.2 billion data center in a 280,000 sq ft space at the Northeast Science and Technology Center in Kenilworth, New Jersey.

While some of its data centers are rented by multiple companies, others are dedicated to a single client or special projects. Its $1.6 billion supercomputer data center for Nvidia in Plano, Texas, for example, is around 450,000 square feet and utilizes over 3,500 H100s. In September 2023, Nvidia and CoreWeave asserted that the project was the fastest AI supercomputer in the world.

CoreWeave also rents high-performance computing (HPC) capacity from Core Scientific.

In December 2024, Canadian AI startup Cohere announced plans to build a multi-billion data center built and operated by CoreWeave.

In Dec. 2024, Dell and CoreWeave began partnering on infrastructure. In 2025, CoreWeave and Microsoft invested in launching AI Hub in New Jersey, which is a project by the New Jersey Economic Development Authority, Plug and Play, and Princeton University.

== See also ==
- List of artificial intelligence companies
