= Stargate LLC =

American AI venture

- Type: Joint venture
- Industry: Artificial intelligence
- Founded: January 21, 2025; 21 months ago
- Founders: Sam Altman; Larry Ellison; Masayoshi Son
- Headquarters: United States
- Area served: Worldwide
- Key people: Masayoshi Son (chairman)
- Total assets: US$100 billion (2025)
- Owners: OpenAI (40%); SoftBank Group (40%); Oracle Corporation; MGX

The Stargate Project, incorporated in Delaware as Stargate LLC, is an American multinational artificial intelligence (AI) joint venture created by OpenAI, SoftBank, Oracle, and investment firm MGX. The venture plans to spend up to US$500 billion to build AI infrastructure in the United States by 2029. It has been planned since 2022 and was formally announced on January 21, 2025, by United States president Donald Trump. SoftBank's CEO Masayoshi Son is the venture's chairman.

Because of its large scale, the program has been compared to the Manhattan Project.

== Background ==
Footage from the press conference released by the White House

The term "Stargate" was used by OpenAI and Microsoft in 2024 to designate an earlier US$100 billion AI supercomputer project. It was named after the 1994 film Stargate, in which the stargates were portals to other worlds.

== Announcement ==
On January 21, 2025, President Donald Trump announced the venture at a White House press conference, accompanied by Sam Altman from OpenAI, Larry Ellison from Oracle and Masayoshi Son from SoftBank. Trump called it "the largest AI infrastructure project in history", and he indicated that he would use emergency declarations to expedite the project's development, particularly regarding energy infrastructure. Larry Ellison contended that Stargate could lead to the AI-facilitated production of mRNA vaccines against cancer, and that such vaccines could be designed "robotically", or by leveraging AI, "in about 48 hours".

According to Ellison, 10 data centers were being built in Abilene, Texas, with plans to expand to more states and countries, like the United Kingdom, Norway, Japan and the United Arab Emirates. Trump said that he would use executive orders to help build the venture's infrastructure. The new venture claims that it will create more than 100,000 jobs in the United States. Altman has said that SoftBank will have the "financial responsibility" of the venture and OpenAI will have the "operational responsibility". Arm, Microsoft, Nvidia, Oracle, and OpenAI are the key initial technology partners.

Coinciding with the project announcement, Microsoft and OpenAI signed a new agreement that grants Microsoft a right of first refusal on future OpenAI cloud computing capacity, while allowing OpenAI to use other cloud providers if Microsoft declines.

== Financing ==
The venture launched with an initial investment of $100 billion, with plans to increase it to $500 billion by 2029. Elon Musk, CEO of OpenAI's competitor xAI, said that the venture lacked the financing to meet the promised investment levels. This was later denied by Sam Altman. Arm CEO Rene Haas stated that the financial backing behind the project is "quite solid". The Information reported that Softbank and OpenAI have each committed $19 billion of capital to initially fund Stargate and would each hold 40% ownership interest in the joint venture, while Oracle and MGX would each contribute $7 billion, and the remaining funds would be sourced from limited partners and debt financing. According to the Financial Times, the infrastructure being built as part of the project will be exclusive to OpenAI. The Wall Street Journal reported that SoftBank, the main financial backer for Stargate, could collect only a 10% equity funding and the remaining would come from debt or debt-like fundings.

On April 1, 2025, Softbank announced that its first $10 billion funding was expected to be borrowed from Japanese bank Mizuho and other lenders.

On May 22, 2025, JPMorgan Chase agreed to lend $2.3 billion to OpenAI and its partners for the Stargate data center projects in Abilene, Texas. The project is being developed by a joint venture involving Blue Owl Capital, Crusoe Energy Systems, and Primary Digital Infrastructure, and is leased to Oracle Corporation.

On August 7, 2025, Bloomberg reported that the project had not started and no funds were raised to meet the project's initial $500 billion budget. Market uncertainty, American trade policy, and AI hardware valuations caused the delay according to a Bloomberg News report, and it also added that TSMC was earlier approached by Masayoshi Son to invest US$1 trillion in Arizona.

== Infrastructure development and partnerships ==
On April 17, 2025, the Financial Times reported that OpenAI and Oracle weighed a future investment in the United Kingdom as they explored overseas locations to build out AI infrastructure.

On May 16, 2025, Nvidia, Cisco, and OpenAI announced plans to help build the "UAE Stargate" artificial intelligence data center in United Arab Emirates. UAE Stargate is expected to open in 2026. On May 22, 2025, the UAE AI firm G42, Oracle, SoftBank Group and again OpenAI, Nvidia and Cisco announced a partnership to build Stargate UAE.

On September 23, 2025, OpenAI announced 5 new data center sites under Stargate with sites being located in Shackelford County, Texas; Doña Ana County, New Mexico; Lordstown, Ohio; Milam County, Texas; and a midwestern United States site whose location is not yet publicly known. This brings Stargate to nearly 7 gigawatts of planned capacity and over $400 billion in investment over the next three years. They said that this puts them on a clear path to securing the full $500 billion, 10-gigawatt commitment they announced in January, by the end of 2025, ahead of schedule.

On October 10, 2025, OpenAI and Sur Energy signed a letter of intent to explore the development of an AI data center in Argentina's Patagonia, named Stargate Argentina. This project, the first Stargate site in Latin America, would represent an estimated investment of up to $25 billion and have a capacity of up to 500 megawatts, making it the largest in Latin America, surpassing existing facilities in Brazil, Chile and Mexico. If completed, it is expected to accelerate AI development in the region while bringing economic opportunities to a traditionally cold and sparsely populated region. As of May 2026, there had been no further progress on the project beyond the letter of intent, with Argentina's Economy Ministry stating that they had not received a formal application for their large venture incentive scheme.

AMD will supply up to 6 gigawatts of its Instinct GPUs, and OpenAI may buy a 10% stake in AMD if milestones are met. Broadcom will also supply 10 gigawatts of custom hardware.

== See also ==
- List of the top supercomputers in the United States
