= Hyperscale computing =

Ability to seamlessly add computer resources to a given node

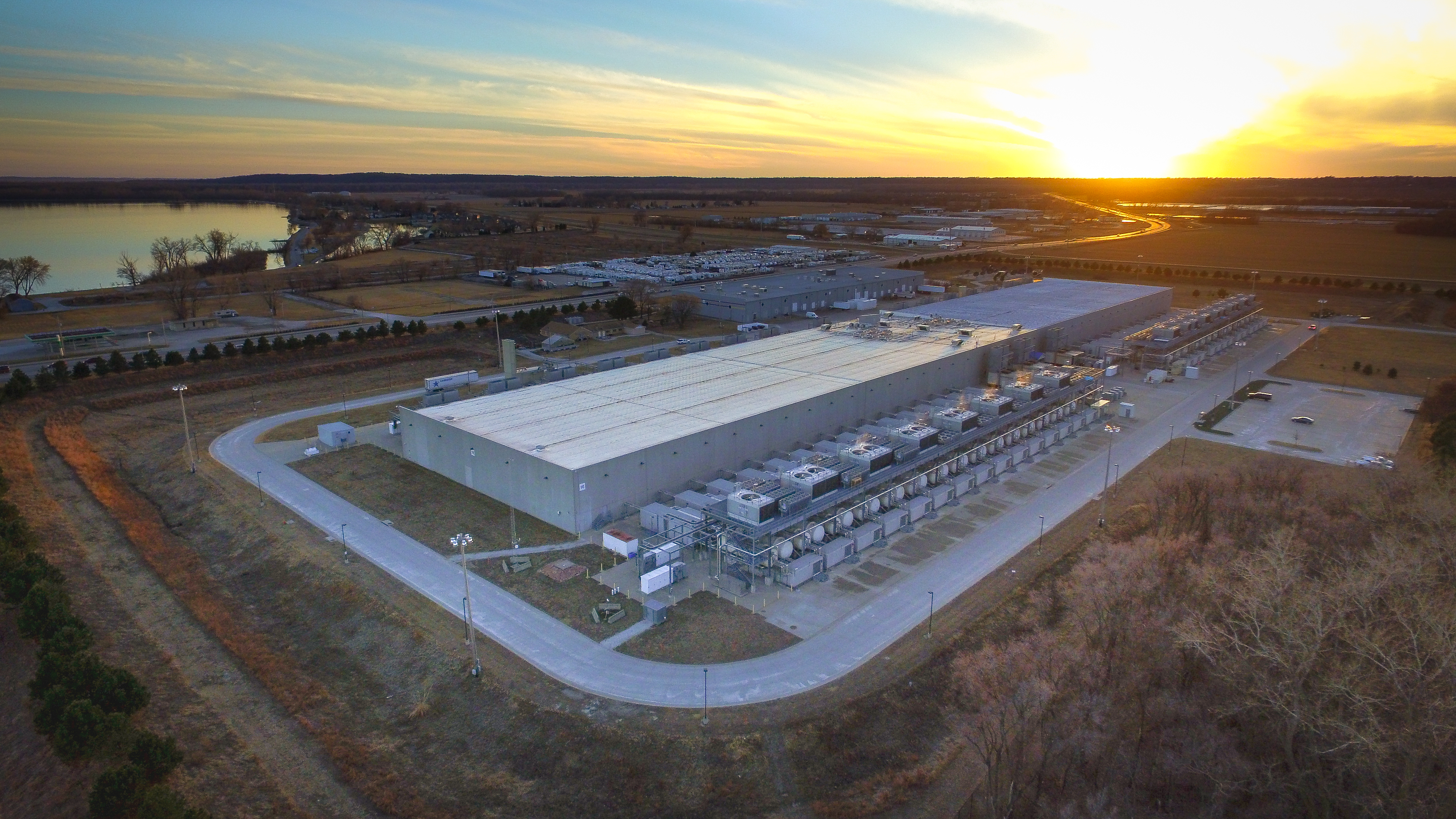
Google data center in Council Bluffs, Iowa

In computing, hyperscale is the ability of an architecture to scale appropriately as increased demand is added to the system.

This typically involves the ability to seamlessly provide and add computing, memory, networking, and storage resources to a given node or set of nodes that make up a larger computing, distributed computing, or grid computing environment. Hyperscale computing is necessary in order to build a robust and scalable cloud, big data, map reduce, or distributed storage system and is often associated with the infrastructure required to run large distributed sites, such as Google, Meta, AWS, and Microsoft.

Companies like Ericsson, AMD, and Intel provide hyperscale infrastructure kits for IT service providers.

Companies like Scaleway, Switch, Alibaba, IBM, QTS, Neysa, Digital Realty Trust, Equinix, Oracle, Meta, Amazon Web Services, SAP, Microsoft, Google, and Cloudflare build data centers for hyperscale computing. Such companies are sometimes called "hyperscalers". They are recognized for their massive scale in cloud computing and data management, operating in environments that require extensive infrastructure to accommodate large-scale data processing and storage.

== See also ==
- Software-defined networking
- Software-defined storage
