= And You Were Wonderful, On Stage =

- Directed by: Cally Spooner
- Written by: Cally Spooner
- Produced by: Edd Hobbs
- Starring: Rhiannon Drake; Jenny Minton; Piya Malik; Rebecca Thorn; Chloë Turpin
- Edited by: Cally Spooner
- Music by: Peter Joslyn
- Production companies: EMPAC; Stedelijk Museum
- Release date: January 15, 2016 (Netherlands)
- Running time: 46 minutes
- Language: English

And You Were Wonderful, On Stage is a 2016 musical film written and directed by Cally Spooner and starring Rhiannon Drake, Jenny Minton, Piya Malik, Rebecca Thorn and Chloë Turpin. The film is based on the performance artwork of the same name, which toured internationally from 2013-15. It premiered at the Stedelijk Museum on 15 January 2016. The piece is delivered by a chorus line of women, who gossip about celebrities and the media, with text based on notes from a meeting of an advertising agency.

== Background ==
In Spring 2013, Stedelijk Museum produced the peripatetic musical And You Were Wonderful, On Stage, co-produced by Performa 13 and Tate Modern. The performance artwork was delivered by a chorus line of 26 women, who gossiped about fallen celebrities from music, politics and sport. The cast went on to tour to various locations across the world. These included:

Date	Location
March 2013	Camberwell Space, London
April 2013	Stedelijk Museum, Amsterdam
July 2013	KW Institute, Berlin
September 2013	Arnolfini, Bristol
October 2013	Wysing Arts Centre, Cambridgeshire
November 2013	Performa '13, New York
January 2014	Tate Britain, London

== Plot ==
Delivered by a chorus line of women, the film gossips about various celebrities, athletes and politicians who have outsourced their performances to different technologies. Examples include when Beyoncé used lip-syncing during the presidential inauguration, when Lance Armstrong apologised to Oprah for his use of doping, and when famous speechwriter Jon Favreau left the White House to pursue a career as a Hollywood scriptwriter. The chorus’ libretto is based on meeting notes from an advertising agency, which discussed how to take disclosed personal stories and ambitions from employees and refashion them to show a better voice of their corporation as TV-commercials. The film also includes comments on popular public figures such as Justin Bieber, Michael Gove and many more.

== Cast ==
Main cast:

- Rhiannon Drake as Singer
- Jenny Minton as Singer
- Piya Malik as Singer
- Rebecca Thorn as Singer
- Chloë Turpin as Singer

Supporting Cast:

- Hai-Ting as Opera Singer
- Logan Kruger as Dancer
- Kristen Foote as Dancer
- Caroline Fermin as Dancer

== Production ==
In 2013 writer and director Cally Spooner was nominated for a Paul Hamlyn Foundation Award, which she went on to win. This secured her £50,000 to fund her artwork, giving Spooner "the resources and breathing space to begin." In 2014 she received further funding from Arts Council England, who gave £15,000 towards the production. Edd Hobbs was invited to produce, with choreography by Adam Weiner, costumes by Malene List Thomsen and set design by Giles Round. A trailer entitled He's in a Great Place! was broadcast worldwide live via the Tate Modern website on 27 February 2014. In 2015 it was announced that Rhiannon Drake, Jenny Minton, Piya Malik, Rebecca Thorn and Chloë Turpin would be returning from the chorus of 26 that toured.

Filming took place in Studio 1 at the Experimental Media and Performing Arts Centre, New York, in February 2015. The final evening of filming was broadcast live via the EMPAC website, with a live studio audience.

From April to June 2015, Spooner held an exhibition entitled Post-Production at Spike Island, Bristol, where she used the studio as a testing site, asking what should and should not be removed or edited.

== Release ==
Although different elements of the film had been shown at various film and art festivals for over a year preceding the release, the full-length film premiered on 15 January 2016 at the Stedelijk Museum, Netherlands. The film received positive reviews, causing the exhibition to be extended by a month. As of September 2016, no further screenings have taken place.
