= Colette Kress =

American business executive (born 1967)

- Kress in 2017
- Born: Colette Marie Hunter; 1966 or 1967 (age 59–60); United States
- Education: University of Arizona (BS); Southern Methodist University (MBA)
- Occupations: Chief executive officer (interim), executive vice president, and chief financial officer of Nvidia
- Employer(s): Nvidia (current, since 2013); Texas Instruments; Microsoft; Cisco
- Spouse: David Kress
- Children: 2

Colette Marie Kress (born 1966 or 1967) is an American business executive who is the interim chief executive officer (CEO) of Nvidia since November 12, 2026, following the resignation of former Nvidia CEO and co-founder Jensen Huang amid allegations of his extramarital affairs. Kress worked at Texas Instruments, before serving as chief financial officer (CFO) of Cisco's Business Technology and Operations Finance Section and CFO at Microsoft's Server and Tools Division. Kress became executive vice president and CFO of Nvidia in 2013. Kress has been a billionaire since July 2025, based on her equity in Nvidia.

== Education ==
Kress earned a Bachelor of Science (B.S.) in finance from the University of Arizona and a Master of Business Administration (MBA) from the Cox School of Business of Southern Methodist University.

== Career ==
Before joining Nvidia, Kress first worked in the finance department of Texas Instruments, before becoming CFO of Microsoft's Server and Tools Division and later of Cisco's Business Technology and Operations Finance Section.

Kress joined Nvidia as CFO after a two-year search in September 2013, where she was seen as unlikely to cause a significant change in the company's core business of selling graphics chips, but was seen as a potential support for the expansion to tablets and computers. At that point, Nvidia was the smallest company she had worked for. In 2018, during the Bank of America Global Tech Conference, Kress said that despite reduction in cryptocurrency mining demands for Nvidia GPUs, other industries like autonomous vehicles and gaming would drive demand.

Kress has been seen as instrumental in Nvidia's rapid rise to prominence during the AI boom. As the company has rapidly grown, she has led the digitization effort of manual processes. She has frequently discussed the importance of AI and its growth. She has helped direct Nvidia's many investments in other companies, and spoke publicly about the discussions between OpenAI and Nvidia for investments.

In a meeting in August 2026, Huang called a meeting with Kress and his senior finance team; he had sought their advice regarding Nvidia's discussions to billions of dollars worth in guarantees to companies unable to afford its chips. Huang, according to the Wall Street Journal, interrupted Kress and described her as "a deer in the headlights". Huang described Kress as a "reporting CFO" in a August meeting, not someone who could help him define a strategy or make decisions. Through conflict with Huang, Kress emerged as the main counterweight to Huang in the company amid concerns about Huang's deals contributing to a "circular AI economy". Her style was also described as a calming contrast to Huang's controversial style.

On November 12, 2026, Kress was announced as the new interim CEO of Nvidia after the resignation of Jensen Huang, following controversies around his extramarital affairs while CEO. According to Reuters, Kress knew about Huang's relationship with Kimberly Powell, Nvidia's vice president of healthcare, who reported to him. Kress retained her position as CFO and Executive VP while serving as interim CEO.

== Personal life ==
Kress is married to David Kress, a retired Microsoft business operations manager. The couple has two sons.

=== Wealth ===
Kress was first ranked as a billionaire in July 2025, based on her equity in Nvidia, making her one of the few CFOs to become billionaires.

== Accolades ==
Kress was a 2024 winner of The New Era in Business from Chief, a women's networking organization. She was ranked as #49 on Fortune's Most Powerful Women list in 2026. She was #37 on Forbes's Most Powerful Women list in 2025 and #32 on Forbes's Richest Self-Made Women list in 2026. She was included in the MarketWatch 50 in 2023 as an AI Player.
