= Lindsay Kaplan =

Co-founder of Chief

- Occupations: Entrepreneur, investor
- Organization: Chief

Lindsay Kaplan is an American entrepreneur, investor and the co-founder of Chief, a network for senior executive women. Under Kaplan's leadership, Chief became one of the fastest women-founded startups to achieve unicorn status, reaching a valuation exceeding $1 billion in 2022.

== Career ==
Kaplan began her career in publishing with roles at Oxford University Press, Time Out New York, and ELLE. She later joined Casper as its first full-time employee, serving as Vice President of Communications and Brand Marketing. Kaplan was recognized as one of the Most Innovative CMOs by Business Insider during her tenure at Casper.

In 2022, Kaplan and her co-founder, Carolyn Childers, raised $100 million, increasing Chief's total funding to $140 million and reaching a $1 billion valuation, making it one of the fastest women-founded companies to achieve unicorn status.

Kaplan has spoken about the state of women business, entrepreneurship, and marketing at global conferences including Web Summit, TechCrunch Disrupt, and the Fast Company Innovation Festival. She is an Executive Member of The International Academy of Digital Arts and Sciences and serves as an executive judge for the Webby Awards.

== Recognition ==
As Co-Founder and Chief Brand Officer at Chief, Kaplan has been recognized with several honors, including being named an AdAge Leading Woman, included in Crain's 40 Under 40, and recognized as one of Inc. Magazine's Most Dynamic Female Founders.

== Investments ==
Kaplan is an angel investor and startup advisor. In 2024, she joined the venture capital fund Next Wave NYC as an investing partner focusing on early-stage AI startups. In 2026, Kaplan joined VC firm Bullish as a venture partner, investing in early-stage consumer companies.
