= Malachowsky Hall for Data Science & Information Technology =

Building in Gainesville, Florida

Coordinates: 29.6449°N 82.3480°W

- Malachowsky Hall
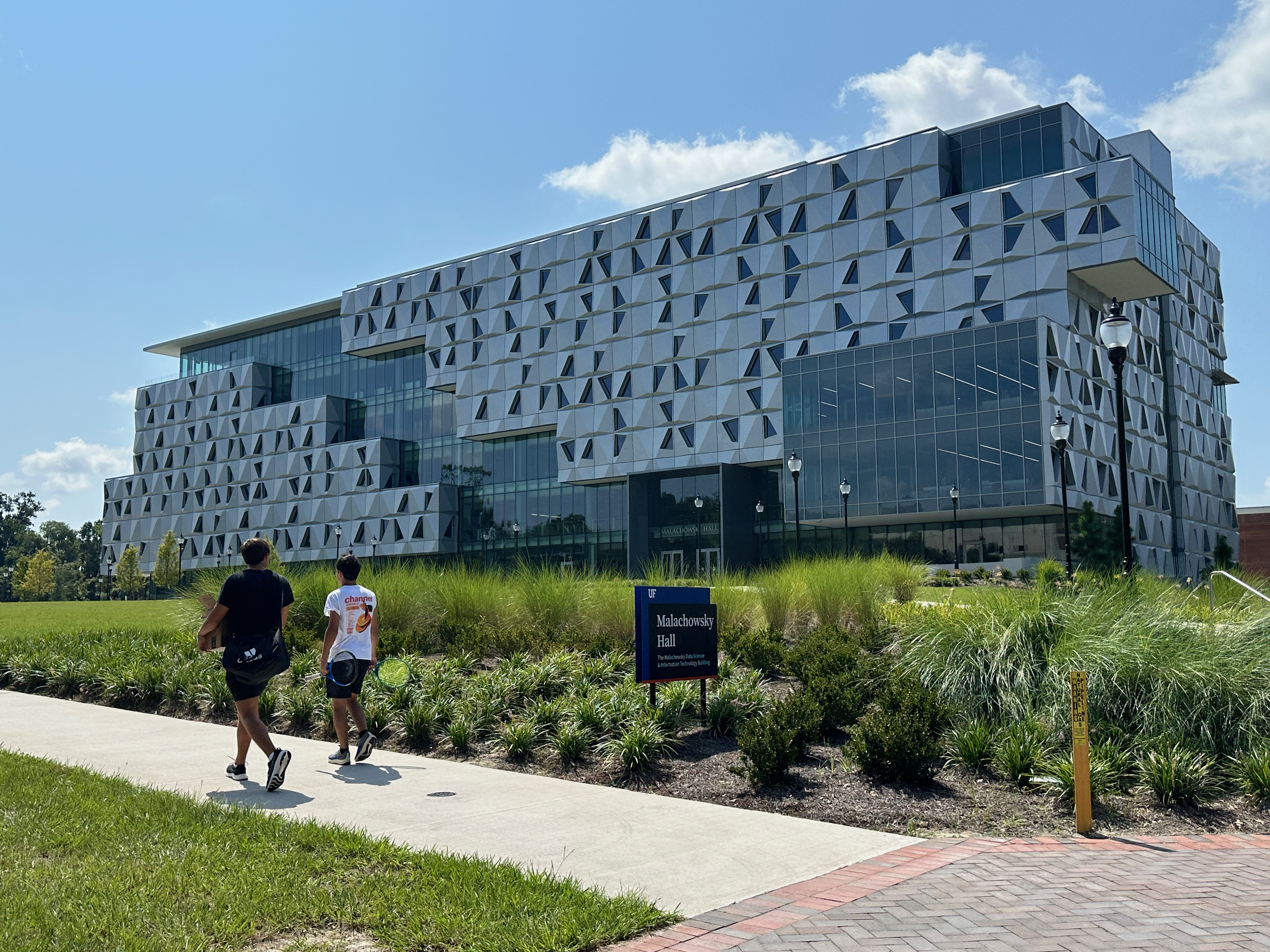

General information
- Type: Educational
- Location: Gainesville, Florida, United States
- Construction started: 2020
- Completed: 2023
- Opened: 2023
- Cost: $150 million
- Client: University of Florida Board of Trustees

Design and construction
- Architecture firm: Bohlin Cywinski Jackson; Walker Architects
- Structural engineer: Walter P Moore
- Main contractor: Ajax Building Company

The Malachowsky Hall for Data Science & Information Technology, or simply Malachowsky Hall, is a building on the University of Florida (UF) campus in Gainesville, Florida. Named after UF alumnus and Nvidia co-founder Chris Malachowsky, the building began construction in 2020 and opened in November 2023.

It houses spaces for several of the university's colleges and departments including the College of Engineering, the College of Pharmacy, and College of Medicine, as well as the Informatics Institute, part of UF Research.

== History ==
=== Conception and construction ===
Malachowsky Hall came about as the university was undergoing major construction and renovation projects in the late-to-mid 2010s and early 2020s. In 2016, university officials introduced their "Strategic Development Plan", a "set of guiding documents that outlined how the university and the community would grow together over the next 50 years". This plan's success led university officials to group their collection of plans into the "Strategic Campus Master Plan".

Chris Malachowsky, the building's namesake is an alumnus of the university and after graduating, became a co-founder of Nvidia. A gift from Malachowsky, as well as state funding, helped anchor the cost for the building. The initial building's project budget was $150 million. The state provided $110 million of the budget, with the remainder coming from private and college funds. Malachowsky collaborated with architects to design the building's façade. The building was also announced during the university's initial endeavors to integrate artificial intelligence (AI) into curriculum. Nvidia is a key partner of UF in the AI space; in 2020, Malachowsky and the company gifted the university $60 million to fund HiPerGator, an AI supercomputer.

The building's architecture was designed by Bohlin Cywinski Jackson, with the practice working closely with Ajax Building Company, structural engineer Walter P Moore, and N-RG Cladding, among others. Construction on Malachowsky Hall began in December 2020, though work on the panelized metal façade system occurred earlier that August. Malachowsky has a unique look compared to other UF buildings, as its "metal paneled exterior differs from the rest of campus, containing none of the signature orange brick present in older buildings." Indeed, the building features "origamilike creases [which] provide for some very idiosyncratic window shapes." The design team "opted for a relatively straightforward cast-in-place flat slab concrete structural system". The building also has 1,500 panels with electrochromatic glazing sitting within them. N-RG Cladding credited ELRO Manufacturing, KENPAT, and Architectural Glass Services as partners in the construction. In September 2022, pipe conditions on campus were reported to have delayed construction.

=== Opening ===
Located across Museum Road from the Reitz Union, the building was originally scheduled to open in March 2023, though this was pushed back to April 2023. The 263,440-square foot building officially opened on November 3, 2023. The building's opening was commemorated through a livestreamed fireside chat event; Malachowsky and fellow Nvidia co-founder Jensen Huang, as well as then UF President Ben Sasse, student leaders of various engineering student organizations, and others of the Gainesville community were among those present. Forrest Masters, the interim Dean of the Herbert Wertheim College of Engineering, moderated the event. Despite this grand opening event, the building was not yet completed at the time, with students locked out when attempting to access the building and the sixth and seventh floors still under construction. The building is scheduled to be accessible for general students and faculty in the spring 2024 semester.

A seven-story building, Malachowsky Hall is intended to serve as a multidisciplinary hub for STEM fields, particularly those relating to data science, information technology, and AI. Electrical and computer engineering departments, as well as spaces for medicine and pharmacy are also housed in the building. Malachowsky Hall also houses the coordinating center for the OneFlorida Clinical Research Consortium. After the passing of the CHIPS and Science Act, leaders at UF launched the Florida Semiconductor Institute to facilitate chip research domestically. The Institute is housed at Malachowsky Hall.

== See also ==
- List of University of Florida buildings
