= Huang's law =

Computer science observation

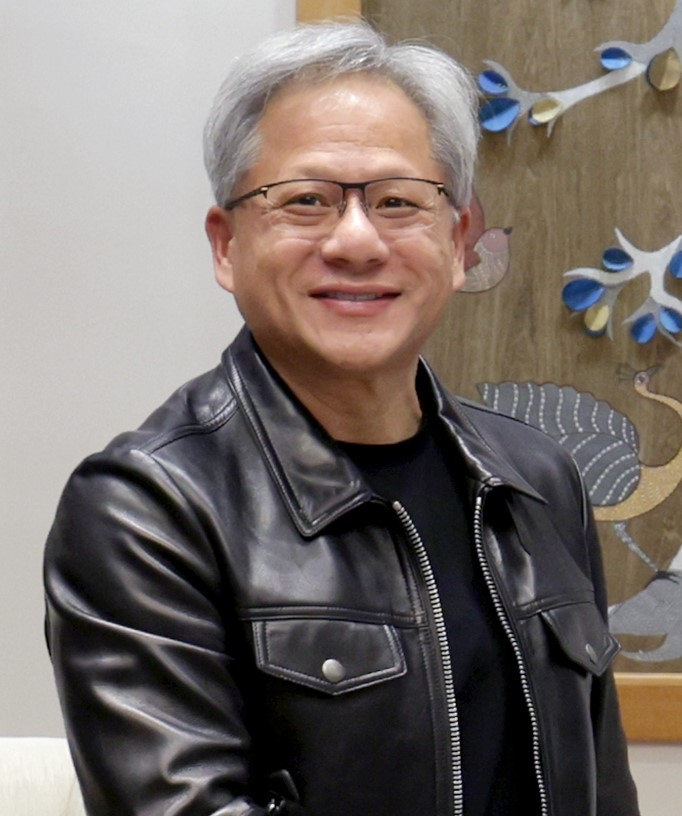
Jensen Huang, former CEO of Nvidia and the law's namesake, in 2023

Huang's law is the observation in computer science and engineering that advancements in graphics processing units (GPUs) are growing at a rate much faster than with traditional central processing units (CPUs). The observation is in contrast to Moore's law that predicted the number of transistors in a dense integrated circuit (IC) doubles about every two years. Huang's law states that the performance of GPUs will more than double every two years. The hypothesis is subject to questions about its validity.

== History ==
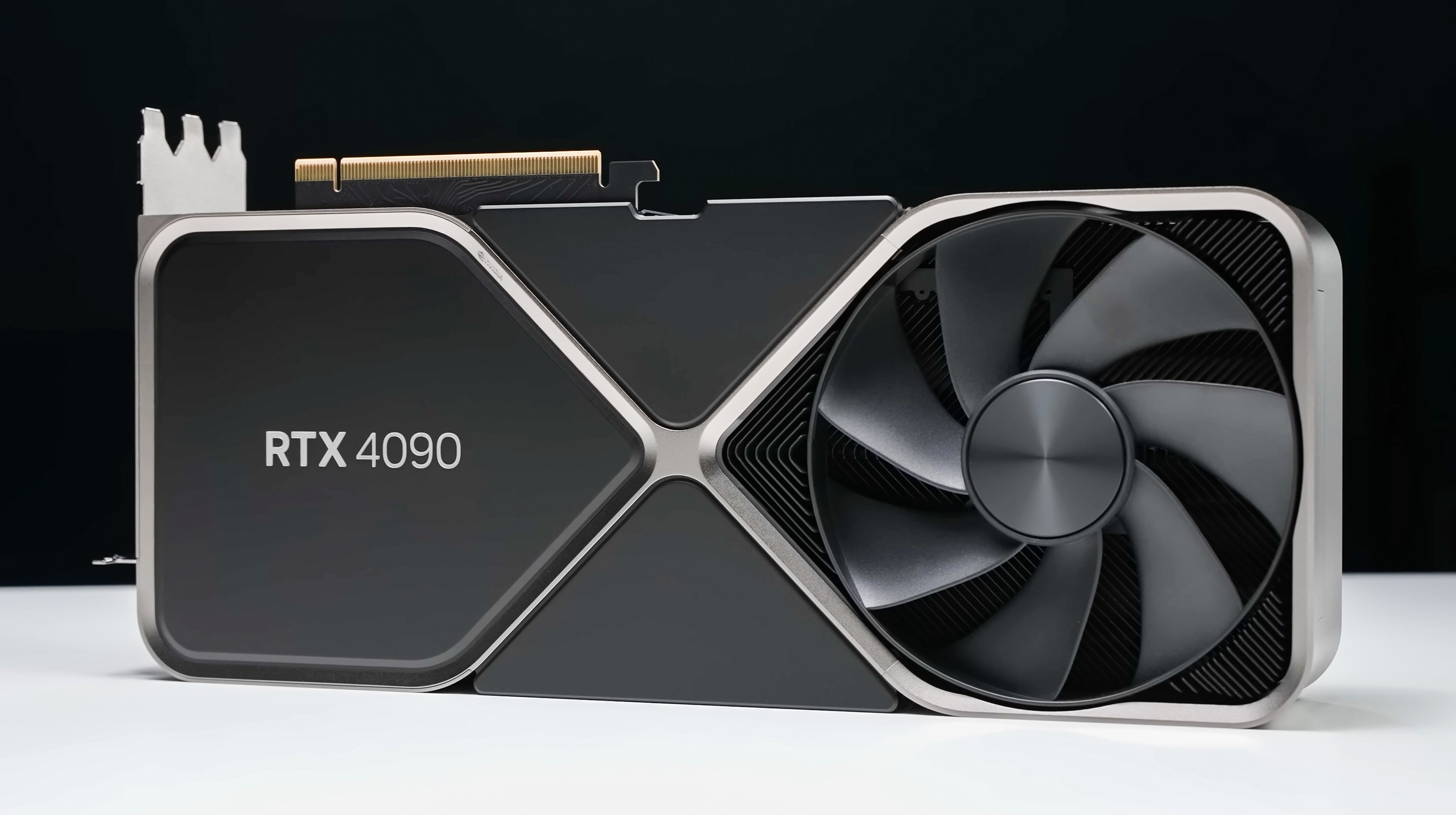
An RTX 4090 from 2022, the flagship card in Nvidia's GeForce 40 series, with 82.58 TFLOPS at single precision computing (FP32) …

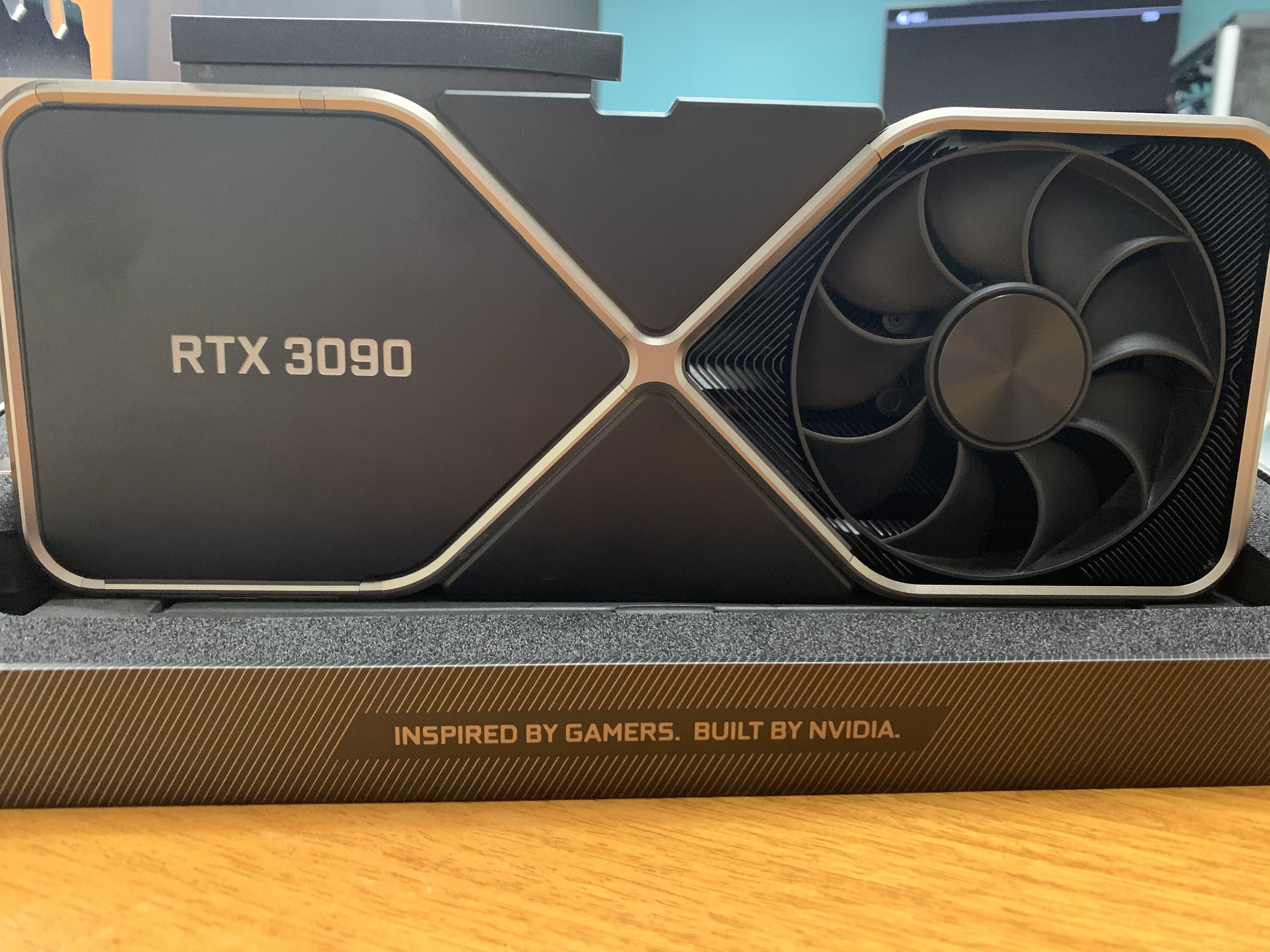
… and its predecessor from 2020, the RTX 3090 with 35.58 TFLOPS (FP32), showing a massive leap in raw performance in just one generation

The observation was made by Jensen Huang, then chief executive officer of Nvidia, at its 2018 GPU Technology Conference (GTC) held in San Jose, California. He observed that Nvidia's GPUs were "25 times faster than five years ago" whereas Moore's law would have expected only a ten-fold increase. As microchip components become smaller, it became harder for chip advancement to meet the speed of Moore's law.

In 2006, Nvidia's GPU had a 4x performance advantage over other CPUs. In 2018, the Nvidia GPU was 20 times faster than a comparable CPU node: the GPUs were 1.7x faster each year. Moore's law would predict a doubling every two years; however, Nvidia's GPU performance was more than tripled every two years, fulfilling Huang's law.

Huang's law claims that a synergy between hardware, software, and artificial intelligence makes the new 'law' possible. (Note: Contrary to other reports, it is said that "Huang's Law" ... is a term coined by The Wall Street Journal journalist Christopher Mims.") Huang said, "The innovation isn't just about chips," he said, "It's about the entire stack." He said that graphics processors especially are important to a new paradigm. Elimination of bottlenecks can speed up the process and create advantages in getting to the goal. "Nvidia is a one-trick pony," Huang has said.

According to Huang: "Accelerated computing is liberating, ... Let's say you have an airplane that has to deliver a package. It takes 12 hours to deliver it. Instead of making the plane go faster, concentrate on how to deliver the package faster, look at 3D printing at the destination." The object "... is to deliver the goal faster."

For artificial intelligence tasks, Huang said that training the convolutional network AlexNet took six days on two of Nvidia's GTX 580 processors to complete the training process but only 18 minutes on a modern DGX-2 GPU server, resulting in a speed-up factor of 500. Compared to Moore's law, which focuses purely on CPU transistors, Huang's law describes a combination of advances in architecture, interconnects, memory technology, and algorithms.

== Reception ==
Bharath Ramsundar wrote that deep learning is being coupled with "improvements in custom architecture". For example, machine learning systems have been implemented in the blockchain world, where Bitmain assaulted "many cryptocurrencies by designing custom mining ASICs (application-specific integrated circuits)" which had been envisioned as undoable. "Nvidia's grand achievement however is in making the case that these improvement in architectures are not merely isolated victories for specific applications but perhaps broadly applicable to all of computer science."

They have suggested that broad harnessing of GPUs and the GPU stack (cf., CPU stack) can deliver "dramatic growth in deep learning architecture." "The magic" of Huang's law promise is that as nascent deep learning powered software becomes more availed, the improvements from GPU scaling and more generally from architectural improvements" will concretely improve "performance and behavior of modern software stacks."

There has been criticism. Journalist Joel Hruska writing in ExtremeTech in 2020 said "there is no such thing as Huang's Law", calling it an "illusion" that rests on the gains made possible by Moore's law; and that it is too soon to determine a law exists. The research nonprofit EpochAI has found that, between 2006 and 2021, GPU price performance (in terms of FLOPS/$) has tended to double approximately every 2.5 years, much slower than predicted by Huang's law.

== See also ==
- Accelerating change
- List of eponymous laws
