= Chris Malachowsky =

American electrical engineer (born 1959)

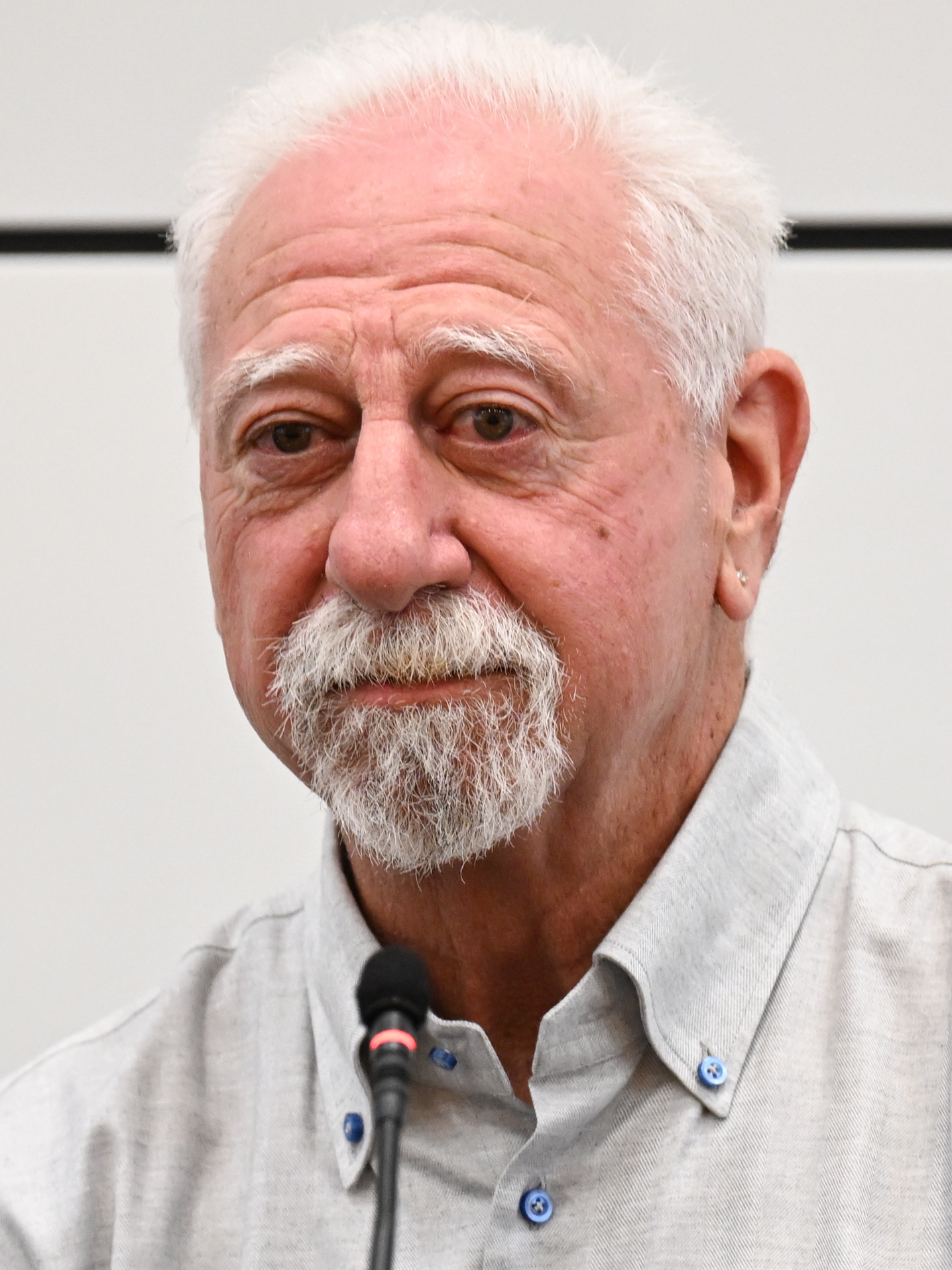
- Malachowsky in 2025
- Born: May 2, 1959 (age 67)
- Education: University of Florida (BS); Santa Clara University (MS)
- Known for: Co-founding Nvidia
- Scientific career
- Fields: Electrical engineering
- Workplaces: Hewlett-Packard; Sun Microsystems; Nvidia

Chris A. Malachowsky (born May 2, 1959) is an American electrical engineer and business executive who is a co-founder, along with Jensen Huang and Curtis Priem, of the American technology company Nvidia. Malachowsky has worked for Nvidia since its founding in 1993 and is a senior vice president for engineering and operations.

== Early life ==
Raised in the Oakhurst section of Ocean Township, Monmouth County, New Jersey, Malachowsky graduated from Ocean Township High School in 1976. He received a B.S. degree in 1983, in electrical engineering from the University of Florida and an M.S. degree in 1986 from Santa Clara University.

== Career ==
Early in his career, Malachowsky worked for Hewlett-Packard and Sun Microsystems. While working at Sun Microsystems, he became coworkers with Jensen Huang and Curtis Priem. In April 1993, the three conceived of Nvidia during a meeting at Denny's. Malachowsky co-founded the company and went on to become its Senior Vice President for Engineering and Operations.

=== Malachowsky Hall ===
In November 2023, the Malachowsky Hall for Data Science & Information Technology was officially opened at the University of Florida. Malachowsky invested $25 million in the creation of HiPerGator AI, which UF claimed to be "the fastest supercomputer owned and operated by a university in the U.S."

== Honors ==
- 2008 Distinguished Alumni Award from Santa Clara University
- 2017 Distinguished Alumni Award from the University of Florida College of Engineering in 2017
- 2019 Florida Inventors Hall of Fame
- 2024 Ocean Township High School Hall of Fame Induction
- 2026 IEEE Robert N. Noyce Medal
