= Jensen Huang =

Taiwanese-American businessman (born 1963)

- 黃仁勳
- Huang in 2026
- Born: Jen-Hsun Huang; February 17, 1963 (age 63); Taipei, Taiwan
- Citizenship: Taiwan; United States
- Education: Oregon State University (BS); Stanford University (MS)
- Known for: Co-founding Nvidia
- Title: President and CEO of Nvidia Corporation (1993–2026)
- Successor: Colette Kress (interim)
- Spouse: Lori Mills (m. 1985)
- Children: 2
- Relatives: Lisa Su (cousin)
- Awards: IEEE Founders Medal (2020); VinFuture Prize (2024); Edison Award (2024); Primetime Engineering Award (2024); Queen Elizabeth Prize for Engineering (2025); IEEE Medal of Honor (2026); National Medal of Science (2026)

Chinese name
- Traditional Chinese: 黃仁勳
- Simplified Chinese: 黄仁勋
Transcriptions
Standard Mandarin
- Hanyu Pinyin: Huáng Rénxūn
- Bopomofo: ㄏㄨㄤˊ ㄖㄣˊ ㄒㄩㄣˉ
- Gwoyeu Romatzyh: Hwang Ren-shiun
- Wade–Giles: Huang^{2} Jên^{2}-hsün^{1}
- Tongyong Pinyin: Huáng Rén-syūn
- Yale Romanization: Hwáng Rén-syūn
- MPS2: Huáng Rén-shiūn
- IPA: [xwǎŋ ɻə̌n.ɕýn]
Yue: Cantonese
- Jyutping: Wong4 Jan4-fan1
Southern Min
- Hokkien POJ: N̂g Jîn-hun
- Tâi-lô: N̂g Jîn-hun

Jen-Hsun "Jensen" Huang (Note: Chinese: 黃仁勳; pinyin: Huáng Rénxūn; Wade–Giles: Huang² Jên²-hsün¹; Tâi-lô: N̂g Jîn-hun) (born February 17, 1963) is a Taiwanese and American electrical engineer and businessman. He co-founded the technology company Nvidia, one of the world's most valuable corporations, and served as its president and CEO from its founding in 1993 until his resignation in 2026. As of November 2026, Forbes estimates his net worth at US$110.1 billion, making him the 18th-wealthiest person in the world.

Born in Taipei, Huang spent his childhood in Taiwan and Thailand before immigrating to the United States. After earning a master's degree from Stanford University, he launched Nvidia alongside Chris Malachowsky and Curtis Priem from a Denny's restaurant in San Jose, California, in 1993. Huang led the company out of near-bankruptcy during the 1990s and oversaw its expansion from graphics processing unit (GPU) development into high-performance computing and artificial intelligence (AI).

Under Huang's leadership, Nvidia experienced massive growth during the AI boom, becoming the first company to reach a market capitalization of more than $5 trillion in October 2025. In 2021 and 2024, Time magazine included him in its list of the most influential people, and later named him as one of the "Architects of AI" for its 2025 Person of the Year. He was also awarded the IEEE Medal of Honor and the National Medal of Science in 2026 for his contributions to machine learning and computational science.

In November 2026, it was reported that Huang had multiple extramarital affairs, including one with Chinese business executive Alice Huang. (Note: No relation) The U.S. government initially suspected that she may have been a spy for China; later reporting disputed that there was conclusive evidence of this. As a result, Huang resigned from his positions at Nvidia, and the company confirmed that he would have no formal role at the firm going forward.

== Early life and education ==
Huang was born in Taipei, Taiwan, on February 17, 1963, and moved to the southern city of Tainan as a child. He is the second son of Huang Hsing-tai, (Note: Chinese name: 黃興泰) a chemical engineer at an oil refinery, and Lo Tsai-hsiu, (Note: Chinese name: 羅采秀) a schoolteacher. They were a middle-class Taiwanese family that relocated often, and were native speakers of Taiwanese Hokkien. Each day, Jensen's mother randomly selected 10 words from the dictionary to teach her sons English. When he was five years old, Huang's family moved to Thailand to support his father's refinery career and remained there for approximately four years. He attended Ruamrudee International School while in Bangkok.

In the late 1960s, Hsing-tai traveled from Taiwan to New York City to train under an air conditioning company and, after returning home, resolved to send his sons to the United States. When he was nine years old, Jensen's parents sent him to live in the United States, even though he did not yet speak English fluently. He and his older brother moved in 1973 to live with an uncle in Tacoma, Washington. Both Huang's aunt and uncle were recent immigrants to Washington state; they accidentally enrolled him and his brother in the Oneida Baptist Institute, a religious reform academy in Oneida, Kentucky, for troubled youth, mistakenly believing it to be a prestigious boarding school. In order to afford the academy's tuition, Jensen's parents sold nearly all their possessions.

At the age of 10, Huang lived with his older brother in the boys' dormitory at Oneida Institute. Because he was too young to attend classes there, Huang enrolled at Oneida Elementary School, a public school in town, arriving as "an undersized Asian immigrant with long hair and heavily accented English". He was frequently bullied and beaten by classmates. In Oneida, Huang cleaned toilets every day, learned to play table tennis, (Note: According to Forbes, Huang "placed third in junior doubles at the U.S. Table Tennis Open championship, at age 15" in 1978.) joined a swimming team, and appeared in Sports Illustrated at age 14. He taught his roommate how to read in exchange for being taught how to bench press. In 2002, Huang said he remembered the part of his life in Kentucky "more vividly than just about any other".

Two years after Huang arrived in Oneida, his parents moved to the United States and settled in Beaverton, Oregon, after which the brothers withdrew from school in Kentucky to live with them. As a teenager, Huang attended Aloha High School in Aloha, Oregon, where he excelled academically. He skipped two grades, graduated at age 16, and became a nationally ranked table-tennis player, in addition to being a member of its mathematics, computer, and science clubs. In 1977, the school purchased an Apple II computer which Huang used to play Super Star Trek, a text-based video game, and to program in BASIC, creating his own version of Snake.

At the age of 15, Huang's first job was working the graveyard shift at a local Denny's restaurant as a dishwasher, busboy, and waiter from 1978 to 1983. After high school, he enrolled at Oregon State University because of its engineering program and affordable in-state tuition. He studied electrical engineering and graduated in 1984 with a bachelor's degree with highest honors. Huang later recalled, "I was the youngest kid in school, in class" and the only student who "looked like a child". While working as a microchip designer in Silicon Valley, he took graduate classes at Stanford University, where he earned a master's degree in electrical engineering in 1992.

== AMD and LSI Logic ==
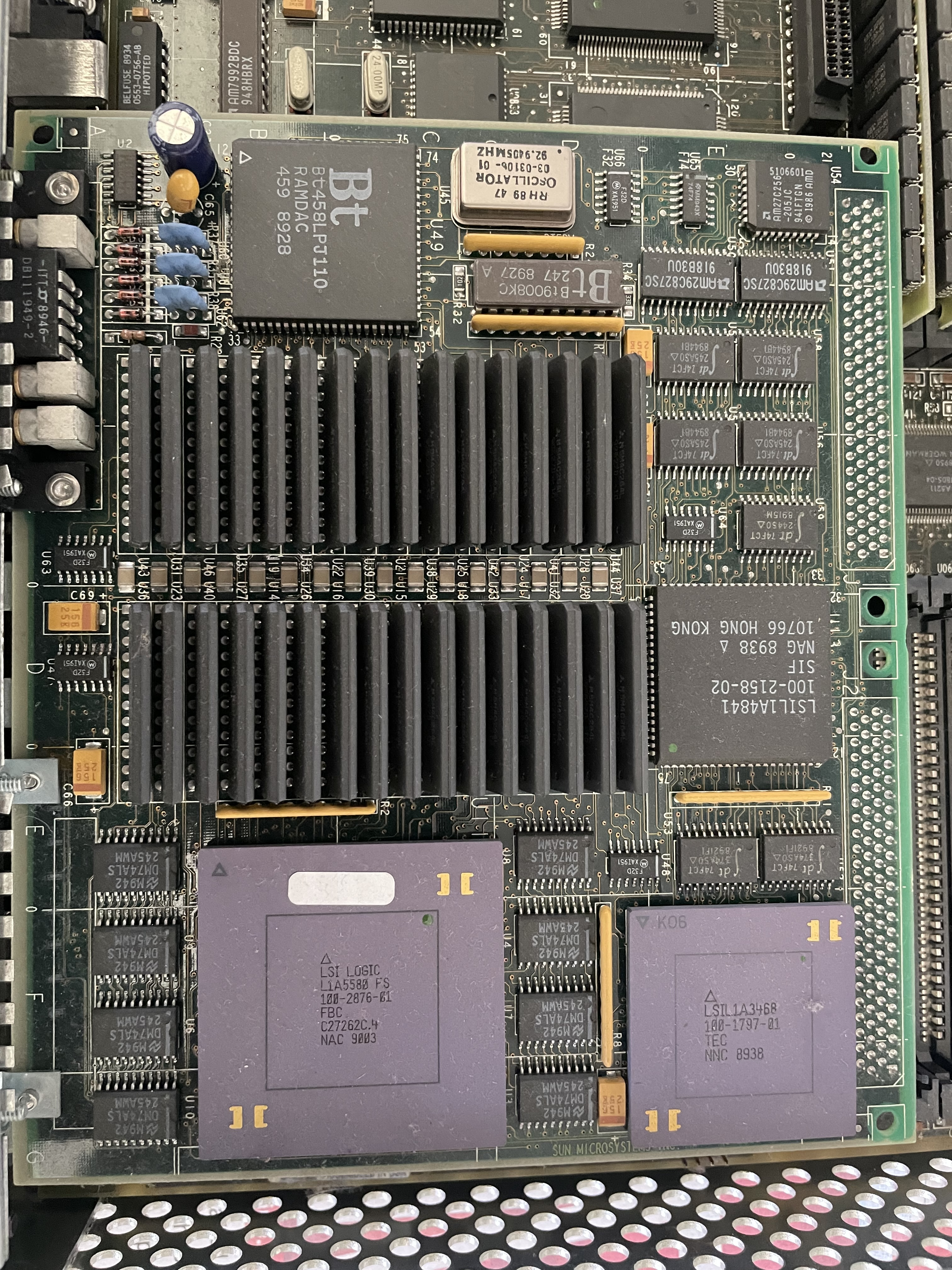
A Sun GX version 1. Note the two large LSI Logic chips implementing the accelerator.

After college, Huang worked as a microchip designer in Silicon Valley. He was approached for positions at Texas Instruments, Advanced Micro Devices (AMD), and LSI Logic, ultimately choosing the California-based AMD due to already being familiar with the company. From 1984 to 1985, Huang designed AMD microprocessors while simultaneously attending Stanford and raising his two children. However, when he heard of new chip design processes at LSI Logic, Huang left AMD to assume a role as a technical officer at LSI Logic, working under a startup company, Sun Microsystems, where he met engineers Chris Malachowsky and Curtis Priem.

LSI was in contract with Sun Microsystems and had introduced Huang to Malachowsky and Priem, who were working on a new graphics accelerator card. While the three produced the card's manufacturing process, the relationship between Malachowsky and Priem became strained as the two disputed the chip's design, leading to infighting; according to Malachowsky, they "broke every tool that LSI Logic had in their standard portfolio".

In 1989, Huang, Malachowsky, and Priem finalized the accelerator, which they called the "GX graphics engine". GX was a widespread financial success; the sales of the graphics engine contributed to Sun Microsystems' revenue increasing from $262 million in 1987 to $656 million in 1990, and Huang was promoted to be the director of LSI's CoreWare, a division that manufactured chips for hardware vendors. He stayed at LSI until 1993.

== Nvidia ==
=== Founding (1993) ===
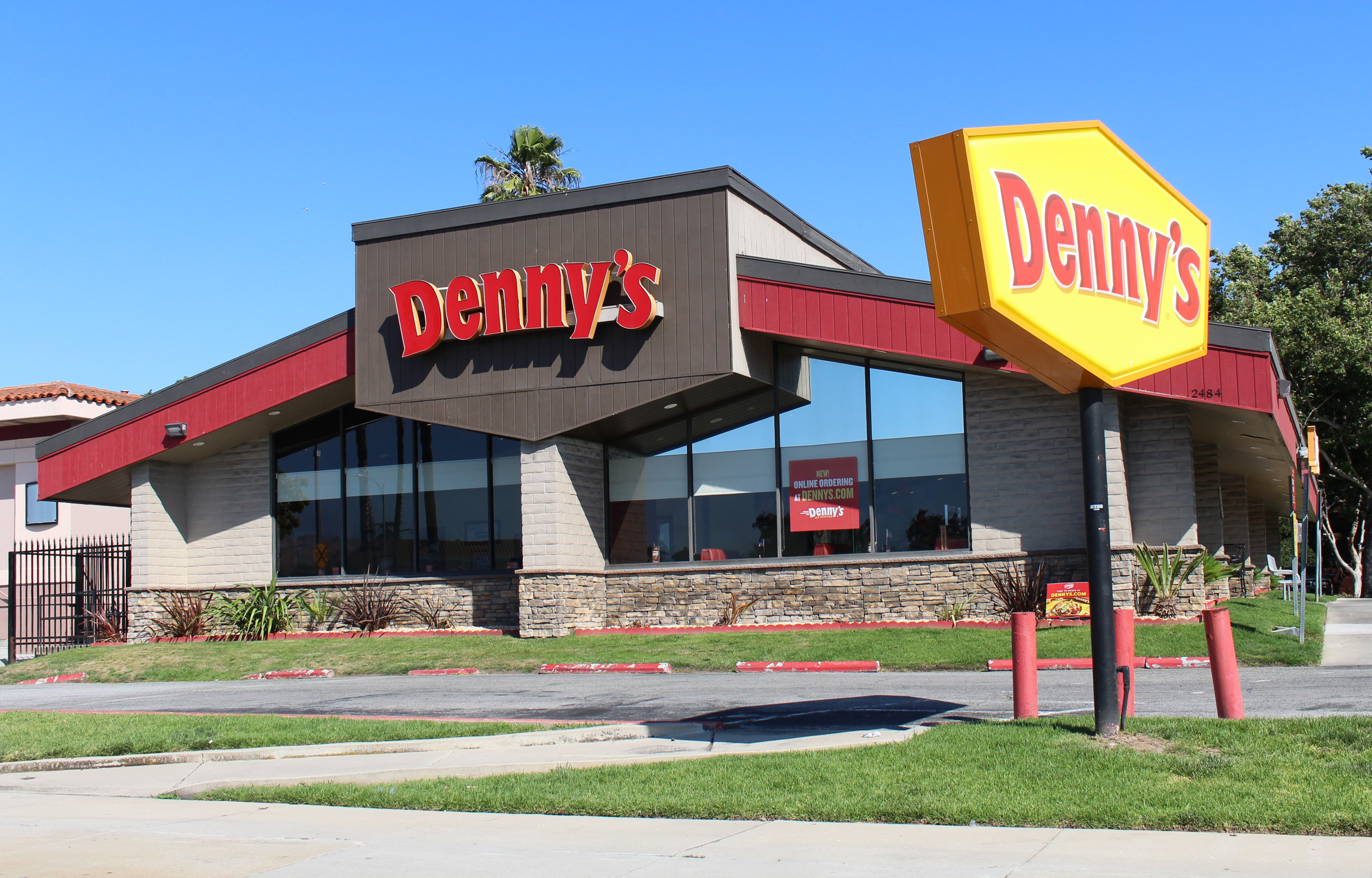
Huang co-founded Nvidia Corporation after meeting with Chris Malachowsky and Curtis Priem in a Denny's diner in East San Jose (pictured). As a teenager, Huang was an employee at a Denny's restaurant in Oregon.

When business began to slow for Sun Microsystems after 1990, Huang, alongside Priem and Malachowsky, resigned to found a venture making graphics chips for PC games. They initially named their new company "NVision" until Huang suggested that the company be named based on the Latin word invidia, as Priem wanted competitors to turn "green with envy". They eventually dropped the "i" to honor the NV1 chip that they were then developing. The three met frequently in 1992 at a Denny's roadside diner in East San Jose to formulate a business plan. Huang chose for them to meet at Denny's due to his prior work experience at the restaurant chain and because it was "quieter than home and had cheap coffee". The three founded the company during one meeting at a breakfast booth at the diner.

To formally incorporate the company, Huang found a lawyer, James Gaither of Cooley Godward, who used $200 of Huang's money to capitalize the company. After that meeting, Huang went back to Priem and Malachowsky to ask each of them for $200 for their respective shares of the company, which meant that Nvidia's initial capital was $600. On April 5, 1993, Huang personally signed Nvidia's original articles of incorporation into effect.

Although he had left LSI, Huang remained in good standing with the company and was able to secure funding for Nvidia from LSI's CEO, Wilfred Corrigan, who introduced Huang to venture capitalist Don Valentine. Valentine, the leader of Sequoia Capital, chose to invest in Nvidia through Corrigan's support, as did Sutter Hill Ventures. The funding enabled Nvidia to begin development efforts toward its first chip and to begin paying wages for its employees. By the first day of operation, Huang was made Nvidia's president and CEO. Even though Huang, at age 30, was younger than Priem and Malachowsky, both Priem and Malachowsky believed that he was prepared to be CEO. According to Priem, "we basically deferred to Jensen on day one" and told Huang, "you're in charge of running the company—all the stuff Chris and I don't know how to do". (Note: In a 2011 interview at Stanford University, Huang recalled that Priem said, "Jensen, you're the CEO, right? Done".)

=== President and CEO (1993–2026) ===
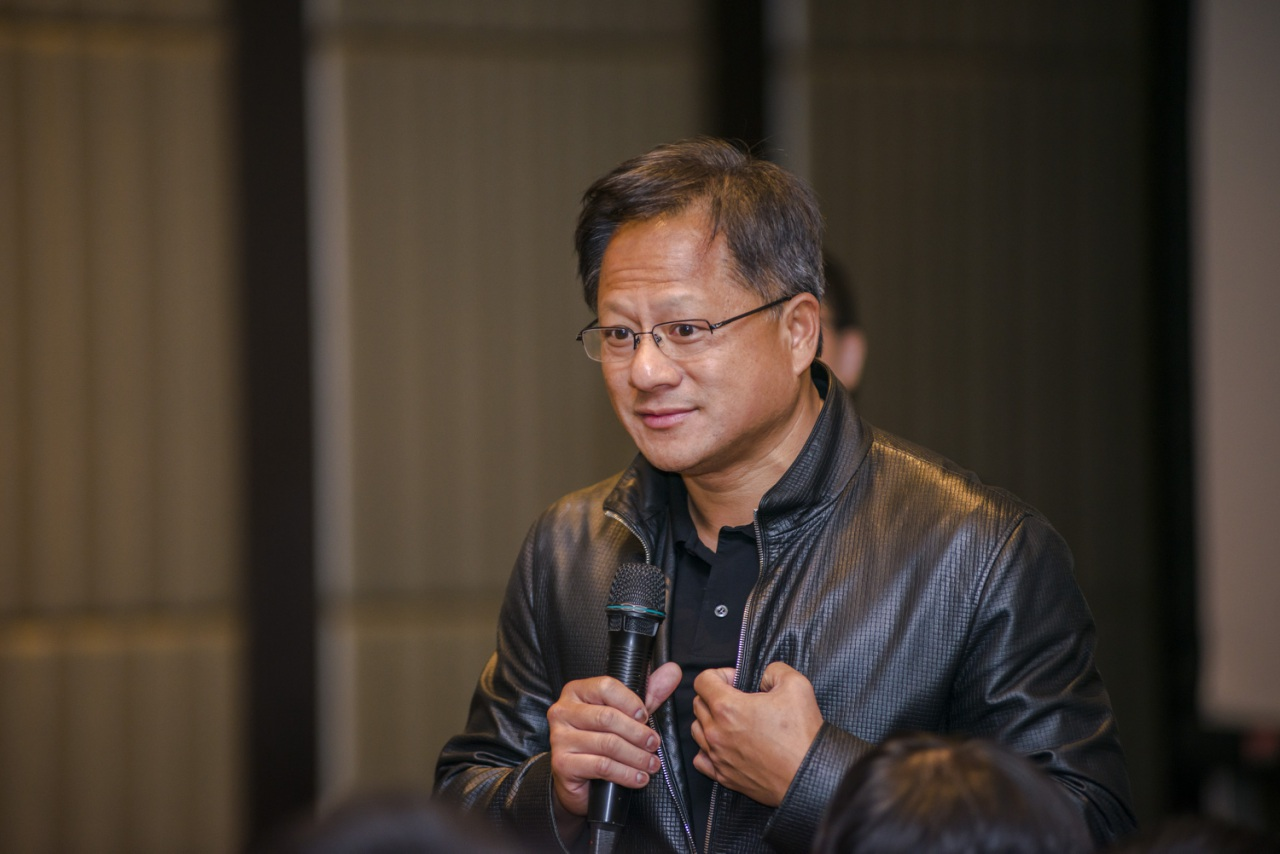
Huang at Computex Taipei in 2016

By 2024, Huang had been Nvidia's chief executive for over three decades, a tenure described by The Wall Street Journal as "almost unheard of in fast-moving Silicon Valley". He owns 3.6% of Nvidia's stock, which went public in 1999. He earned US$24.6 million as CEO in 2007, ranking him as the 61st highest paid U.S. CEO by Forbes. According to Huang, the three co-founders in 1993 had "no idea how" to start a company, "building Nvidia turned out to have been a million times harder" than they expected, and they probably would not have done it if they had realized up front "the pain and suffering [involved] ... the challenges [they were] going to endure, the embarrassment and the shame, and the list of all the things that [would] go wrong."

For its first graphics accelerator chips, Nvidia focused on rendering quadrilateral primitives (forward texture mapping) instead of the triangle primitives preferred by its competitors, and barely survived long enough to successfully pivot to triangles only because Sega agreed to keep Nvidia alive with a $5 million investment. By the time the RIVA 128 was released in August 1997 and saved the company, Nvidia was down to one month of payroll. This resulted in the "unofficial company motto": "Our company is thirty days from going out of business." Huang regularly began presentations to Nvidia staff with those words for many years. However, Huang regards the "pain and suffering" of Nvidia's early years as essential to the company's success in later years, because it forced him to become a better leader.

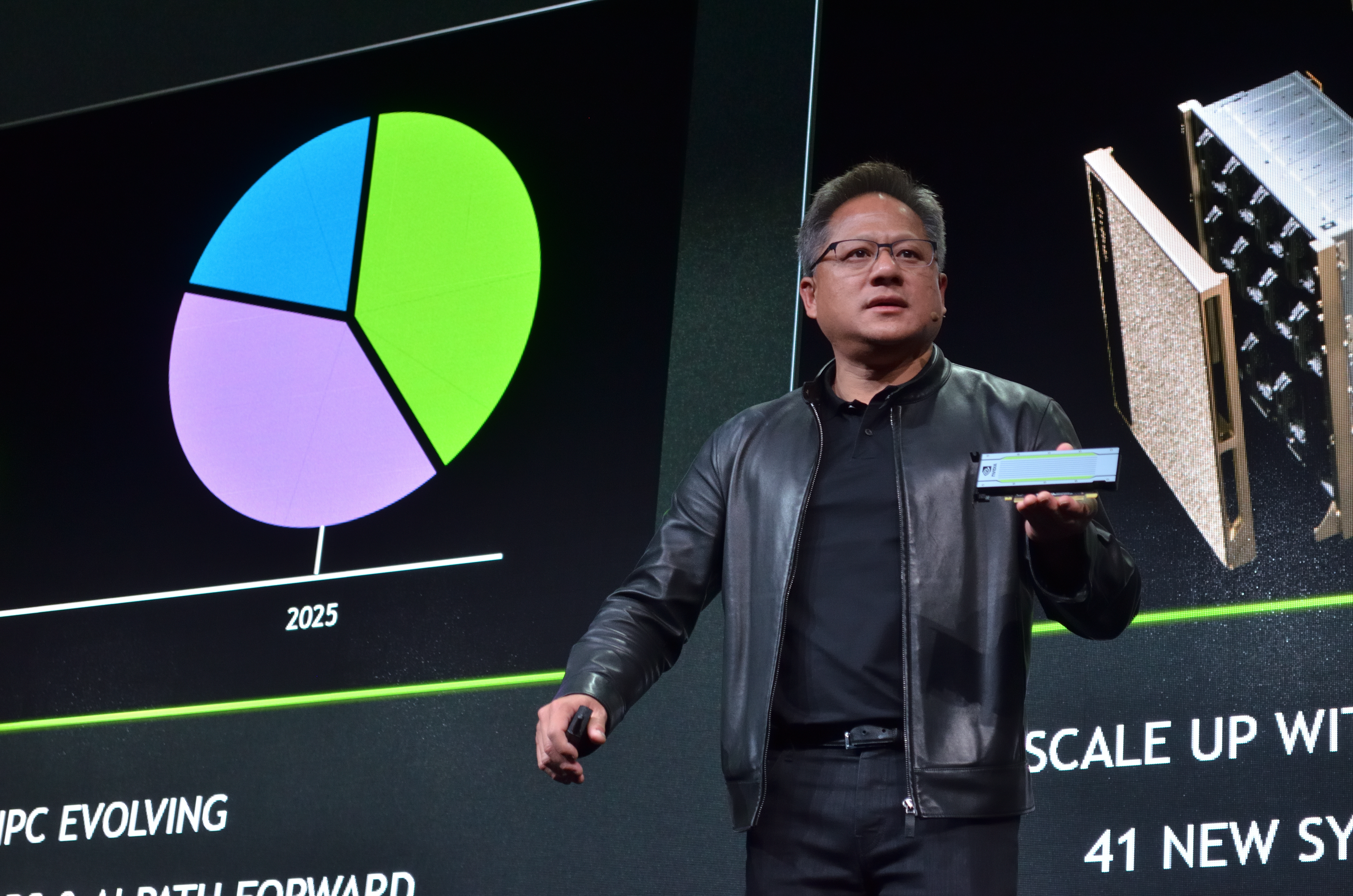
Huang at the ACM/IEEE Supercomputing Conference in 2018

Huang did not keep a fixed office. He roamed Nvidia's headquarters and settled temporarily in conference rooms as needed. He has said he does not wear a watch, because he believes that "now is the most important time". He preferred to maintain a relatively flat management structure, with around 60 direct reports as of November 2024, based upon his view that people reporting directly to him "should be at the top of their game" and "require the least amount of pampering".

His management style has also been characterized as abusive and belittling by employees, with Huang making graphic threats and ridiculing subordinates in front of colleagues or clients. In 2005, Nvidia terminated a vice president of human resources, Michael Winston, who objected to Huang's behavior. In response to the threat of legal action, Nvidia later settled with Winston for over a million dollars, though the company denied wrongdoing.

Historically, Huang and Nvidia were well-known only among the gamers and computer graphics experts who were the original intended markets for Nvidia's graphics processing unit (GPU) products. In 2017, a Fortune profile article suggested: "If you haven't heard of Nvidia, you can be forgiven." During the AI boom, Huang's net worth rose rapidly along with the value of Nvidia's stock, from US$3 billion in 2019 to US$90 billion in May 2024. During the same timeframe, Huang became more widely known. In March 2024, Mark Zuckerberg wrote on Instagram with a picture of himself and Huang wearing each other's signature jacket: "He's like Taylor Swift, but for tech".

Huang with Mark Zuckerberg and Elon Musk at an artificial intelligence luncheon hosted by U.S. president Donald Trump at the White House, September 29, 2026

In June 2024, Nvidia's market capitalization reached US$3 trillion for the first time and Huang's net worth grew to US$100 billion. By then, the news media was using the term "Jensanity" to refer to Huang's celebrity status in Taiwan, and it was compared to the "Linsanity" phenomenon of 2012. Huang was the center of attention at Computex 2024 in Taipei, even though he was not on the official speaking program. Large crowds of fans and paparazzi followed Huang and his family members around every time they appeared in public during their 2024 visit to Taiwan.

In January 2025, Huang delivered the keynote address at the Consumer Electronics Show in Las Vegas. During this keynote, Huang made a number of announcements such as a new gaming GPU series called the GeForce RTX 50 series for both PCs and laptops. In October 2025, Nvidia became the first publicly traded company in the world to reach a market capitalization exceeding $5 trillion.

In 2026, Huang was appointed to the President's Council of Advisors on Science and Technology (PCAST) by President Donald Trump.

=== Scandal and resignation (2026) ===
Beginning on October 29, 2026, The New York Times published a series of reports that the United States federal government believed Huang had a "close relationship" with Chinese tech executive Alice Huang. (Note: Chinese name: Huang Le; 黄乐) Despite sharing a surname, the two have no direct familial connection. Alice Huang worked at Megaspeed, a Singapore-based company that purchases Nvidia's AI chips, and it was reported that U.S. intelligence sources believed she was recruited by China's Ministry of State Security as a spy.

Following these reports, on November 8, Jensen Huang admitted to marital infidelity in an internal memo to Nvidia employees. On November 8, Nvidia's board launched an investigation into Jensen Huang while stating that they have "no reason to believe that either national security or NVIDIA secrets were compromised" and that "The Board has confidence in Jensen and his leadership team."

On November 11, 2026, The New York Times reported that Huang had a second affair with Nvidia's vice president of healthcare Kimberly Powell, a married woman who reports to him. The two were allegedly filmed "being affectionate" at a hotel during a company conference. The affair was in violation of Nvidia's code of conduct, which advises employees to avoid "personal relationships" that "create conflict". Three people briefed on the incident stated that the incident at the hotel was captured by a bystander, who was caught by Huang's security team and made to sign a non-disclosure agreement.

That same day, The Wall Street Journal reported that Nvidia's board was set to meet as soon as November 11 to "determine his future" and to prepare to oust Huang. Huang resigned as president and CEO on November 12, with CFO and executive vice president Colette Kress becoming the company's interim CEO. Nvidia confirmed Huang would have no role in the company going forward. Later that day, Reuters reported that Huang had a third affair with a second Nvidia employee, whose name has not been disclosed.

U.S. attorney general Todd Blanche stated on November 12 that the Justice Department has not yet reached a conclusion regarding whether Alice Huang was acting as a spy for Beijing. The same day, CNN reported, citing multiple sources, that the intelligence collected on Alice Huang to date did not prove she had acted as a spy for Beijing, and that U.S. officials disagreed about the strength of the evidence that she had been recruited by China's Ministry of State Security.

Following his resignation, Jensen Huang retained white-collar defense litigators Melinda Haag and Walter Brown from Paul, Weiss amid widening federal inquiries and an impending congressional hearing, at which he has agreed to testify. Concurrently, the U.S. Department of Justice is pursuing an antitrust probe focused directly on Nvidia alongside separate export-control investigations into Supermicro and Megaspeed regarding ties to Alice Huang, with officials indicating no criminal charges against Nvidia or Huang.

== Personal life ==
As of November 2026, Forbes estimates Huang's net worth to be US$110.1 billion, making him the 18th-wealthiest person in the world.

While at Oregon State University, Huang met his future wife, Lori Huang (née Mills), who was his engineering lab partner at the time. They have two children. (Note: Chinese name: Huang Shengbin 黃勝斌) (Note: Chinese name: Huang Minshan 黃敏珊) The Huang family lived in ordinary middle-class starter homes in San Jose before Nvidia went public in 1999. In 2003, they moved to a larger house in nearby Los Altos Hills and they acquired a second home in Wailea, Hawaii, the following year. In 2017, a limited liability company reportedly linked to the Huangs acquired a mansion in San Francisco for $38 million.

Huang is a relative of Lisa Su, AMD's chair and CEO. Huang's mother is the youngest sister of Su's maternal grandfather, making them first cousins, once removed. Huang was unaware of their familial connection until Su became AMD's CEO.

A December 2024 investigation by The New York Times reported that Huang had set up an intentionally defective grantor trust and a grantor retained annuity trust. It was estimated that these trusts and his foundation would reduce his family's estate tax by US$8 billion.

Huang has dual Taiwanese and United States citizenship. During his time at AMD in 1984, Huang, who grew up speaking Taiwanese Hokkien, began learning Mandarin Chinese in order to communicate with Chinese photomask workers employed at the company. He has said that he learned the language phonetically through regular conversations with his co-workers. He makes frequent visits back to Taiwan.

Huang and Taiwanese billionaire Charles Liang, co-founder of Supermicro, are longtime friends. Both companies were established in 1993 and have collaborated on products, with the latter utilizing Nvidia AI chips in its servers. Huang is also a close friend of TSMC founder Morris Chang.

Huang got a tattoo of an abstract version of the Nvidia logo when the company's stock price hit US$100, which he first publicly showed at the 2010 GPU Technology Conference. The Times of India described the tattoo, along with the black leather jacket he frequently wears, as "his signature style", while The New York Times considered Huang's jacket "poised to step neatly into that gap" of "a popularly identifiable face of A.I." In 2026, a leather jacket worn by Huang was sold at an auction for US$960,000.

== Philanthropy ==
Jensen Huang and his wife, Lori Huang, established the Jen-Hsun & Lori Huang Foundation in 2007 and donated $330 million of Nvidia shares. The foundation's assets, primarily Nvidia shares, have significantly appreciated, reaching a value exceeding US$12 billion as of late 2025, placing it among the largest private foundations in the United States. Approximately two-thirds of its grants are allocated to donor-advised funds, including the GeForce Fund at Schwab Charitable. In June 2025, the Huangs contributed an additional $60 million in Nvidia stock to the foundation.

Huang with U.S. president Donald Trump and Saudi crown prince Mohammed bin Salman at the U.S.-Saudi Investment Forum at the Kennedy Center in Washington, D.C., November 19, 2025

On October 14, 2022, Jensen and Lori Huang donated $50 million toward a new $213 million research and education center at Oregon State University. The center will house one of the nation's most powerful supercomputers, built around Nvidia's DGX SuperPOD and OVX SuperPOD systems, giving faculty the computing power to tackle complex research problems. Waste heat from the system's cooling will be repurposed to heat over 500,000 square feet of building space on Oregon State's Corvallis campus.

In early 2025, the foundation matched a $22.5 million fundraising effort by the California College of the Arts, contributing an equivalent amount to complete a $45 million campaign to address the institution's financial deficits and enrollment challenges, marking one of the largest individual gifts in the college's history. The foundation has also provided grants ranging from five to six figures to organizations including Monterey Bay Aquarium, the Law Foundation of Silicon Valley, the Tides Center, the B612 Foundation, AI4ALL (promoting diversity in artificial intelligence), and Mental Health Innovations (developing technology-based mental health solutions). In accordance with Internal Revenue Service regulations for private foundations, the foundation disbursed $123 million in 2024 and was projected to distribute $369 million in 2025.

In 2026, Huang donated $10 million to relief efforts for the 2026 Nepal–Tibet floods.

== See also ==
- Huang's law – Computer science observation
