= Chief (women's network) =

Women's business network

- Type: Private company
- Industry: Women's professional network
- Founded: January 2019; 7 years ago
- Founders: Carolyn Childers; Lindsay Kaplan
- Headquarters: New York City, United States
- Number of locations: 4 (2026)
- Services: Mentoring, workshops, workspaces, executive coaching, events, enterprise corporate partnerships and related services for women executives
- Members: 20,000 (2022)
- Website: chief.com

Chief is a private women's business networking organization for senior leaders. The membership-based community was launched in New York in 2019. The company attained unicorn status in 2022. As of 2026, Chief is accessed by members online, at hosted live events, and at its four clubhouses across the United States.

== History ==
Chief was launched as a networking organization for senior executive women in January 2019 by former Handy and Primary Venture Partners executive Carolyn Childers and former Casper vice president Lindsay Kaplan. The membership-based business network is headquartered in New York City.

In June 2019, the company raised $22 million in a Series A funding round led by Chief board members – General Catalyst chairman Ken Chenault and Alexa von Tobel, managing partner of Inspired Capital. Early investors also included GGV Capital, Primary Venture Partners, Flybridge Capital, and BoxGroup. In October 2022, Chief became a $1.1 billion unicorn following a Series B funding round which raised a total of $140 million in 2022 from General Catalyst, GGV Capital, Inspired Capital, Primary Ventures and Flybridge, led by Alphabet subsidiary CapitalG's $100 million investment, with its partner, Laela Sturdy, joining Chief's board.

In 2020, in response to the COVID-19 pandemic, Chief transitioned from in-person networking to exclusively virtual activity, bolstering growth as women accessed online platforms in greater numbers. Membership was 400 in March 2019, and 2,000 one year later. Two years later, membership reached 12,000 women leaders from 8,500 companies, with over three-quarters of members employed by Fortune 100 companies. In October 2022, membership reached 20,000.

In March 2023, Fortune magazine reported criticism from some members; Chief acknowledged "growing pains" in pivoting to a fully digital model during the pandemic-era and scaling quickly in response to heightened demand. The company stated that they have addressed operational challenges. Criticism was also noted for perceived under-representation in diversity and in social and political engagement.

In October 2023, Chief kicked off an annual event series branded as ChiefX, bringing together executive members across multiple U.S. cities to share insights on leadership and professional development. Past ChiefX speakers include Sallie Krawcheck, Allyson Felix, Valerie Jarrett, Jenna Lyons, and Hoda Kotb.

In early 2024, Chief announced the inaugural The New Era of Leadership Awards, an initiative to recognize senior women executives and organizations that exemplified modern leadership across industries. Winners were selected based on innovation, empathy, creativity, purpose, and resilience.

In January 2025, Chief appointed Alison Moore as its Chief Executive Officer, succeeding previous leadership and marking a strategic transition in the organization’s executive leadership. Previously, Moore served as CEO of Comic Relief US and held executive leadership roles at HBO, DailyCandy, NBCUniversal, SoundCloud, and Condé Nast. In November 2025, Moore was named one of U.S. News & World Report’s Best Leaders in Business.

In May 2025, Chief hosted the second annual The New Era of Leadership Awards to honor 100 women executives shaping the future of business, judged by a panel including senior leaders from companies such as The Walt Disney Company, Etsy, Axios, and others.

As of August 2026, Chief has physical clubhouses in New York, Chicago, San Francisco, and Washington, D.C.

== Operations ==
With subscription to its digital platform integral to the company business model, Chief's mission is "to drive more women to the top — and keep them there" by constructing a live and online support system for senior executive leaders. However, after the pandemic, it reprioritized in-person experiences in local Chief communities across the U.S. with its current mission "to create more possibilities for women’s power." Chief membership grants access to its "vetted network" of peers; mentoring; workshops; curated monthly peer groups with executive coaches; and talks with noted women executives, such as Amal Clooney, Indra Nooyi, Michelle Obama, Arianna Huffington, Gloria Steinem, and Mindy Kaling. Chief also offers executive education courses in partnership with the Wharton School of Business. As of October 2025, clubhouse access is included in base membership, with private meeting rooms and event rentals available for additional fees.

Chief operates on a membership-based model designed for women in senior executive and leadership positions. Members participate in curated peer groups, one-on-one executive coaching from International Coaching Federation certified coaches, and programming intended to facilitate professional connection, leadership development, and discussion of business and workplace issues.

The organization’s operations have also emphasized convening executives across industries, with participation from business leaders, policymakers, and cultural figures through events, interviews, and moderated discussions.

Originally, Chief membership was limited to women and non-binary vice presidents and C-Suite executives, with about 70 percent of members sponsored by their individual employers. As of October 2025, membership criteria has expanded to include senior leaders in fractional and consulting roles, as well as founders and solopreneurs and those in career transition.

In 2023, it launched Chief Enterprise, with clients including UnitedHealth Group, Morgan Stanley and IBM.

Chief conducts surveys and partners with organizations on research into women’s leadership and the workplace. In 2026, a Chief survey conducted with The Harris Poll found that 80% of women leaders surveyed were involved in their organizations’ AI strategies, including AI governance and responsible implementation.

== See also ==
- Gender representation on corporate boards of directors
- Women in business
- List of women in leadership
- List of women CEOs of Fortune 500 companies
