= Curtis Priem =

American electrical engineer (born 1958/59)

- Born: 1958 or 1959 (age 66–67)
- Education: Rensselaer Polytechnic Institute (BS)
- Known for: Co-founding Nvidia
- Scientific career
- Fields: Electrical engineering
- Workplaces: IBM; Sun Microsystems; Nvidia

Curtis R. Priem (born 1958 or 1959) is an American electrical engineer known for co-founding Nvidia along with Jensen Huang and Chris Malachowsky in 1993. He left the company in 2003 and sold all of his shares by 2006.

== Life and career ==
Priem was born in 1958 or 1959. He received a Bachelor of Science in electrical engineering from Rensselaer Polytechnic Institute in 1982. He designed the first professional graphics processor for the PC, the IBM Professional Graphics Adapter, while working for Vermont Microsystems in Winooski, Vermont.

From 1986 to 1993, Priem was a senior staff engineer at Sun Microsystems, where he developed the GX graphics chip. He co-founded Nvidia with Jensen Huang and Chris Malachowsky and was its chief technical officer from 1993 to 2003. Priem retired from Nvidia in 2003 and sold all of his shares in the company by 2006. In November 2023, Forbes estimated Priem's net worth to be approximately $30 million; if he had retained his shares in Nvidia, Forbes estimated that Priem would have been worth $70 billion.

In 2000, Priem was named Entrepreneur of the Year. Since 2003, he has been a trustee of Rensselaer and became the vice chair of the Board in 2024. In 2004, Priem announced that he would donate an unrestricted gift of $40 million to the Institute. Rensselaer subsequently created the Curtis R. Priem Experimental Media and Performing Arts Center, named in his honor and usually referred to as "EMPAC" for short.

Priem is also president of the Priem Family Foundation, which he established with his wife Veronica in September 1999. The foundation is non-operating (i.e., has no office or staff, and therefore, no overhead) and exists only to give money to other foundations or charities.
