= Intentionally defective grantor trust =

Tax avoidance scheme in the United States

An Intentionally defective grantor trust is a tax avoidance scheme sometimes used to reduce estate taxes in the United States. It works as follows:

1. The grantor creates a trust
2. The grantor transfers investment assets into the trust, but retains the power to "reacquire the trust corpus by substituting other property of equivalent value". The transfer is valid (complete) for estate tax purposes but is incomplete for income tax purposes.
3. The grantor pays gift tax on the transfer.
4. During the grantor's lifetime, the grantor pays income taxes on any increase in the value of the assets in the trust. The trust grows, but its "value" for estate tax purposes is "frozen" at the time of the transfer. If the trust grows substantially, the increase is not subject to estate tax (which is usually at a higher rate than the grantor's marginal income tax rate).
5. If the assets decrease in value, the grantor can sell them (leaving the sales price in the trust, or using it to acquire other assets for the trust). The grantor can then apply that loss to decrease the taxable value increase on other assets if any, but the value for estate tax purposes will not decrease.
