= Experimental Media and Performing Arts Center =

Multi-venue arts center in Troy, New York

Curtis R. Priem Experimental Media and Performing Arts Center
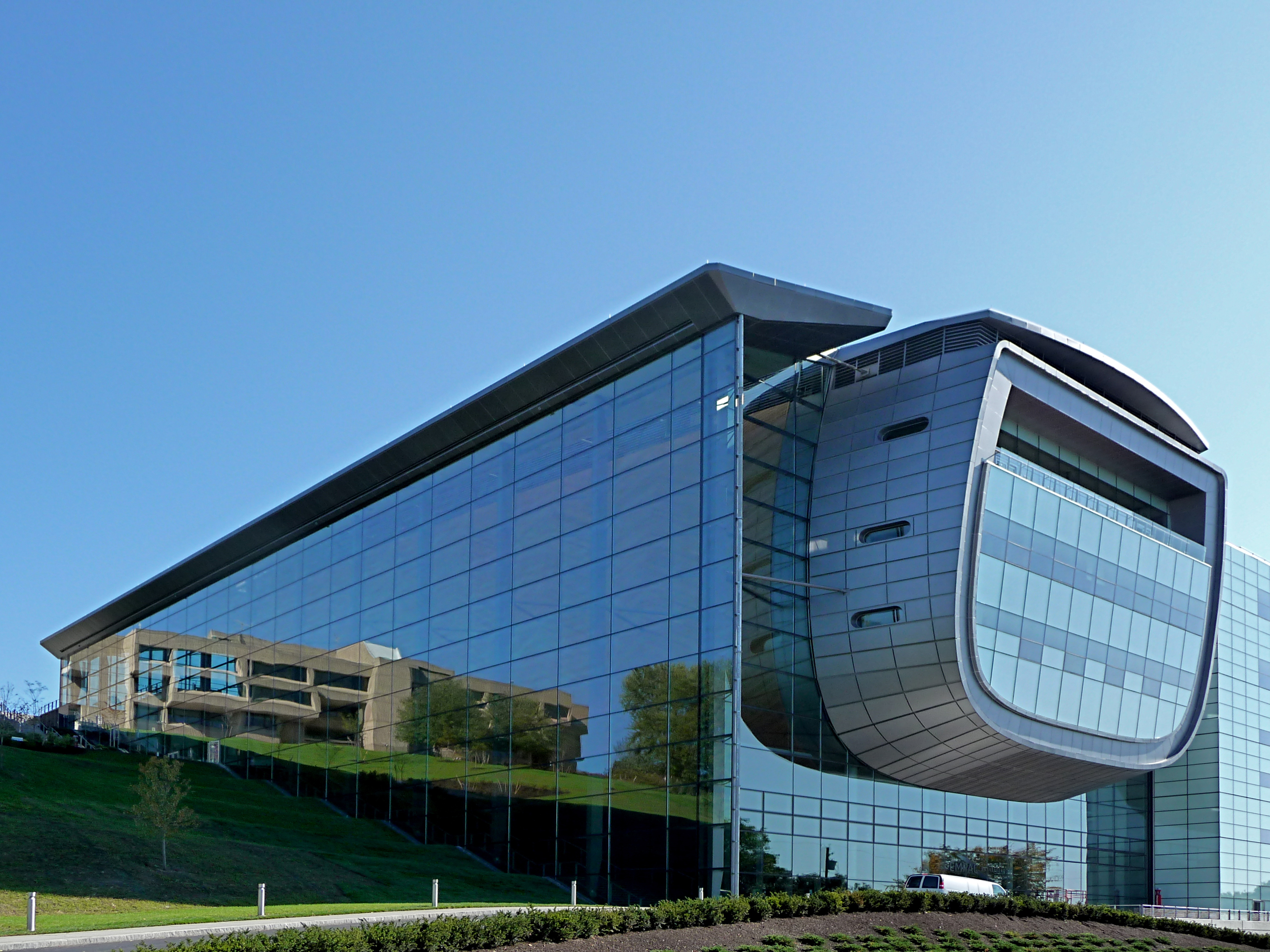
- EMPAC on RPI's campus with the brutalist Folsom Library reflecting in the glass
- Interactive map of the Curtis R. Priem Experimental Media and Performing Arts Center area
- Alternative names: EMPAC
- Etymology: Named for Curtis Priem

General information
- Location: Troy, New York, United States
- Coordinates: 42.72883°N 73.68396°W
- Opened: October 3, 2008
- Cost: $141,000,000
- Owner: Rensselaer Polytechnic Institute

Technical details
- Floor count: 7

Design and construction
- Architecture firm: Grimshaw Architects, Davis Brody Bond
- Engineer: Buro Happold

Other information
- Seating capacity: 1,200 (main concert hall), 400 (theater)

Website
- empac.rpi.edu

The Curtis R. Priem Experimental Media and Performing Arts Center (EMPAC) is a multi-venue arts center at Rensselaer Polytechnic Institute in Troy, New York, which opened on October 3, 2008. The building is named after Curtis Priem, co-founder of NVIDIA and graduate of the RPI Class of 1982, who donated $40 million to the Institute in 2004.

== Role on campus of a technological university ==
The Center is a significant change in focus from the traditional focus on this science and engineering campus, although the Darrin Communication Center is similar. The administration claims that "EMPAC introduces a new model for educating the next generation of leaders, who will be better prepared to solve the complex problems facing our world."

== Architecture and facilities ==
The acoustical firm Kirkegaard Associates was contracted to work on the system. Extensive computer modeling was done of the ceiling canopy before construction to optimize the transmission of sound waves. EMPAC is the first venue to use Nomex fire-retardant fabric for a ceiling canopy to reflect sound waves. The exterior of the main concert hall is lined with 36,000 square feet (3,300 m^{2}) of Western Red Cedar. Grown in sustainable forests in British Columbia, the wood was chosen for its fire-retardant properties. A 20,000-square-foot (1,900 m^{2}) glass wall lines the north side of the building. A water/glycol mix circulating through the steel support beams maintains an even temperature and limits condensation on the glass. EMPAC is also LEED Silver certified.

EMPAC is also home to a 400-seat theater with an 80′ x 40′ stage, 60′ fly tower, and computer controlled rigging. EMPAC also has two very large projection screens: a 50' x 40' one in the theater and a 60' wide screen in the concert hall. There are two main multi-purpose studio spaces. Studio 1 has 3,500-square-foot (330 m^{2}) and has 40-foot-high ceilings, and Studio 2 is 2,500-square-foot (230 m^{2}) with 28-foot (8.5 m)-high ceilings. There is also a 1,400-square-foot (130 m^{2}) rehearsal studio called Studio Beta, and 4 Artist-in-Residence studios (with one being permanently occupied by the Institute President). Studio 1 and Studio 2 are lined with acoustical panels to diffuse sound using innovative paneling designed to simulate the characteristics of tree bark. Different panels are designed to absorb and refract different frequencies of sound. All performance spaces have a maximum noise floor of 15 dB, making them some of the quietest artistic presentation spaces in the world.

A 360-degree projection system has been developed, which is used for virtual reality research, art works, and cinematic presentations. The current system has a 40-foot (12 m) round, 15-foot (4.6 m) tall circular screen which surrounds viewers, who either can walk around or view from swivel chairs. Special 360-degree cameras are used for filming, along with microphones which record directionality. The sound can then be played back on an array of surround-sound speakers, allowing sound projection from any angle toward the audience.

== Construction ==
The institute announced plans for the construction of a new performance hall in Fall of 2001 with construction costs originally slated at $50 million. After a design competition and discussions with architectural firms, the plans were revised with a new construction cost of $141 million and completion date of sometime in 2006. While some thought that RPI needed improved music and arts facilities, the increased size and construction cost were seen as unnecessarily expensive by many students and faculty.

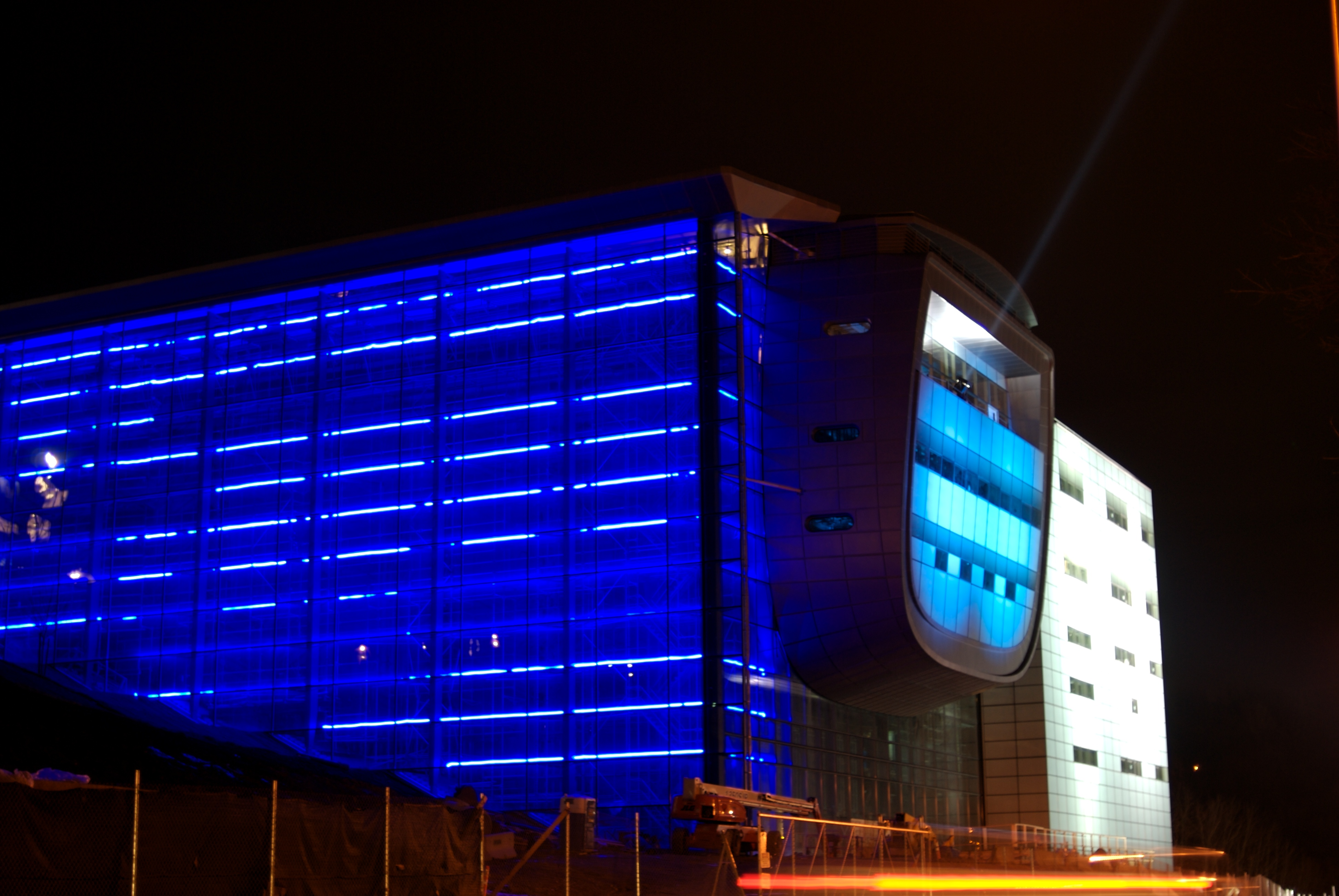
"Lights above the Hudson" display, while under construction, January 2008

The project broke ground on September 19, 2003. During 2004 the Institute began a large capital campaign and Rensselaer alumnus and trustee Curtis Priem, '82, donated $40 million in an unrestricted gift. RPI decided to officially name the project in his honor. Additionally, the Institute received a $1 million gift for EMPAC programs from alumnus David Jaffe in 2006.

Over 100,000 cubic yards of earth were evacuated from the hill to make room for the structure. RPI has had problems in the past with the instability of the ground on the hillside, a phenomenon known as mass wasting. To prevent the EMPAC from "sliding down the hill", 215 rock anchors were drilled into the ground to stabilize the foundations. At over 210 feet (64 m) long, they are some of the largest anchors in North America.

In September 2005, the institute hosted EMPAC 360: On Site + Sound, a multimedia and performing arts presentation to celebrate the midpoint of construction. The event was attended by over 3000 people from the region. The expected completion date was moved to sometime in 2008. In January 2008, RPI commissioned lighting designer Jennifer Tipton to create a large lighting display called "Light Above the Hudson". Operational for several weeks, the display drew attention to the center with a 300 by 100-foot (30 m) array of multicolored lights and search lights pointed into the sky.

== Gallery ==
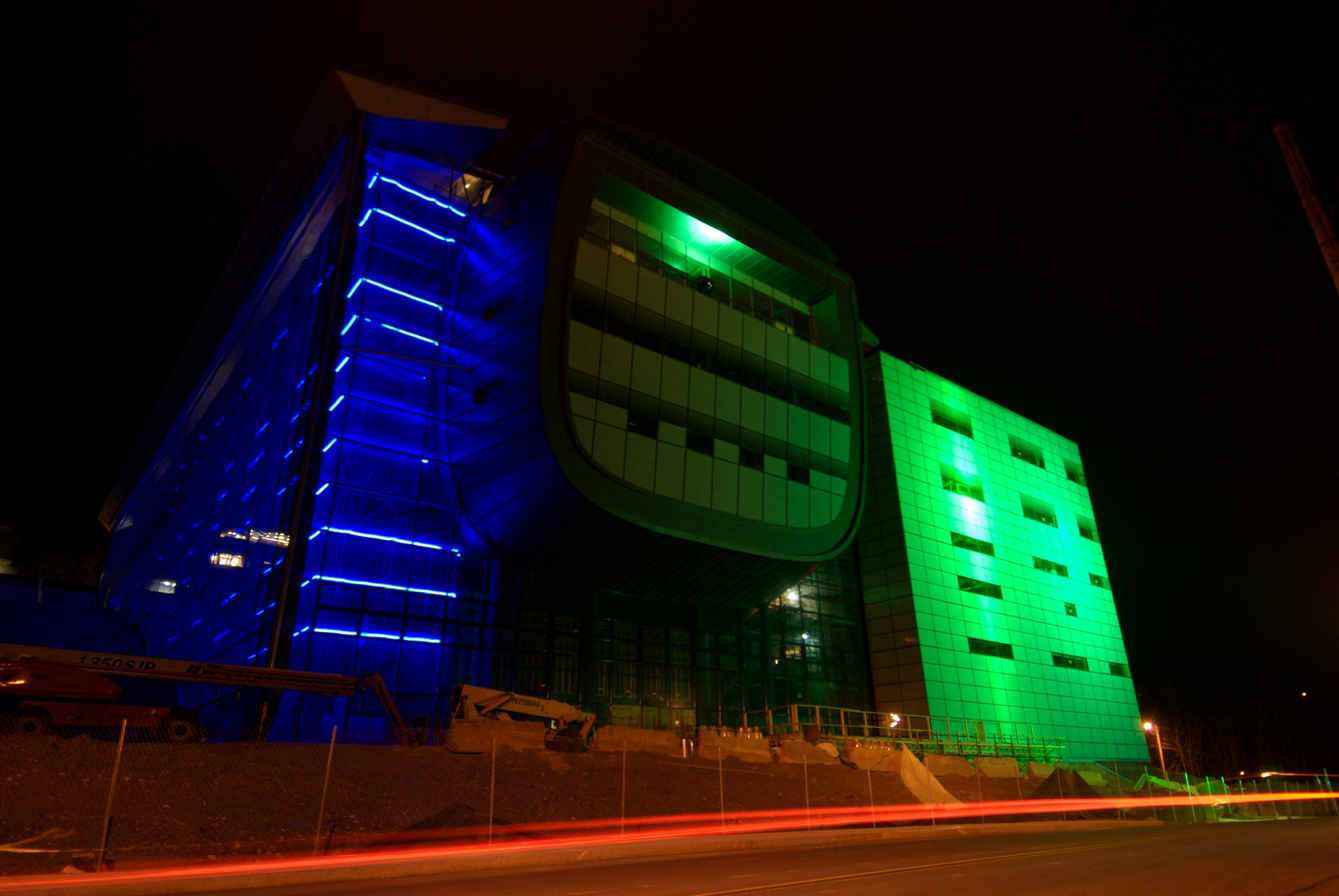
"Lights Above the Hudson" display, January 2008

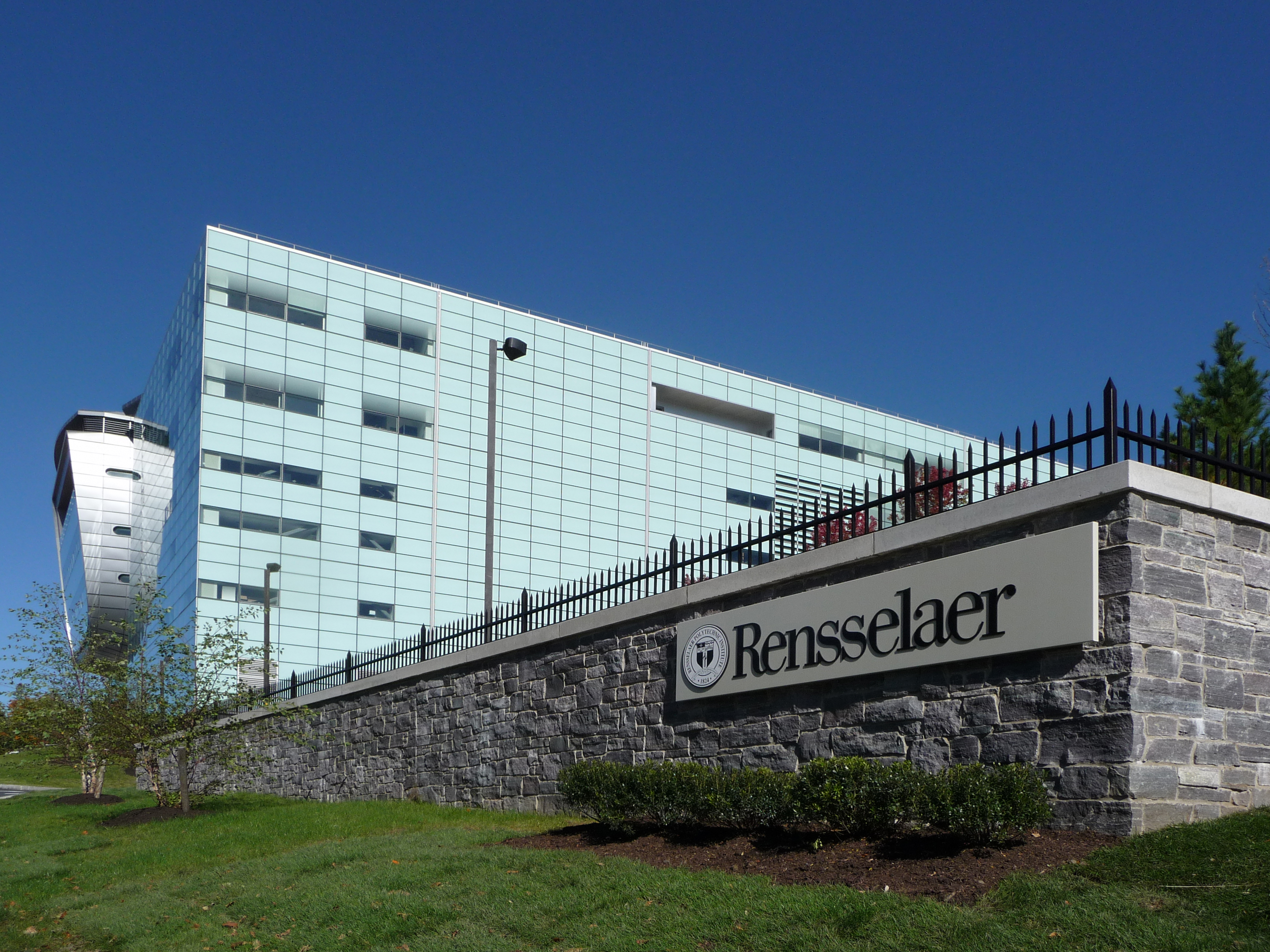
Southwest corner of EMPAC grounds

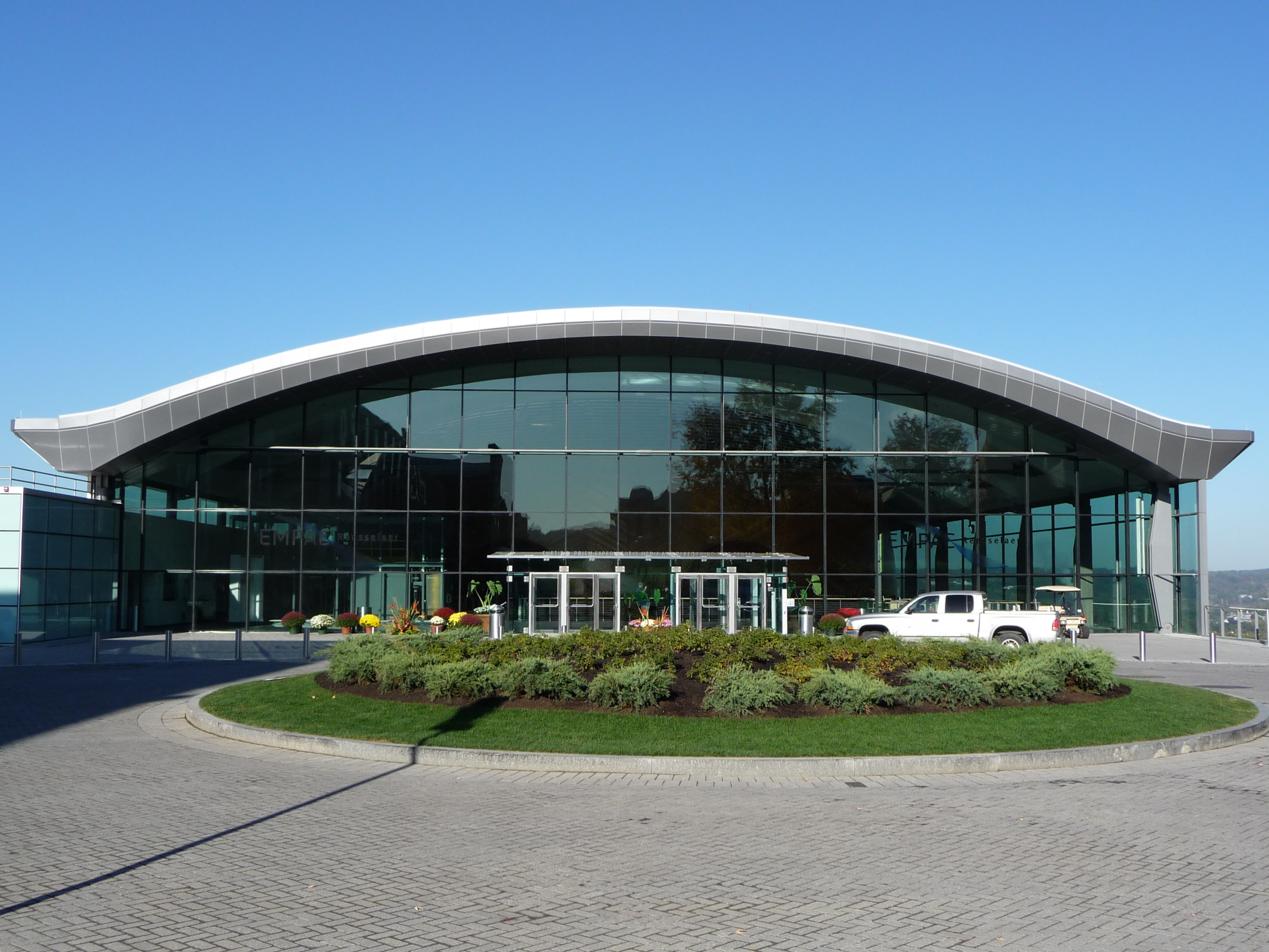
East entrance of EMPAC

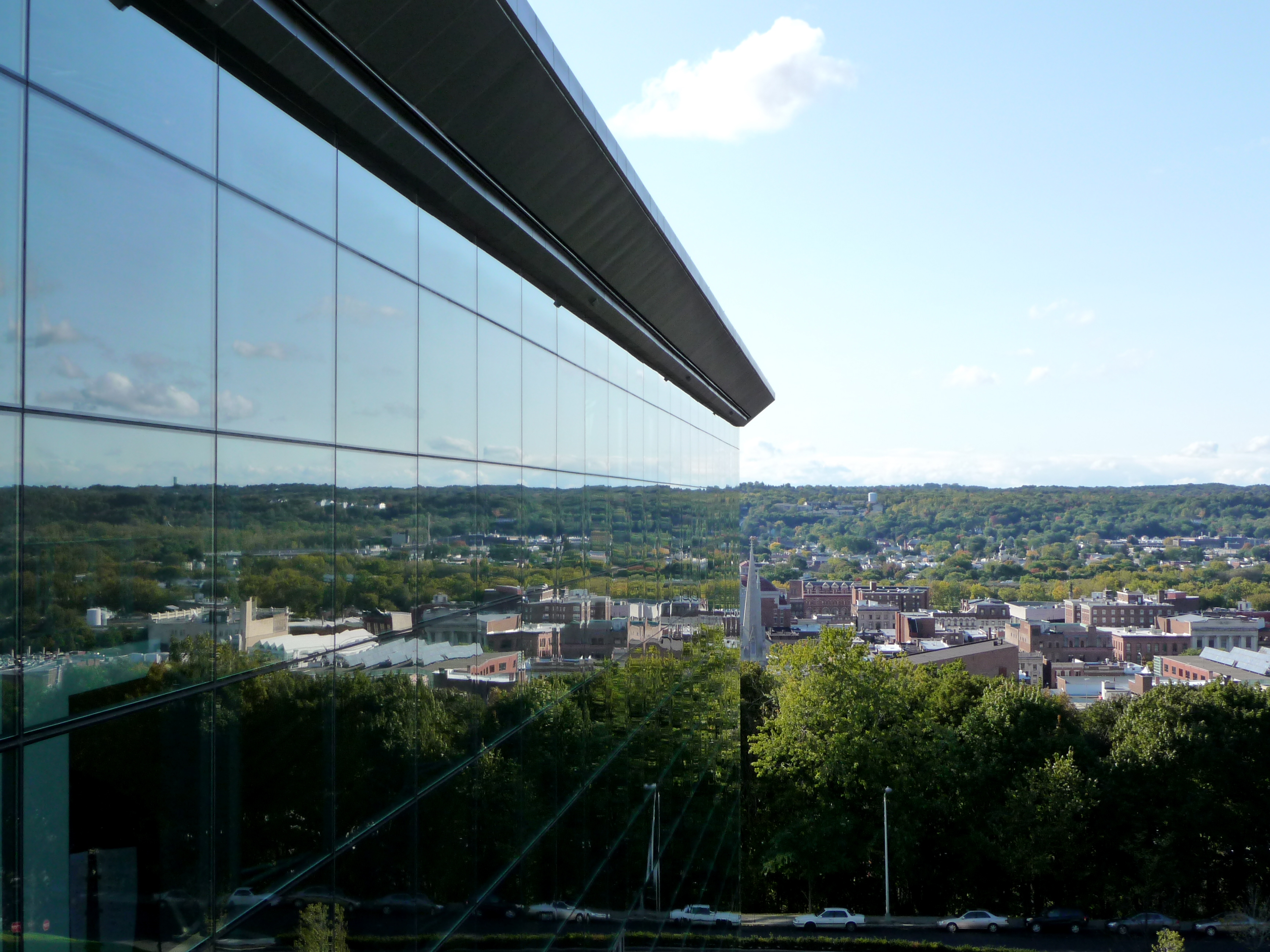
North face of EMPAC with glass façade

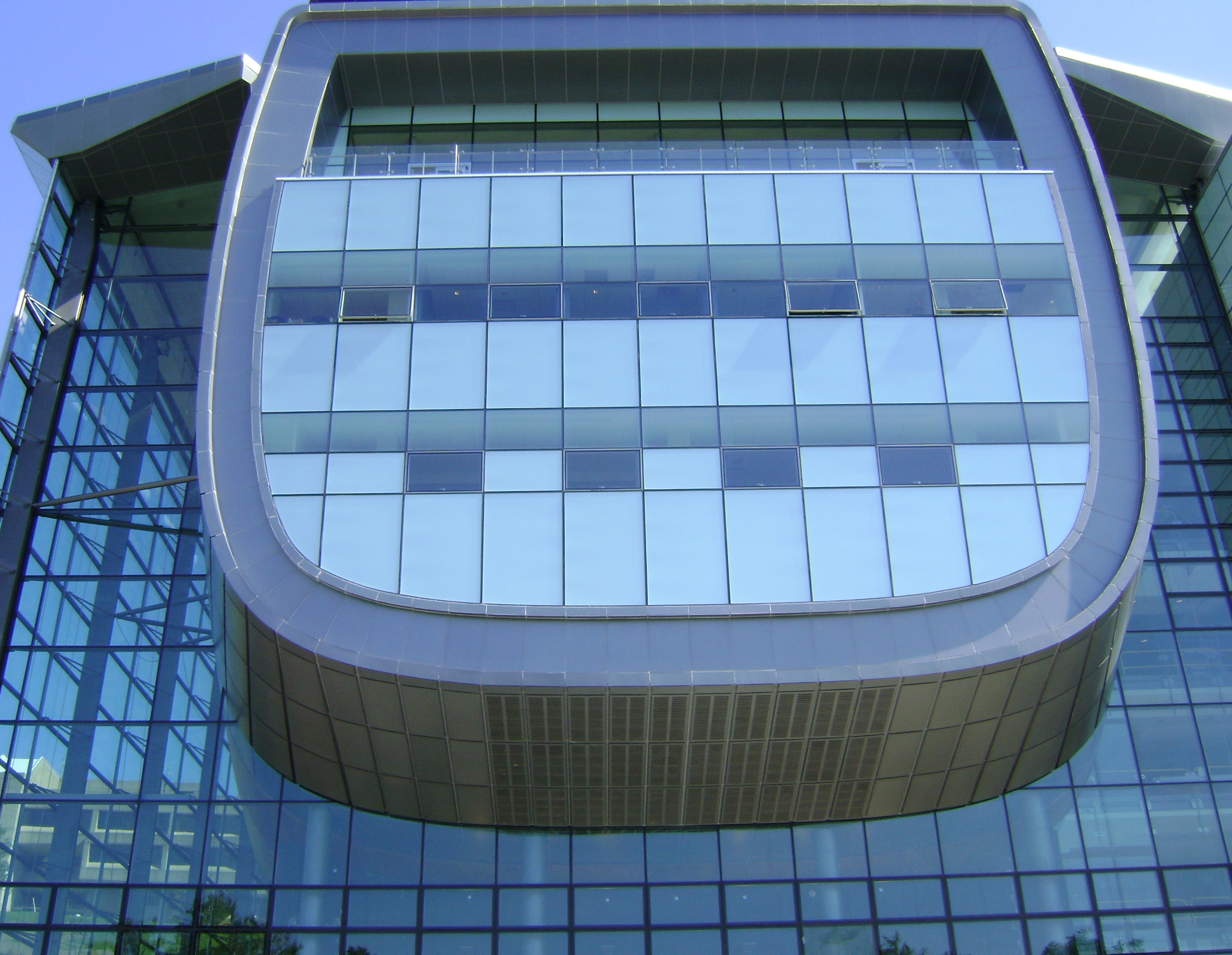
West face of EMPAC

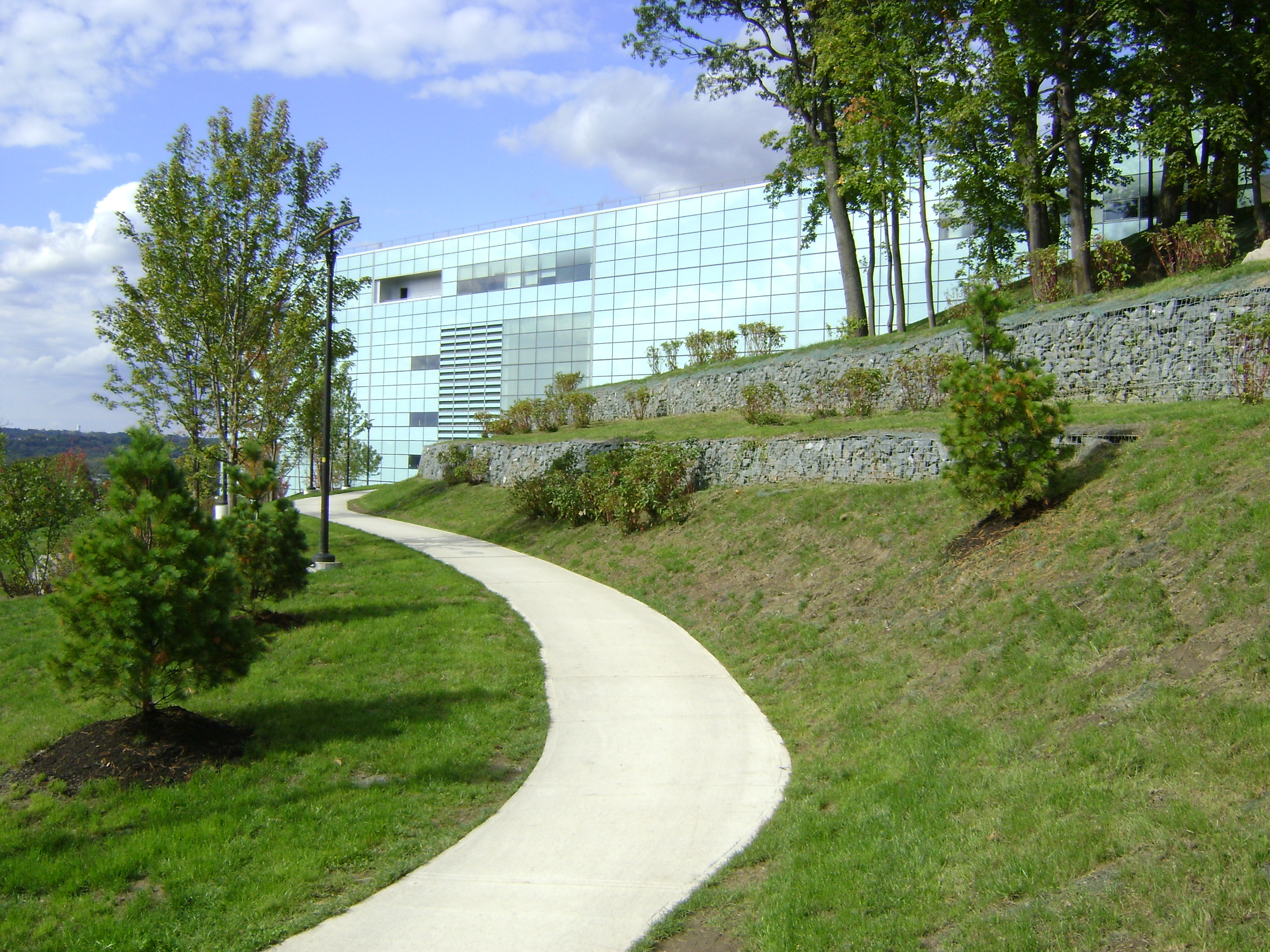
South side of EMPAC

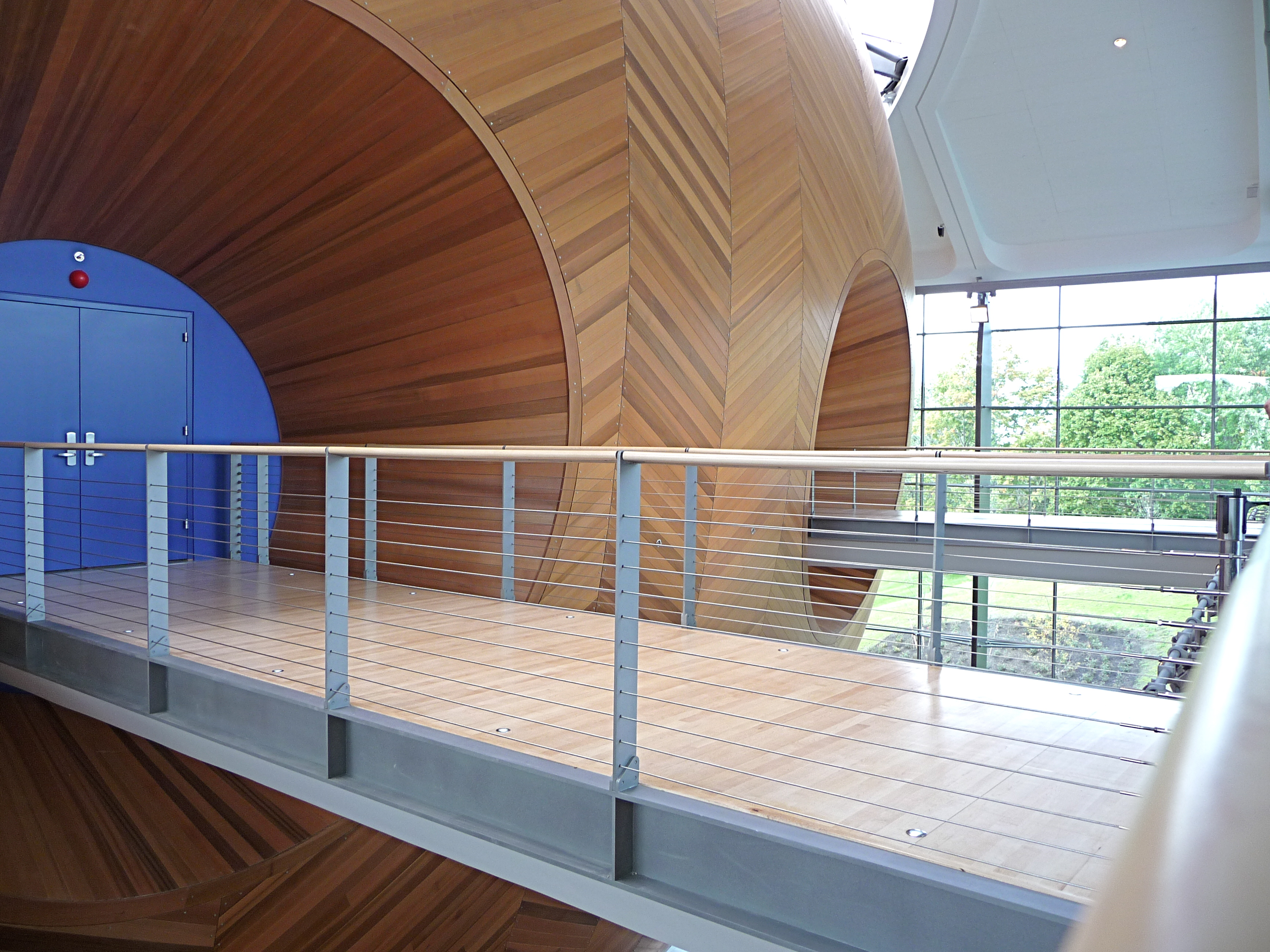
Balcony entrances to the main performance hall

Grand staircase in EMPAC

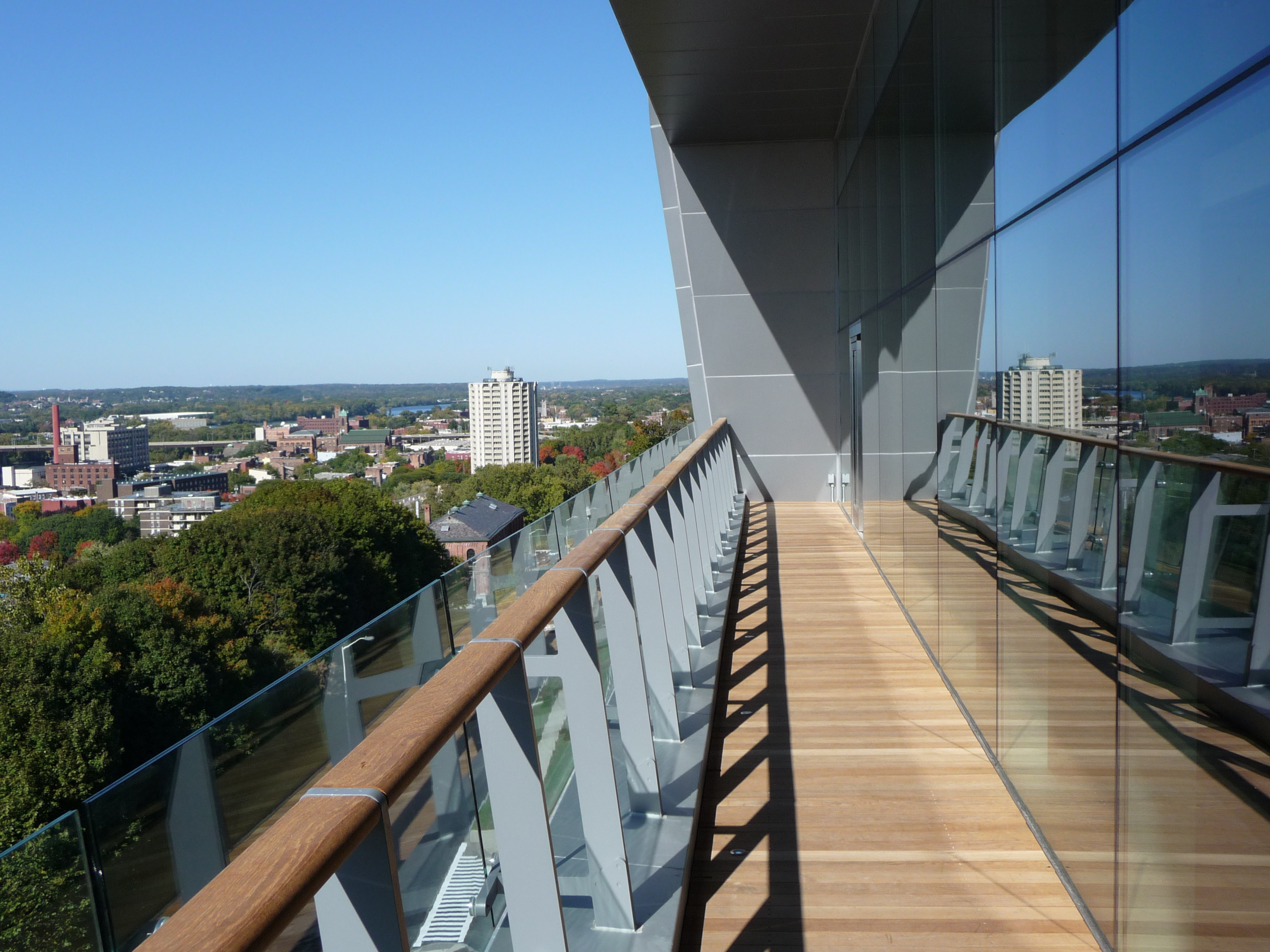
Founders' Room Balcony overlooking the City of Troy
