= Casper Sleep =

American mattress company

Casper Sleep Inc.

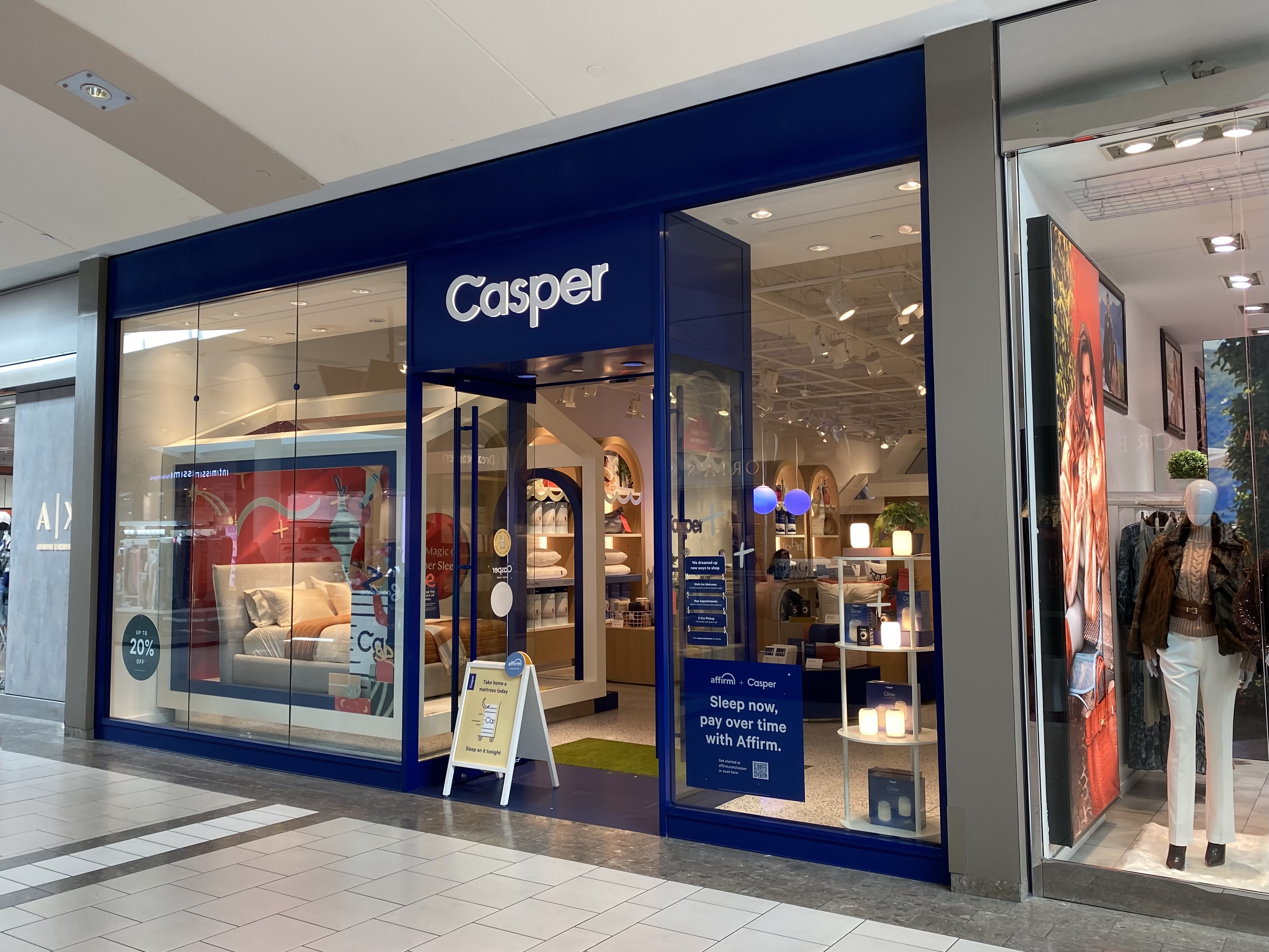
- Casper store located inside Dadeland Mall
- Type: Private
- Traded as: NYSE: CSPR (2020–2022)
- Industry: Mattresses
- Founded: April 22, 2014; 12 years ago
- Founders: Philip Krim; Neil Parikh; T. Luke Sherwin; Jeff Chapin; Gabe Flateman
- Headquarters: New York City, New York, U.S.
- Area served: United States
- Products: Mattresses, pillows, sheets, dog mattresses
- Revenue: ▲$439.258 million(2019)
- Operating income: ▲ -$88.746 million (2019)
- Net income: ▼ -$93.04 million (2019)
- Total assets: ▲$230 million (2019)
- Total equity: ▼ -$307.094 million (2019)
- Owner: Carpenter Co. (2024–present)
- Website: casper.com

Casper Sleep Inc. is an American company headquartered in New York City that designs and sells sleep products including mattresses, pillows, furniture, bedding and sleep accessories. Founded in 2014, the company initially marketed itself as a direct-to-consumer e-commerce brand before expanding into physical retail stores and partnerships with other retailers. Casper’s mattresses are designed and assembled in the United States and sold across the country. In 2024, Casper was acquired by Carpenter Co., a major manufacturer of polyurethane foam and related products.

== History ==
=== Corporate and financial ===
Casper Sleep was founded in 2014 by a group of entrepreneurs (Philip Krim, Neil Parikh, T. Luke Sherwin, Jeff Chapin, Gabe Flateman). In 2014, Casper raised $1.85 million in seed funding followed by a $13.1 million Series A, with investors including Lerer Ventures, Norwest Ventures, NEA, SV Angel, Ashton Kutcher’s A-Grade, Steven Alan, Queensbridge Venture Partners, and Nas. The company officially launched on April 22, 2014.

Casper launched with a single mattress model and expanded its line as demand grew. Casper expanded into Canada in 2014, and later into Europe. In 2020, Casper closed its European operations, and in 2023 its Canadian business was acquired by Sleep Country Canada.

In October 2024, Casper was acquired by Carpenter Co.

== Products and Delivery ==
Casper offers a variety of sleep products, with its core line consisting of mattress models made of foam and hybrid models made of foam and springs. Their most recent e-commerce mattress models include the Casper One, Cloud One, Dream, Dream Max, Snow, and Snow Max.

Casper sells mattresses and other sleep-related products through its website, retail stores, and partner retailers. Mattresses are shipped compressed in boxes for delivery. The company also offers pillows, bedding, bed frames, and other accessories.

== Technology and Design ==
Casper’s mattresses use multiple layers of foam with varying densities to provide support and pressure relief. Some models include zoned support foams, cooling materials, or hybrid constructions that combine foam with innerspring coils. The company has filed patents related to mattress design and has employed ergonomists and engineers in product development.

== Controversies ==
In April 2016, Casper sued three mattress review websites which had written negative reviews of Casper products. According to the lawsuits, the websites steered potential customers of Casper products to competing mattress companies, which Casper claimed is a deceptive advertising practice. The lawsuit against one of the review websites, Sleepopolis, was resolved after Casper financed its acquisition.

== Awards and recognition ==
Casper has received industry recognition for product quality, durability, and marketing innovation. In 2016, Fast Company named Casper one of its “Most Innovative Companies.” Consumer Reports has also reviewed Casper mattresses in independent product testing.

- 2025 – Casper One named top-rated all-foam mattress, Consumer Reports
- 2025 – Snow Max named top-rated hybrid mattress, Consumer Reports
- 2025 – Casper Snow, Dream, and Dream Max named top-rated hybrid mattresses, Consumer Reports
- 2025 – Casper Hybrid mattresses highly rated in durability, Consumer Reports

In 2025, the Dream Max and Snow Max earned endorsements from the American Chiropractic Association.

The company has been recognized for its marketing strategies, including a wide-ranging New York City Subway campaign, the "Dreamery” mobile nap experience, and the "Sleepers" campaign in which the brand hired professional sleepers.

== Retail Presence ==
Casper products are sold through a combination of owned retail stores and third-party retailers. As of 2025, the company operates over 40 Casper retail stores located in major U.S. cities including New York, Los Angeles, Miami, Houston, and Chicago.

In addition to its direct-to-consumer website, Casper products are available at major retailers including Target, Amazon, and Costco.

The brand also partners with select wholesalers and showrooms nationwide.
