= Economic impact of the COVID-19 pandemic =

The COVID-19 pandemic caused far-reaching economic consequences including the COVID-19 recession, the second largest global recession in recent history, decreased business in the services sector during the COVID-19 lockdowns, the 2020 stock market crash (which included the largest single-week stock market decline since the 2008 financial crisis), the impact of COVID-19 on financial markets, the 2021–2023 global supply chain crisis, the 2021–2023 inflation surge, shortages related to the COVID-19 pandemic including the 2020–2023 global chip shortage, panic buying, and price gouging. The pandemic led to governments providing an unprecedented amount of stimulus, and was also a factor in the 2021–2022 global energy crisis and 2022–2023 food crises.

The pandemic affected worldwide economic activity, resulting in a 7% drop in global commercial commerce in 2020. Several demand and supply mismatches caused by the pandemic resurfaced throughout the recovery period in 2021 and 2022 and were spread internationally through trade. During the first wave of the COVID-19 pandemic, businesses lost 25% of their revenue and 11% of their workforce, with contact-intensive sectors and SMEs being particularly heavily impacted. However, considerable policy assistance helped to avert large-scale bankruptcies, with just 4% of enterprises declaring for insolvency or permanently shutting at the time of the COVID-19 wave. According to a 2021 global modeling study, the travel and tourism sector alone could contribute to a worldwide GDP loss of up to US$12.8 trillion if the pandemic extended through the end of 2020. The study further predicted over 500 million global job losses in related industries, highlighting tourism as one of the most severely impacted sectors.

Amidst the recovery and containment, the world economic system was characterized as experiencing significant, broad uncertainty. Economic forecasts and consensus among macroeconomics experts show significant disagreement on the overall extent, long-term effects and projected recovery. A large general increase in prices was attributed to the pandemic. In part, the record-high energy prices were driven by a global surge in demand as the world quit the economic recession caused by COVID-19, particularly due to strong energy demand in Asia.

== Overall economic contraction ==
In 2020 global stock markets experienced their worst crash since 1987, and in the first three months of 2020 the G20 economies fell 3.4% year-on-year. Between April and June 2020, the International Labour Organization estimated that an equivalent of 400 million full-time jobs were lost across the world, and income earned by workers globally fell 10 percent in the first nine months of 2020, equivalent to a loss of over US$3.5 trillion. In May 2020, Cambridge University estimated the cost to the global economy at $3.3 trillion to $82 trillion over five years, and in mid 2020 the UN estimated the cost to be $8.5 trillion over two years. A retrospective economic analysis from late 2023 places the cost between $17 trillion and $35 trillion over five years. When the COVID-19 pandemic hit Europe, much of Europe's investment had been high, but it had unexpectedly slowed. In 2019, overall investment in the European Union increased by about 3% over the previous year, surpassing growth in real GDP.

Investment, like other economic activity, fell drastically as a direct result of lockdown restrictions. This effect was particularly noticeable in the second quarter of 2020, when investment decreased 19% year on year, as most limitations were relaxed by the summer. In 2019, firms already had an unfavourable assessment of the economic situation. Overall expectations for sector-specific business prospects, as well as the availability of internal and external funding, deteriorated in the course of 2020. In the European Investment Bank Investment report 2020–21, 81% of the respondents cited uncertainty as the most severe obstacle to investment. 20% of EU companies anticipate a permanent loss in employment, indicating that a sizable proportion of firms are pessimistic about their capacity to "bounce back" once the COVID-19 crisis has passed.

As a result of the pandemic, half of European companies anticipate an increase in the usage of digital technologies in the future. The proportion is considerably greater among companies that have previously used digital technology.

The European Union's public debt exceeded 95% of GDP by the end of 2021, a 15 percentage point rise since the pandemic began in 2019.

From the first to the second quarter of 2020, the EU government debt grew by 8.4 percentage points to 88% of GDP. According to the European Commission, debt to GDP reached 94% by the end of 2020. In autumn 2020, a second wave of infection and lockdowns aggravated the problem.

After one year of the COVID-19 crisis, corporate investment was expected to decline by at least 25%.

The International Monetary Fund (IMF) and other organizations predicted that the European Union's GDP would contract by 6% to 8%, a drop unprecedented since the Great Depression.

The European Union's total real GDP fall was more than 11% compared to the first quarter of 2020, the biggest drop in a single quarter on record.

The reduction in GDP was caused by government attempts to restrict the virus's spread, and it varied greatly between Member States. It was weakest, on average, in Central and Eastern Europe, where real GDP decreased 9.7% in the second quarter compared to the first. It decreased by 11.5% in Western and Northern Europe, and by roughly 15% in Southern Europe. In comparison, real GDP in the United States fell by nearly 9% in the second quarter compared to the first quarter.

In the second quarter of 2020, disposable income per capita decreased dramatically, affecting consumer expenditure, particularly for lower-income families.

The impact of the COVID-19 varied greatly on the industry. Sectors that rely heavily on physical presence, including passenger transportation, the arts, entertainment, tourism, and hospitality, were impacted the worst, with declines of up to 30% in the second quarter of 2020 compared to the first quarter. Industries such as agriculture, banking, and real estate, declined by 3% or less during the same time span. During the 2008 financial crisis, the distribution of economic effect across sectors was extremely varied, with EU manufacturing suffering the worst decrease – over 20% in the first quarter of 2009. The decrease in other sectors was relatively limited, at around or below 6%.

GDP per hour in the EU grew by 0.3 percent in the second quarter of 2020 compared to the same time in 2019, while GDP per employee decreased 11.5%. Access to capital is seen as a barrier by about 55% of businesses. Credit limitations are especially difficult for SMEs and new businesses to overcome. Credit constraints affect 24% of SMEs and 27% of young businesses.

More than two-fifths of businesses (44%) did not experience a year-on-year sales loss as a result of COVID-19 at the time of the European Investment Bank's investment survey, and more than half predicted stronger sales in 2022 than before the pandemic.

In Western and Northern Europe, as well as Central and Eastern Europe, the unemployment rate climbed by roughly 0.5 percentage point. The rise was greater in Southern Europe (1.5 percentage points). The United States increased by 4 percentage points during the same period, reaching a high of 10 percentage points in April in 2021.

44% of enterprises in Central, Eastern and Southeastern European countries incurred losses in 2020 and/or 2021, and 10% did not anticipate to recover from pandemic-era economic losses in 2022. 60% of CESEE enterprises received some type of financial assistance in response to COVID-19, which is the same as the EU average. This was largely in the form of subsidies or other types of non-repayable financial assistance. Only around one out of every ten businesses reports that they are still receiving financial assistance in 2023.

All sectors received support during the COVID-19 crisis, primarily through subsidies. In 2022, energy-intensive Industries had the highest share of firms (22%) still receiving support. Energy-intensive industries and renewables saw the strongest recovery post-pandemic, with sales increased by 76% and 72%, from 2020 to 2021. Other sectors in the EU also experienced significant turnover growth post-COVID-19.

In Europe, the hardest hit sector by the COVID-19 pandemic was electronics, due to semiconductor shortages. The construction sector was most directly impacted by the Russian invasion of Ukraine rather than the pandemic. The digital sector was overall least affected by trade disruptions from COVID-19.

=== Economic recovery programmes ===
Nations, cities and other collectives with governance mechanisms worldwide have announced the development and implementation of programmes for guided economic recovery. Some economic recovery programmes include Next Generation EU and Pandemic Emergency Purchase Programme.

Pandemic Emergency Purchase Programme (PEPP)

The Pandemic Emergency Purchase Programme (PEPP) was a monetary policy initiative launched by the European Central Bank (ECB) in March 2020 to mitigate the economic impact of the COVID-19 pandemic. Its primary goals were to maintain price stability, ensure favourable financing conditions across the eurozone, and safeguard the transmission of monetary policy during a period of severe economic disruption. The PEPP allowed the ECB to purchase private and public sector securities flexibly, complementing existing asset purchase programs while addressing the unique challenges posed by the pandemic. The high ability for flexibility in the design of the program is noted as a strategy to keep up with the shifting economic dynamics caused by the global pandemic.

==== Implementation ====
The PEPP began with a fund of €750 billion similar to the Next Generation EU fund.The Governing Council decided to increase the initial €750 billion envelope for the PEPP by €600 billion on 4 June 2020 and by €500 billion on 10 December 2020, to a new total of €1.85 trillion. A total allocation of €1.85 trillion was dedicated to asset purchases under the program, over its duration of two years. Pandemic emergency purchase programme (PEPP). Pandemic emergency purchase programme (PEPP). Notably, the ECB was permitted to deviate from its traditional capital key rule, which ties purchases to member states' GDP and population, allowing more flexibility in responding to crisis conditions. The program included purchases of government bonds, corporate bonds, and securities issued by European institutions. Purchases first began in March 2020.

==== Effectiveness ====
The PEPP was initially effective in stabilizing financial markets during the pandemic, reducing borrowing costs for governments and corporations while supporting credit flows. Its flexible approach was particularly beneficial for countries such as Greece, which faced heightened debt challenges. By mitigating market fragmentation and ensuring liquidity, the PEPP helped to maintain financial stability across the eurozone. Through the duration of the program, there was a shift from market stability, to fighting inflation. Early evaluations highlighted its role in containing sovereign yield spreads and providing a buffer against the economic downturn. The program was designed to continue until EU governments determined that the COVID-19 period of economic crisis subsided. With this, the EU Governing Council ceased purchases in March 2022, giving the program a two-year active run.

==== Post-Pandemic Impact ====
By maintaining low borrowing costs, it supported fiscal policies aimed at addressing the crisis's long-term effects. However, challenges emerged, including balancing inflationary pressures and addressing disparities in recovery rates across member states. Analysts have noted that while the program provided significant short-term relief, its long-term impact on structural economic issues remains uncertain.

Next Generation EU (NGEU)

The Next Generation EU (NGEU) was a €750 billion economic recovery plan launched by the European Union in July 2020 in response to the economic challenges posed by the COVID-19 pandemic. It aimed to mitigate the pandemic's immediate economic impacts and lay the groundwork for long-term recovery through investments in green energy, digital transformation, public health, and economic resilience. The program marked a significant moment in EU history, as it was the first large-scale recovery initiative financed through joint borrowing by member states, signaling deeper fiscal integration within the union.

Components of the NGEU included:

- The Recovery and Resilience Facility (RRF): Allocated €672.5 billion to fund reforms and investments by EU member states, focusing on sustainability.
- ReactEU: Aimed at addressing immediate recovery needs, particularly in employment and healthcare, through €50.6 billion in additional funding. The NGEU funds were distributed to member states based on the severity of the pandemic's economic effects, with countries like Italy, Spain, and Greece receiving substantial allocations. The program required recipients to submit recovery and resilience plans outlining specific projects and reforms tied to the EU's green and digital priorities.

By mid-2022, the European Commission had approved most member states' plans, disbursing billions in grants and loans. The NGEU played a significant role in stabilizing the European economy during the pandemic by supporting investments in clean energy, digital infrastructure, and workforce upskilling. Italy, for example, focused on energy efficiency and broadband expansion, while Spain prioritized renewable energy and social inclusion projects.

The NGEU was credited with bolstering economic growth in the EU post-pandemic. Analysts estimate that the initiative added between 1–2 percentage points to GDP growth in member states during its peak implementation phase (2021–2023). Additionally, the program contributed to long-term stability by addressing structural issues such as regional inequalities and fostering cross-border cooperation on sustainability goals.

As of 2024, the NGEU remains active, with funding allocated through the EU's Multiannual Financial Framework (MFF) for 2021–2027. The Recovery and Resilience Facility continues to oversee the implementation of member states' projects, though its disbursements are now primarily focused on monitoring progress and ensuring compliance with pre-approved plans. The program has become a model for potential future EU-wide fiscal policies. It is noted that Next Generation EU will focus spending on development of sustainable energies and technologies continuing through the end of the program in 2027.

=== Environment ===
A study published in August 2020 concluded that the direct effect of the response to the pandemic on global warming will likely be negligible and that a well-designed economic recovery could avoid future warming of 0.3 °C by 2050. The study indicates that systemic change for decarbonization of humanity's economic structures is required for a substantial impact on global warming, which also has economic aspects. Beyond targeted financing of green projects or sectors, contemporary decision-making mechanisms also allow for excluding projects with substantial environmental, social, or climate risks from financial relief. Over 260 civil society organizations called on Chinese actors to ensure that COVID-19 related Belt and Road Initiative funding excludes such projects. In November 2020 the IMF said that governments and central banks had promised $19.5 trillion of support since the coronavirus began.

The United Nations Environment Programme analyzed $14.6 trillion of global spending in 2020, and found that only 2.5% was directed towards tackling climate change, advising governments to "make use of recovery spending to steer away from the worst impacts of climate change and inequality". A 2022 analysis of G20 country spending found that about 6% of their pandemic recovery spending has been allocated to areas that will also cut greenhouse-gas emissions, including electrifying vehicles, making buildings more energy efficient and installing renewables.

The IMF estimates that, in September, G20 governments committed some $15 trillion in fiscal resources: $7 trillion in direct budget support and an additional $8 trillion in public sector borrowing and capital injections into corporations. This $15 trillion represented almost 14 percent of global GDP.

== Agriculture and food ==
During the COVID-19 pandemic, food insecurity intensified in many places. In the second quarter of 2020, there were multiple warnings of famine later in the year. In an early report, the Nongovernmental Organization (NGO) Oxfam-International talks about "economic devastation" while the lead-author of the UNU-WIDER report compared COVID-19 to a "poverty tsunami". Others talk about "complete destitution", "unprecedented crisis", "natural disaster", "threat of catastrophic global famine". The decision of the WHO on 11 March 2020, to qualify COVID as a pandemic, that is "an epidemic occurring worldwide, or over a very wide area, crossing international boundaries and usually affecting a large number of people" also contributed to building this global-scale disaster narrative.

Field evidence collected in more than 60 countries in the course of 2020 indicate, however, that while some disruptions (affecting the stability of the global food system) were reported at local (hoarding) and international (restrictions on exports) levels, those took place primarily during the early days/weeks of the pandemic (and the subsequent waves of lockdowns) and did not lead to any major episode of "global famine", thus invalidating the catastrophic scenario that some experts had initially conjectured.

In September 2020, David Beasley, executive director of the World Food Programme, addressed the United Nations Security Council, stating that measures taken by donor countries over the course of the preceding five months, including the provision of $17 trillion in fiscal stimulus and central bank support, the suspension of debt repayments instituted by the IMF and G20 countries for the benefit of poorer countries, and donor support for WFP programmes, had averted impending famine, helping 270 million people at risk of starvation. As the pandemic-incited food issues began to subside, the 2022 Russian invasion of Ukraine triggered another global food crises compounding already extreme price increases.

=== 2022 food crisis ===
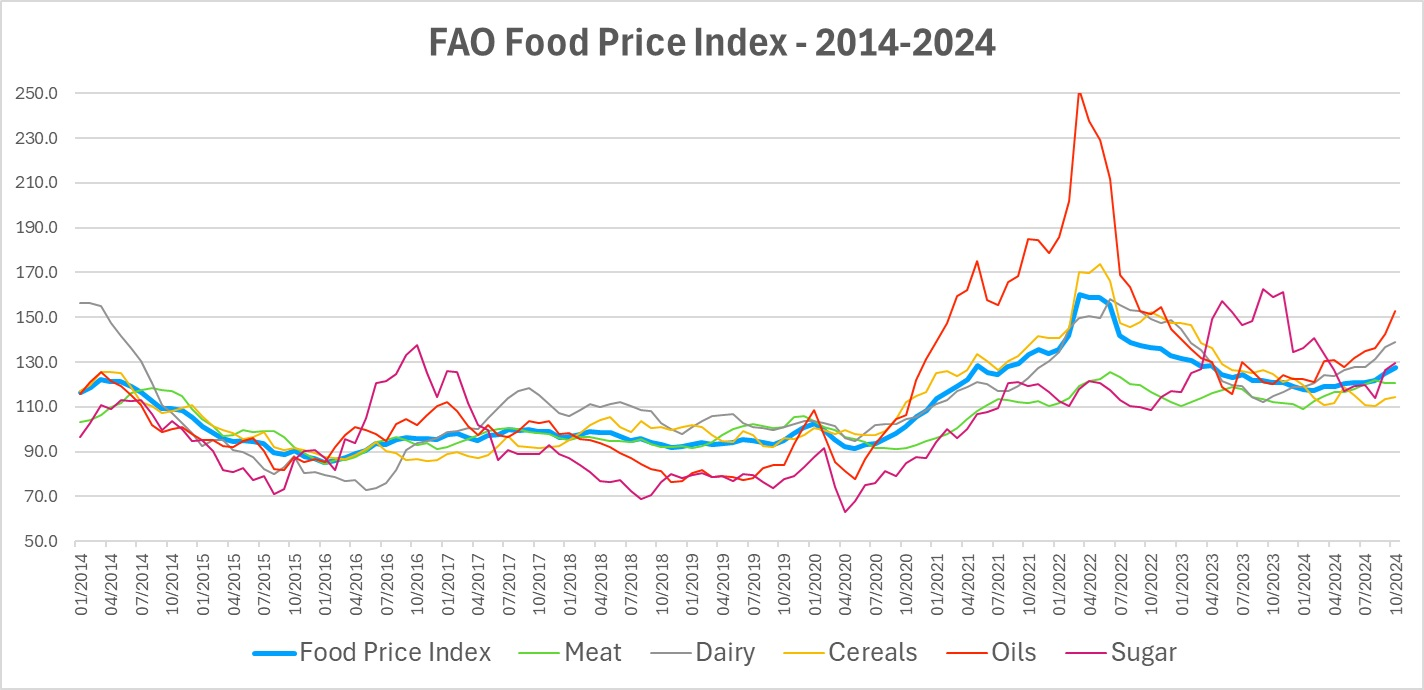
Food Price Index with 5 major commodities groups – 2014–2024 Food Price Index Meat Dairy Cereals Oils Sugar

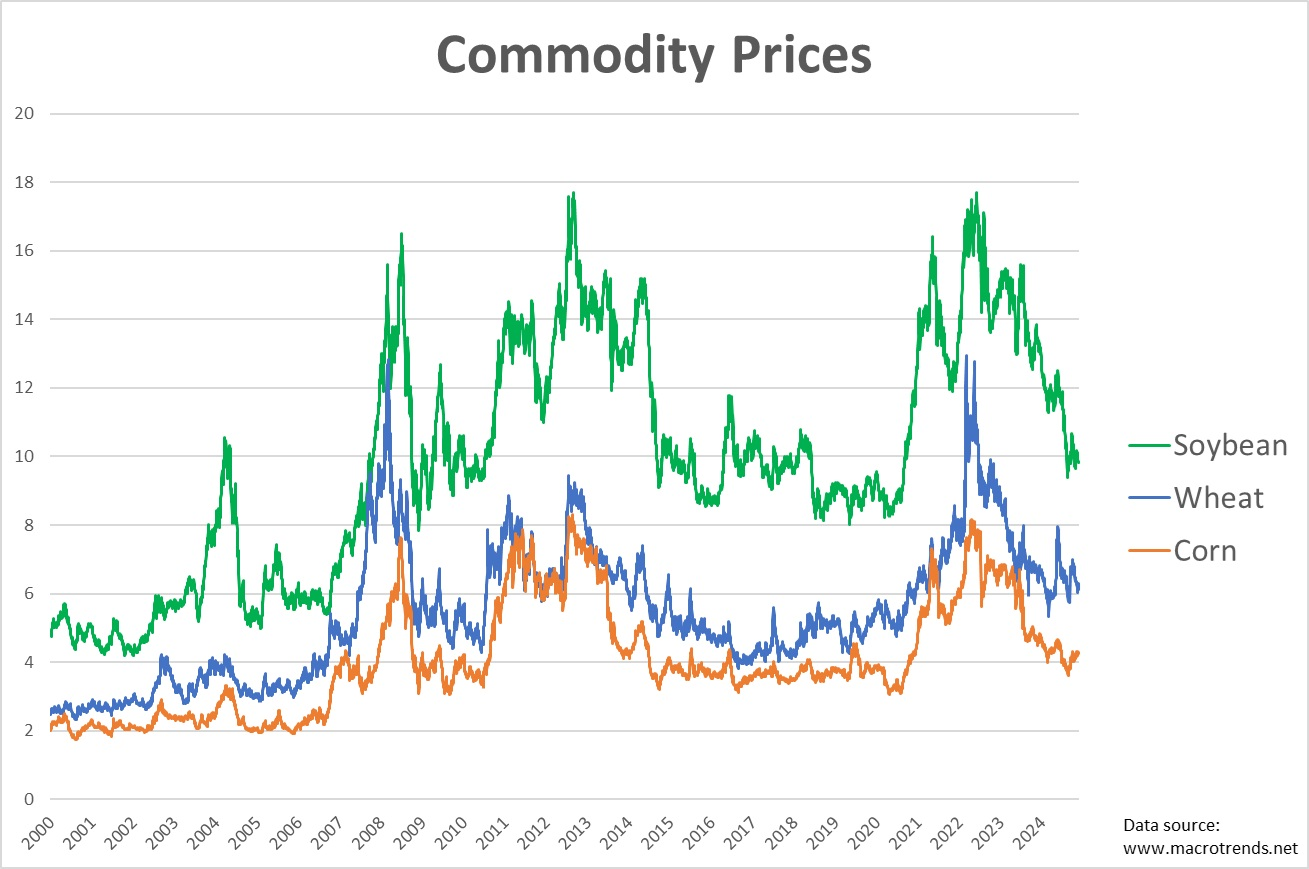
Prices of soybean, wheat and corn – 2000–2024 Soybeans Wheat Maize

During 2022 and 2023 there were food crises in several regions as indicated by rising food prices. In 2022, the world experienced significant food price inflation along with major food shortages in several regions. Sub-Saharan Africa, Iran, Sri Lanka, Sudan and Iraq were most affected. Prices of wheat, maize, oil seeds, bread, pasta, flour, cooking oil, sugar, eggs, chickpeas and meat increased. Many factors contributed to the world food crisis. These include supply chain disruptions due to the COVID-19 pandemic, the Global energy crisis (2021–2023), the Russian invasion of Ukraine, and floods and heatwaves during 2021 (which destroyed key American and European crops). Droughts were also a factor; in early 2022, some areas of Spain and Portugal lost 60–80% of their crops due to widespread drought.

Even before the Russian invasion of Ukraine, food prices were already at a record high. 82 million East Africans and 42 million West Africans faced acute food insecurity in 2021. By the end of 2022, more than 8 million Somalis were in need of food assistance. In February 2022, the Food and Agriculture Organization (FAO) reported a 20% rise in food prices since February 2021. The war further pushed this increase to 40% in March 2022 but was reduced to 18% by January 2023. But the FAO warned that inflation of food prices would continue in many countries.

Increased fuel and transport prices have made food distribution worse and more complex. Before the Russian invasion, Ukraine was the fourth-largest exporter of maize and wheat. Since then, the Russian invasion crippled supplies. This resulted in inflation and scarcity of these commodities in dependent countries. Global food reserves have also decreased due to the effects of climate change on agriculture.

This caused food riots and famine in different countries. Furthermore, China acquired 51% of the world supply of wheat, 60% of rice, and 69% of maize stockpiles in the first half of 2022. The United States increased its farm production by April 2022, also contributing $215 million in development assistance plus $320 million for the Horn of Africa. A grain agreement was signed by Russia, Ukraine, Turkey and the United Nations to open Ukrainian ports. This resulted in grain shipment by 27 vessels from Ukraine between June and August 2022 which stalled in October and then resumed in November 2022. In addition, the World Bank announced a new $12 billion fund to address the food crises.

The World Economic Forum's Global Risks Report 2023 described food supply crises as a global risk. The Russian invasion of Ukraine and crop failures from climate change worsened worldwide hunger and malnutrition. Even Global North countries known for stable food supplies were impacted. Analysts described this food inflation as the worst since the 2007–2008 world food price crisis. However, in early 2024, the FAO reported a return to more moderate commodities market prices. Moreover, the World Economic Forum's 2024 Global Risks Report showed significantly less concern from experts but the report still highlighted a risk of the Gaza war and the return of El Niño. Both of these events could disrupt supply chains again.

== Financial markets ==
Viewed in context, the price of oil has been affected internationally at the times of the COVID-19 pandemic, the 2022– Russo-Ukrainian war and the 2026 Iran war.

Economic turmoil associated with the coronavirus pandemic has wide-ranging and severe impacts upon financial markets, including stock, bond and commodity (including crude oil and gold) markets. Major events included the Russia–Saudi Arabia oil price war that resulted in a collapse of crude oil prices and a stock market crash in March 2020. The United Nations Development Programme expects a US$220 billion reduction in revenue in developing countries, and expects COVID-19's economic impact to last for months or even years. Some expect natural gas prices to fall.

During the early phase of COVID in April and May, there was a significant correlation between the extent of the outbreak and volatility in financial and stock markets. The broader effects of this volatility impacted credit markets, and save for government interventions and central banks pursuing quantitative easing, would have led to more significant economic downturns.

== Manufacturing ==
See also 2020–2023 global chip shortage.

=== 2021 car production crisis ===
US vehicle prices surged during the COVID-19 pandemic, but then stabilized somewhat.

New vehicle sales in the United States declined by 40% in March 2020. The American Big Three shut down their US factories. The German automotive industry came into the crisis after having already suffered from the Dieselgate-scandal, as well as competition from electric cars. Boeing and Airbus suspended production at some factories. A survey conducted by the British Plastics Federation (BPF) explored how COVID-19 is impacting manufacturing businesses in the United Kingdom (UK). Over 80% of respondents anticipated a decline in turnover over the next 2 quarters, with 98% admitting concern about the negative impact of the pandemic on business operations. In July 2021, car production in the United Kingdom hit its lowest level since 1956.

== Arts, entertainment and sport ==
The epidemic had a sudden and substantial impact on the arts and cultural heritage (GLAM) sectors worldwide. The global health crisis and the uncertainty resulting from it profoundly affected the sector. By March 2020, across the world most cultural institutions had been indefinitely closed (or at least with their services radically curtailed) exhibitions, events and performances cancelled or postponed. Many individuals temporarily or permanently lost contracts or employment with varying degrees of warning and financial assistance available. Equally, financial stimulus from governments and charities for artists, have provided greatly differing levels of support, depending on the sector and the country. In countries such as Australia, where the arts contributed to about 6.4% of GDP, effects on individuals and the economy have been significant.

=== Cinema ===
Ticket sales revenue has declined since the mid-2010s, not fully recovering from declines during the COVID-19 pandemic when many theaters were closed.

The pandemic has impacted the film industry. Across the world and to varying degrees, cinemas have been closed, festivals have been cancelled or postponed, and film releases have been moved to future dates. As cinemas closed, the global box office dropped by billions of dollars, while streaming became more popular and the stock of Netflix rose; the stock of film exhibitors dropped dramatically. Almost all blockbusters to be released after the March opening weekend were postponed or cancelled around the world, with film productions also halted. Massive losses in the industry have been predicted.

=== Sport ===
Most major sporting events were cancelled or postponed, including the 2020 Summer Olympics in Tokyo, which were postponed on 24 March 2020 until 2021.

=== Television ===
The COVID-19 pandemic has shut down or delayed production of television programs in several countries. However, a joint report from Apptopia and Braze showed a 30.7% increase in streaming sessions worldwide on platforms such as Disney+, Netflix, and Hulu during the month of March.

=== Video games ===
As the outbreak appeared in China first, supply chains affected the manufacturing and production of some video game consoles, delaying their releases and making current supplies scarcer. As the outbreak and pandemic spread, several keystone trade events, including E3 2020, were cancelled over concerns of further spread. The economic impact on the video game sector is not expected to be as large as in film or other entertainment sectors as much of the work in video game production can be decentralised and performed remotely, and products distributed digitally to consumers regardless of various national and regional lockdowns on businesses and services.

== Medicine ==
The pandemic led to a boom in plastic surgery.

== Publishing ==
The pandemic is predicted to have a dire effect on local newspapers in the United States, where many were already severely struggling beforehand.

In light of the public health situation in which includes afflicted regions where retail sectors deemed non-essential have been ordered closed for the interim, Diamond Comic Distributors announced on 24 March 2020 a full suspension of distributing published material and related merchandise as 1 April 2020 until further notice. As Diamond has a near-monopoly on printed comic book distribution, this is described as an "extinction-level event" that threatens to drive the entire specialized comic book retail sector out of business with that one move. As a result, publishers like IDW Publishing and Dark Horse Comics have suspended publication of their periodicals while DC Comics is exploring distribution alternatives including an increased focus on online retail of digital material.

Total US book sales went down by 8.4% in March 2020 compared to March 2019 after the stay-at-home orders were implemented, with bookstore sales dropping by an estimated 33%. By June 2020, demand began to recover with the exception of educational material and bookstore sales, with most sales going to Amazon and big-box stores, who were open since they were considered essential businesses. Books that were initially supposed to be published in spring and early summer were delayed until fall, with the expectation that the pandemic would be over by then. Two of the major printing companies, Quad and LSC Communications, faced financial issues into the latter half of the year as the latter declared bankruptcy during a rise in demand. Increased sales were attributed to major book releases and increased demand for children's books and books about race and racism. This created supply chain bottleneck at the printing process for most publishers. According to NPD BookScan, print sales went up almost 8% in 2020.

== Retail ==
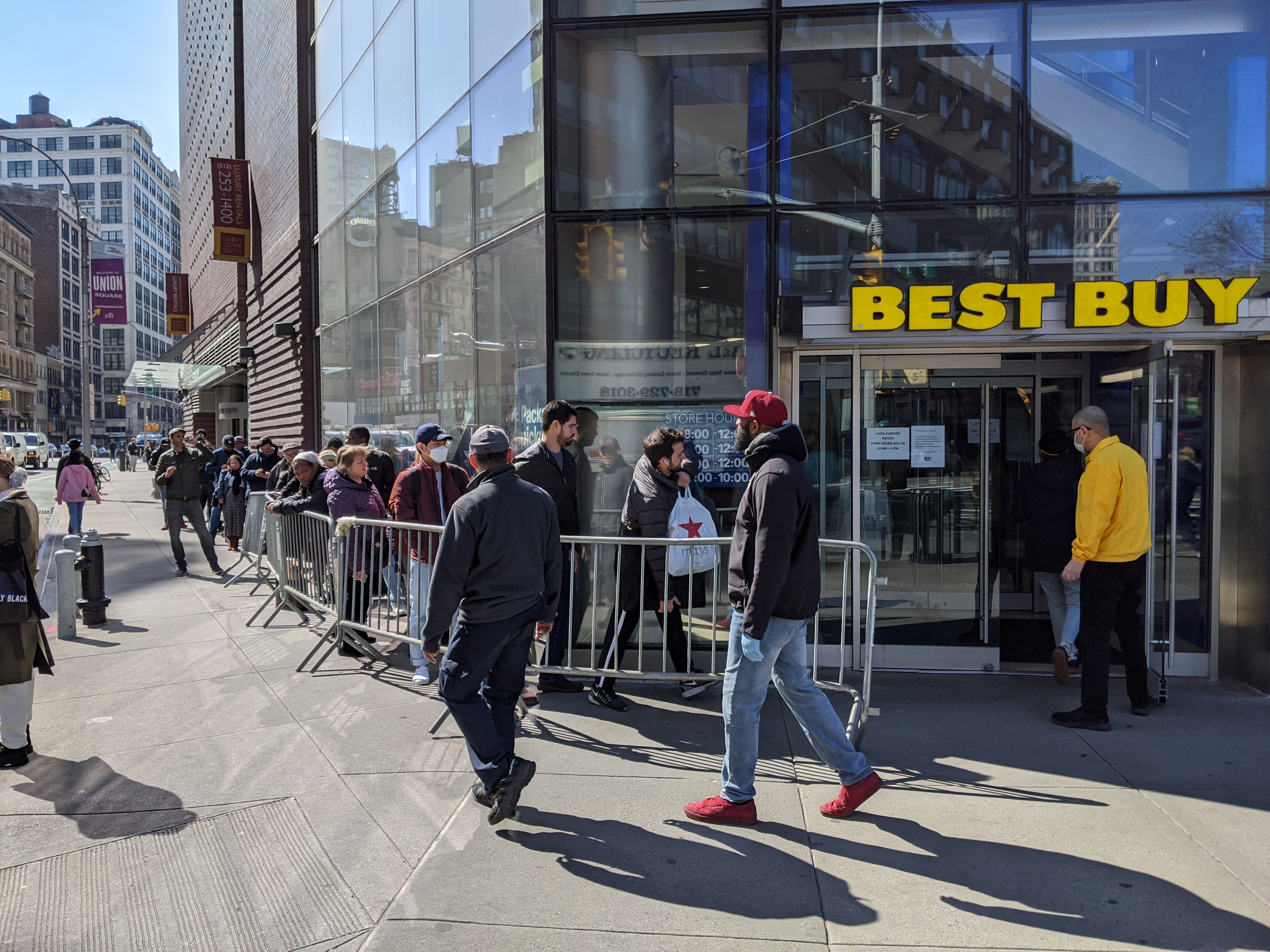
Best Buy was only letting a limited number of people into their Union Square store in New York City, 18 March 2020

The pandemic has impacted the retail sector. Shopping centres around the world responded by reducing hours or closing down temporarily. As of 18 March 2020, the footfall to shopping centres fell by up to 30%, with significant impact in every continent. Additionally, product demand exceeded supply for many consumables, resulting in empty retail shelves. In Australia, the pandemic has provided a new opportunity for daigou shoppers to re-sell into the China market. "The virus crisis, while frightening, has a silver lining".

Some retailers have employed contactless home delivery or curbside pickup for items purchased through e-commerce sites. By April, retailers had started implementing "retail to go" models where consumers could pick up their orders. An estimated 40% of shoppers were shopping online and choosing to pick up in-store, a behavior that had suddenly doubled as compared to the previous year.

Small-scale farmers have been embracing digital technologies as a way to directly sell produce, and community-supported agriculture and direct-sell delivery systems are on the rise.

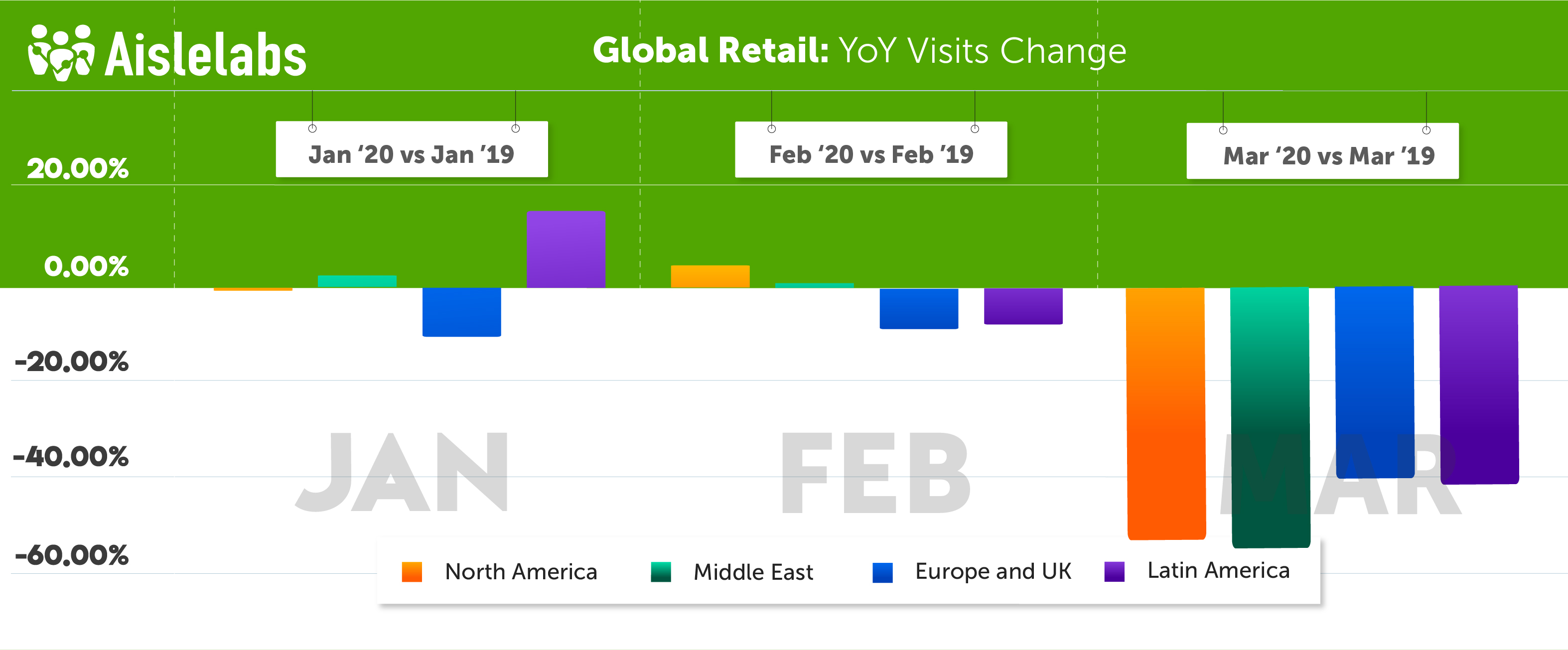
Retail suffered 40–60% drop in footfall in Mar 2020

In mid-April, Amazon confirmed that workers at over half of its 110 U.S. warehouses had been diagnosed with coronavirus.

On 16 June, the United States Department of Commerce announced that retail sales for the month of May had seen an increase of 17.7% from April as states began to reopen and lift restrictions. According to CNBC, This marks the biggest one month jump in the history of retailing in the United States. Numbers for June reflected a 7.5 percent rise in sales.

=== Business closures ===
By April, department store retailers JCPenney, Nordstrom, Macy's and Kohl's had lost $12.3 billion combined in market caps. Neiman Marcus and JCPenney defaulted on bond payments in April, preparing internally for bankruptcy court and bankruptcy protection. J.Crew and Neiman Marcus filed for bankruptcy during the first week of May; they were reportedly the first two major retailers to do so during the pandemic. JCPenney filed for bankruptcy on 15 May.

In May, Pier 1 announced it would close as soon as possible. It had sought court protection in February and had hoped that someone would buy the business, but the subsequent recession made this seem unlikely.

In early 2021, Family Video announced all their remaining stores would be liquidated and closed down.

== E-commerce ==
The pandemic boosted e-commerce sales. With more people staying at home, both by choice as well as through government lockdowns, there was a decline in brick-and-mortar shopping. On the other hand, e-commerce surged 34% during 2020, and in 2021 surpassed levels not expected until 2025, projected to reach $843 billion in the US in 2021.

Despite persistent cross-country differences, the COVID crisis has enhanced dynamism within the e-commerce landscape across countries and has dilated the scope of e-commerce, as well as through new firms, client segments (e.g. elderly) and product (e.g. groceries).

The pandemic has created a shift in the manner shoppers behave and perform their activities, directly moving the e-commerce industry so the prosperity of e-commerce during pandemic lockdown has increased significantly.

The impact of the epidemic on transportation and production has affected e-commerce. Customers would consider whether goods can be shipped on time and delivered on time, and these factors would affect their choices. Under the current epidemic conditions, some online sellers, taking advantage of the characteristics of e-commerce, are defrauding consumers. The problems and flaws exposed by these e-merchants in the epidemic situation further push e-merchants towards a more mature and regulated path.

Social media and proprietary e-commerce websites emerged as the fastest-growing sales channels following the onset of the COVID-19 crisis.

Global e-commerce sales are expected to reach $6.5 trillion by 2023, up from $3.5 trillion in 2019.

== Restaurant sector ==
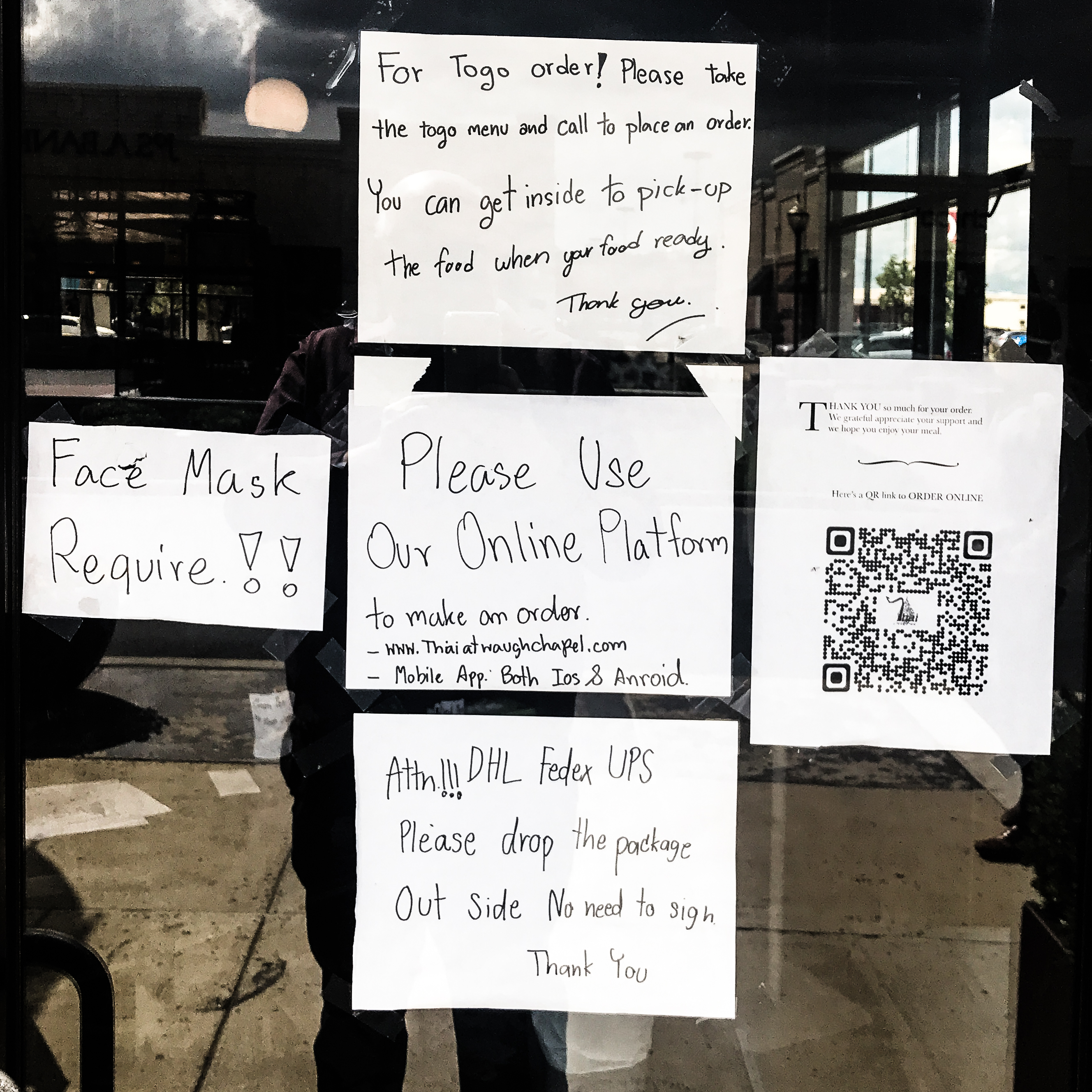
Signs on a Thai Restaurant in Crofton, Maryland

The pandemic has impacted the restaurant business. In the beginning of March 2020, some major cities in the US announced that bars and restaurants would be closed to sit-down dinners and limited to takeout orders and delivery. Later in the month, many states put in place restrictions that required restaurants to be takeout or delivery only. Some employees were fired, and more employees lacked sick leave in the sector compared to similar sectors. With only carry-out and delivery services, most servers and bartenders were laid off, prompting these employees creating "virtual tip jars" across 23 U.S. cities. In the United States, an initiative known as the "Great American Takeout" called on people under quarantine to support local restaurants each Tuesday by ordering takeout for curbside pickup or using food delivery services. It began in late March 2020.

== Science and technology ==
The pandemic impacted productivity of science, space and technology projects. Space agencies including NASA and the European Space Agency halted production of the Space Launch System, James Webb Space Telescope, and put space science probes into hibernation or low power mode and shifted to remote work.

A large number of tech workers have been laid off starting in 2023; excessive hiring during the pandemic has been cited as one reason for the job cuts, along with increased interest rates and reduced demand from consumers.

== Tourism ==
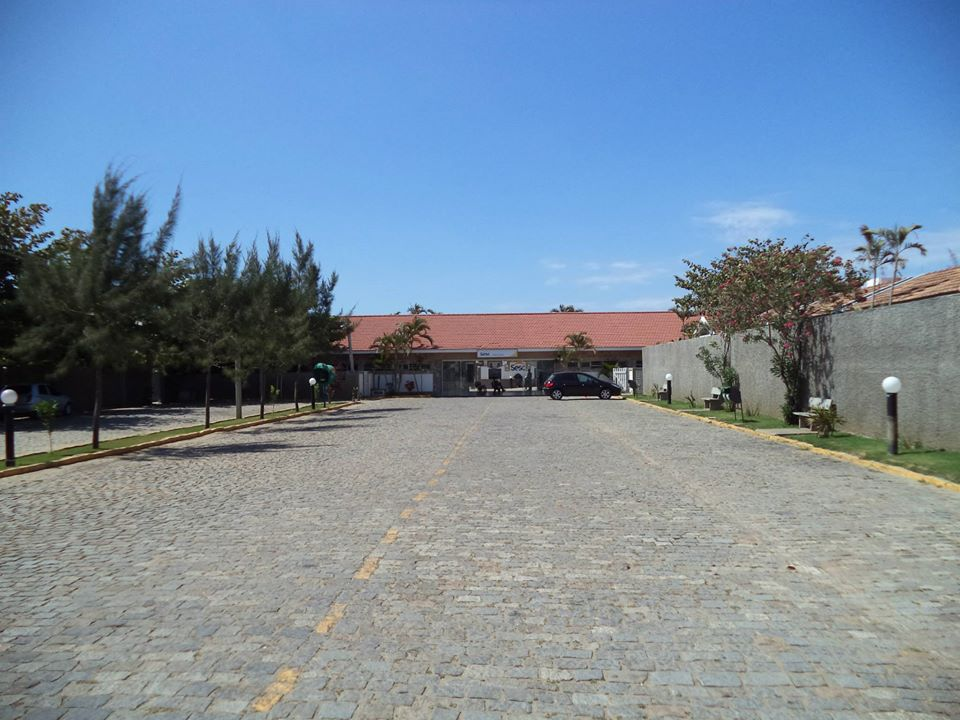
A branch of SESC Hotels in São João da Barra, Brazil, closed due to the pandemic.

Philia Tounta summarised likely effects of COVID-19 on global tourism early in March 2020:

- severe effects because tourism depends on travel
- quarantine restrictions
- fear of airports and other places of mass gathering
- fears of illness abroad
- issues with cross-border medical insurance
- tourism enterprise bankruptcies
- tourism industry unemployment
- airfare cost increases
- damage to the image of the cruise industry

== Events and institutions ==
The pandemic has caused the cancellation or postponement of major events around the world. Some public venues and institutions have closed.

== Transportation ==
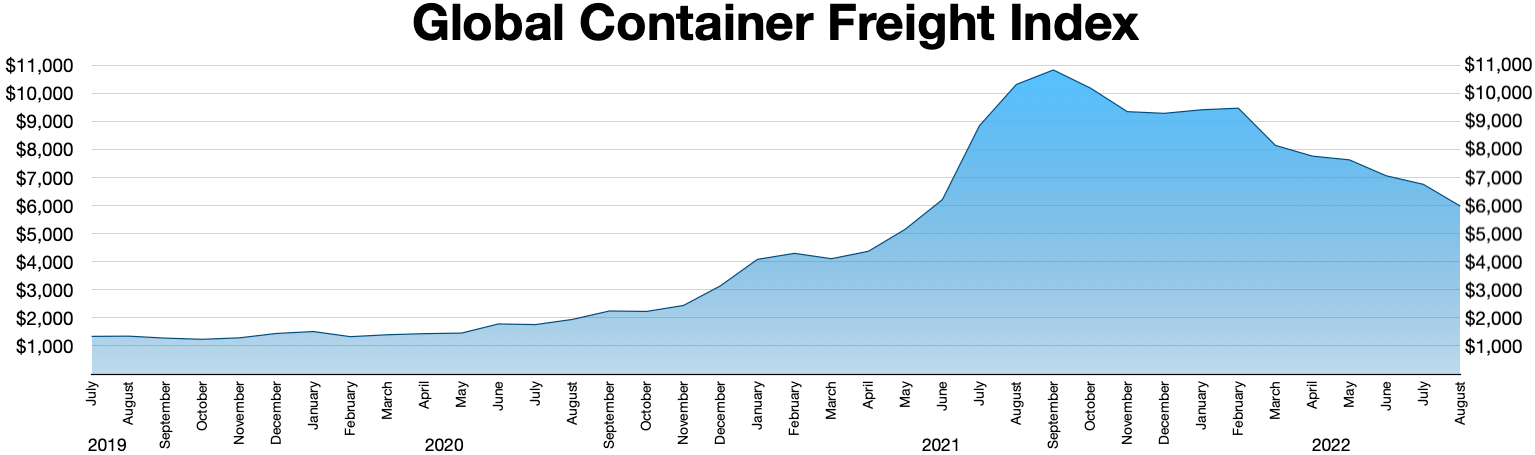
Global Container Freight Index July 2019 – December 2021

Staffing issues caused transportation bottlenecks in trucking and at ports in developed countries. Supply problems and sudden demand for socially distanced recreation and alternatives to public transport caused a shortage of bicycles in the United States.

The cruise ship industry has also been heavily affected by a downturn, with the share prices of the major cruise lines down 70–80%.

In many of the world's cities, planned travel went down by 80–90%.

=== Aviation ===
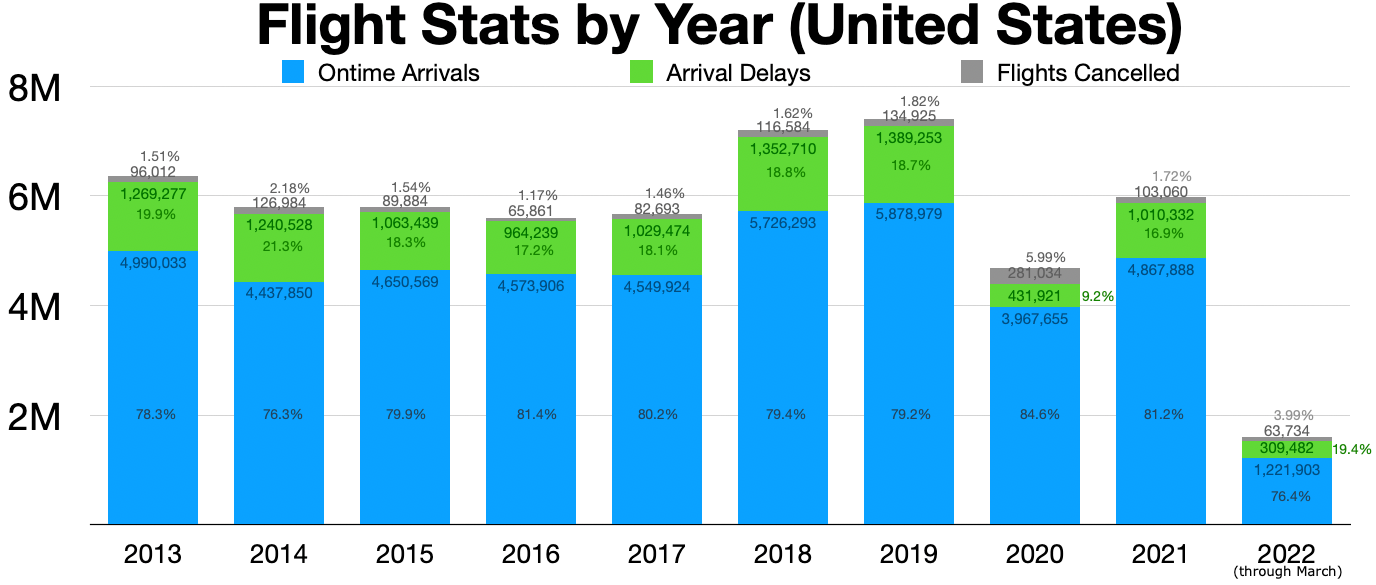
Flight stats by year
Flight cancellations
Flight delays
On-time Arrivals

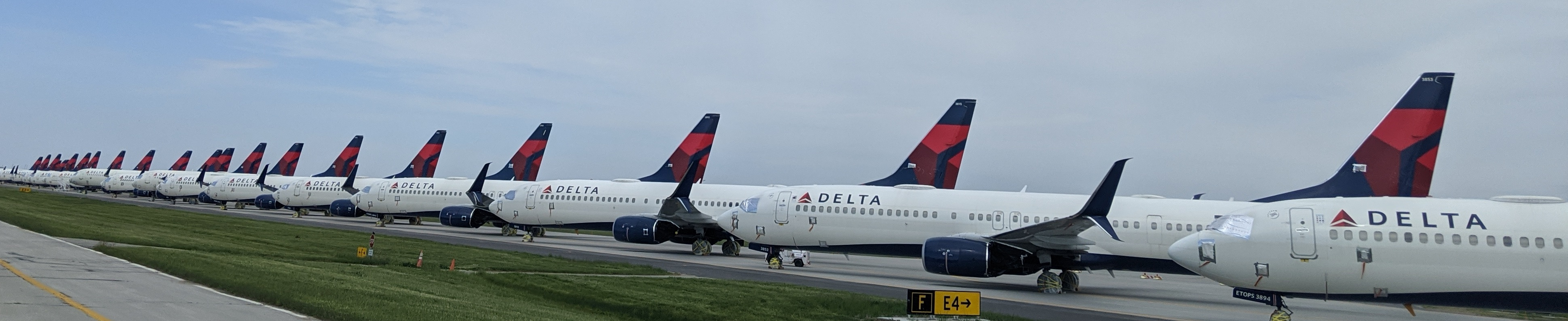
Delta Air Lines planes parked on a taxiway at Kansas City International Airport. The planes are parked due to the sharp decrease in demand for air travel.

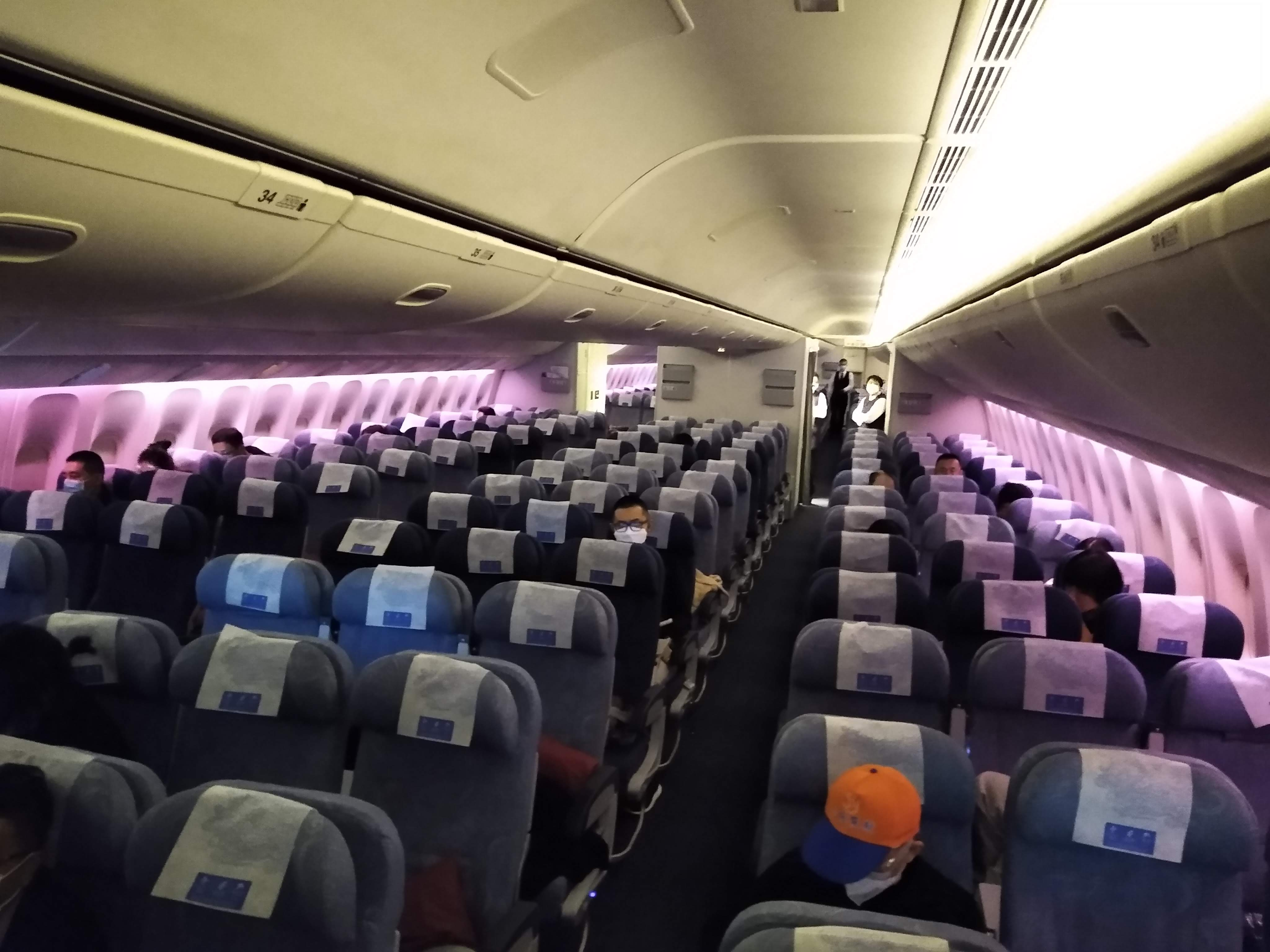
A nearly empty flight from Beijing to Los Angeles during the pandemic

The pandemic has had a significant impact on the aviation industry due to the resulting travel restrictions as well as a slump in demand among travellers. Significant reductions in passenger numbers have resulted in planes flying empty between airports and the cancellation of flights.

United States passenger airlines can expect about $50 billion in subsidies from the Coronavirus Aid, Relief, and Economic Security Act.

=== Cruise lines ===
Industries such as cruising experienced a significant decline—down to levels not seen in thirty years.

Cruise lines had to cancel sailings after the outbreak of the COVID-19 pandemic. Bookings and cancellations grew as extensive media coverage of ill passengers on quarantined ships hurt the industry's image.

Shares of cruise lines fell sharply in value on 27 March 2020 when the $2 trillion Coronavirus Aid, Relief, and Economic Security Act excluded companies that are not "organized" under United States law. Senator Sheldon Whitehouse (D-RI) tweeted: "The giant cruise companies incorporate overseas to dodge US taxes, flag vessels overseas to avoid US taxes and laws, and pollute without offset. Why should we bail them out?" Senator Josh Hawley (R-MO) tweeted that cruise lines should register and pay taxes in the United States if they expect a financial bailout. U.S-based employees and small, American-owned companies are eligible for financial assistance.

=== Railways ===
Several rail operators had to receive state aid and/or reduced their scheduled services. Deutsche Bahn received billions of € in federal aid to cover record losses.

== Gambling and betting ==
According to the American Gaming Association, the industry would be hit by losses up to $43.5 billion in economic activity in the following months. Some projection was that the sports gambling industry may lose $140 million alone in the fourth weekend of March (21–22 March 2020) on lost NCAA basketball tournament bets. Gambling companies are eager to shift customers from retail into online casino and poker games to fight the loss of revenue due to the cancellation of sports fixtures and the shutdown of betting shops. Gambling groups increased the advertising of online casino games and play on social media. Some argue that virtual racing, as well as draw based games, are also proving popular. Some software betting providers have specially designed campaigns promoting online betting solutions to attract betting companies. Long term consequences to the betting and gambling industry might be: Death of small retail operators and providers, increase in M&A, more focus on online, innovation in online meaning that even the existing products like the sportsbook would pay closer attention to obscure sports like soap soccer or quidditch and more prominent spot for virtual games online.

In Macau, the world's top gambling destination by revenue, all casinos were closed for 15 days in February 2020 and suffered a year-on-year revenue drop of 88%, the worst ever recorded in the territory.

== Unemployment ==
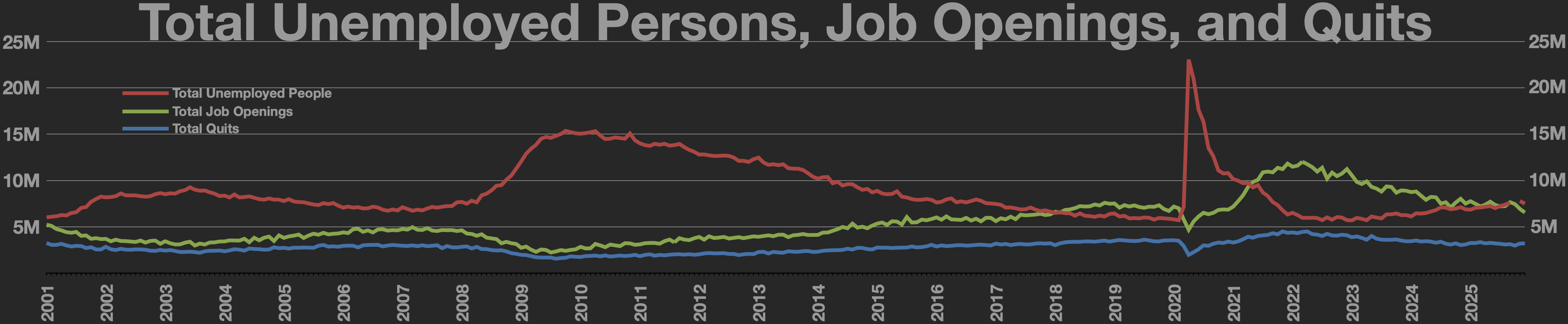
Total unemployed people Total job openings Total quits

The COVID-19 pandemic has demonstrated the interconnectedness of a diverse world. [...] Already at a disadvantage pre-pandemic, women, ethnic minorities, indigenous and tribal peoples, young people, persons with disabilities and migrant workers are among those who have been hardest hit.

— Guy Ryder, Director-General of the International Labour Organization

The International Labour Organization stated on 7 April that it predicted a 6.7% loss of job hours globally in the second quarter of 2020, equivalent to 195 million full-time jobs. They also estimated that 30 million jobs were lost in the first quarter alone, compared to 25 million during the Great Recession. The effects of COVID-19 on unemployment lasted much longer than was initially expecting. Almost 18 months after the start of the pandemic, the state of New York was still down almost a quarter of the jobs that were available in the hospitality industry pre-pandemic. This was the largest percent in any state in the United States, but other states still faced a similar issue.

In January and February 2020, during the height of the epidemic in Wuhan, about 5 million people in China lost their jobs. Many of China's nearly 300 million rural migrant workers have been stranded at home in inland provinces or trapped in Hubei province.

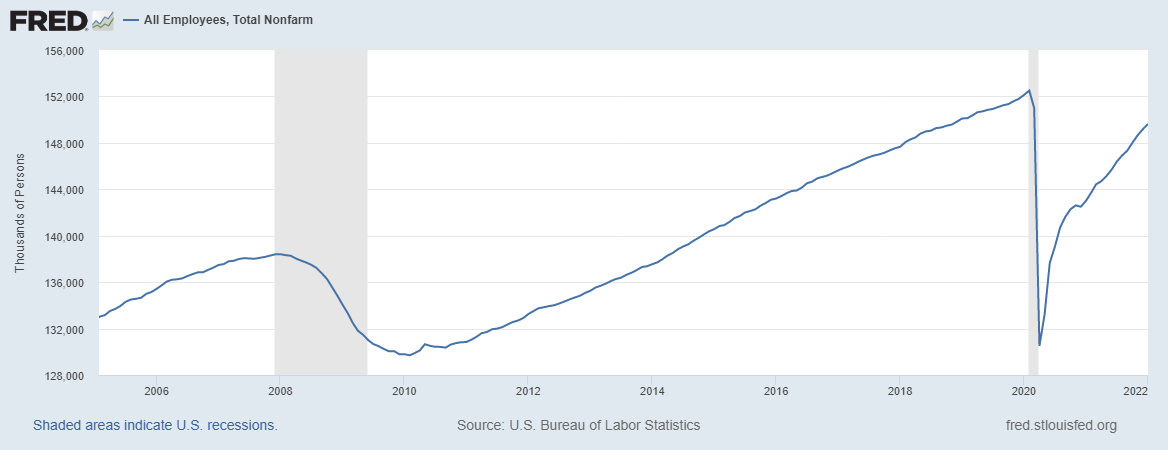
US non-farm payrolls, 2005 – January 2022

In March 2020, more than 10 million Americans lost their jobs and applied for government aid. Total nonfarm jobs fell from a high of 152.5 million in February 2020 to 130.2 million in April. As of February 2021, the US had about 143 million nonfarm jobs.

The lockdown in India has left tens of millions of migrant workers unemployed.

The survey from the Angus Reid Institute found that 44% of Canadian households have experienced some type of job loss.

Nearly 900,000 workers lost their jobs in Spain since it went into lockdown in mid-March 2020. During the second half of March, 4 million French workers applied for temporary unemployment benefits and 1 million British workers applied for a universal credit scheme.

Almost half a million companies in Germany have sent their workers on a government-subsidized short-time working schemes known as Kurzarbeit. The German short-time work compensation scheme has been copied by France and Britain.

The pandemic's economic impacts are likely to increase sexual exploitation and child marriage, leaving women and girls in fragile economies and refugee contexts particularly vulnerable.

The potential combined impact of COVID-19 on unemployment, households’ purchasing power, food prices, and food availability in local markets could severely jeopardize access to food in the most vulnerable countries.

== Impact by gender ==
Around the world, women generally earn less and save less, are the majority of single-parent households and disproportionately hold more insecure jobs in the informal economy or service sector with less access to social protections. This leaves them less able to absorb the economic shocks than men. For many families, school closures and social distancing measures have increased the unpaid care and domestic load of women at home, making them less able to take on or balance paid work. The situation is worse in developing economies, where a larger share of people are employed in the informal economy in which there are far fewer social protections for health insurance, paid sick leave and more. Although globally informal employment is a greater source of employment for men (63 per cent) than for women (58 per cent), in low and lower-middle income countries a higher proportion of women are in informal employment than men. Unlike previous crisis', the COVID-19 pandemic affected more women dominated industries rather than male dominated industries: women were in the forefront in the fight against COVID-19 as most healthcare workers are women.

In Sub-Saharan Africa, for example, around 92 per cent of employed women are in informal employment compared to 86 per cent of men. It is likely that the pandemic could result in a prolonged dip in women's incomes and labour force participation. The ILO estimates global unemployment to rise between 5.3 million ("low" scenario) and 24.7 million ("high" scenario) from a base level of 188 million in 2019 as a result of COVID-19's impact on global GDP growth. By comparison, global unemployment went up by 22 million during the Great Recession. Women informal workers, migrants, youth and the world's poorest, among other vulnerable groups, are more susceptible to lay-offs and job cuts. For example, UN Women survey results from Asia and the Pacific are showing that women are losing their livelihoods faster than men and have fewer alternatives to generate income. And, in the U.S., men's unemployment went up from 3.55 million in February to 11 million in April in 2020 while women's unemployment – which was lower than men's before the crisis – went up from 2.7 million to 11.5 million over the same period, according to the U.S. Bureau of Labor Statistics. The picture is even bleaker for young women and men aged 16–19, whose unemployment rate jumped from 11.5 per cent in February to 32.2 per cent in April.

In Japan, women have been disproportionately hit by the Covid pandemic because sectors like retail and hospitality employ many women and have been heavily affected by the pandemic recession. According to the health ministry, the suicide rate among Japanese women rose 14.5% in 2020, while it fell by 1% among men.

== Economic inequality ==
Since most of the workforce who preserved their jobs had the option of switching to an online modality, and the online workforce is considerably higher paid on average, the pandemic exacerbated income inequality by hitting harder on low-paid workers.

Additionally, the global rise in extreme poverty rates during the pandemic further compounded these issues of economic inequality. According to the March 2024 update from the Poverty and Inequality Platform (PIP), the global extreme poverty rate increased from 8.9% in 2019 to 9.7% in 2020, marking the first rise in decades. This increase was largely due to significant job losses and reduced income among the lowest earners, particularly in regions like South Asia where extreme poverty rose by 2.4 percentage points. Although some regions experienced a decline in poverty due to effective fiscal policies, such as in Brazil, the overall global trend indicates a widening gap between the economically vulnerable and those able to maintain or enhance their financial stability during the pandemic.

== Economic impact by continent, region and country ==
Fiscal responses to the COVID-19 pandemic

A weekly update on the impact of the COVID-19 pandemic on the world economy, and on major individual economies such as the US, China, Japan, other Asian economies, Europe, Australia and New Zealand has been produced by Saul Eslake, one of Australia's best-known economists, since late April 2020.

The global GDP total had shrunk by nearly $22 trillion as of January 2021, during the course of the pandemic. According to Chief IMF Economist Gita Gopinath, the long-term consequences have not fully played out but could be expected to be in the trillions from 2020 to 2025.

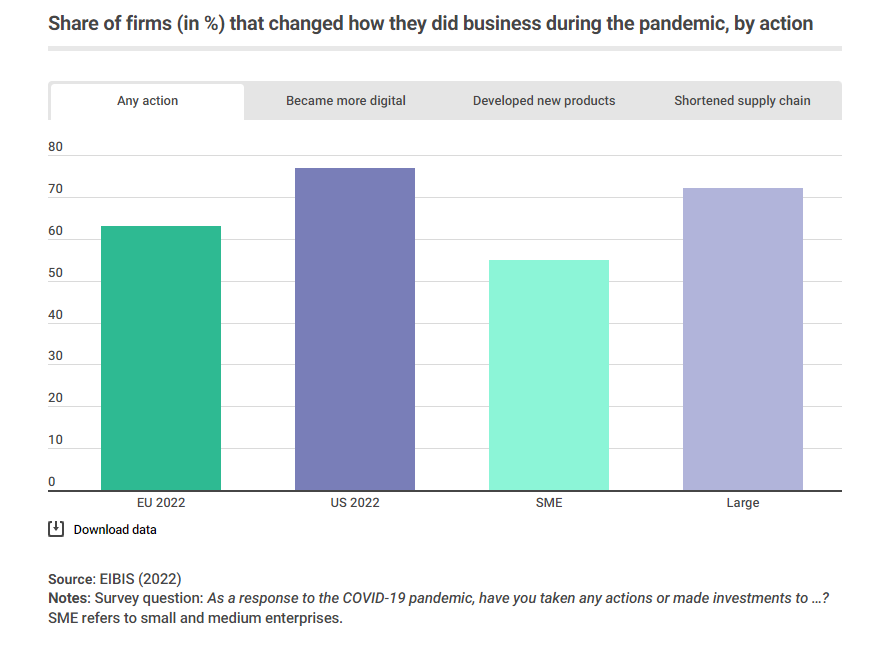
Share of firms that changed how they did business during the COVID-19 pandemic.

Post-COVID economic recovery prospects are high, and most countries are expected to see higher than usual economic growth. This is different from conventional economic recessions, according to the IMF. The China, India, ASEAN nations and other emerging Asian economies are expected to continue growing most significantly throughout the 2020s, and is expected to dominate global economic growth following the pandemic.

=== Asia ===
==== East Asia ====
===== Mainland China =====
The economy of China was anticipated to generate billions in economic output. Morgan Stanley expected the economy of China to grow by between 5.6% (worst-case scenario) to 5.9% for 2020. For reference, China generated US$143 billion in February 2019, the month of Chinese New Year. The Chinese Ministry of Transport reported that trips on trains dropped 73% to 190 million trips from the previous year. Factories, retailers, and restaurant chains closed.

All 70,000 theatre screens in the country were shuttered, wiping out the entire box office. This is drastically in stark difference from the week of Chinese New Year in 2019 that generated $836 million.

Though cautioning that the economic impact would be short-term, PRC National Development and Reform Commission party secretary Cong Liang views small and medium businesses encountering more difficulties in their operations. Human Resources and Social Security Assistant Minister You Jun specified that agricultural workers and college graduates would have difficulties.

Animated map showing confirmed COVID-19 cases spreading from 22 January (high resolution)

Tourism in China has been hit hard by travel restrictions and fears of contagion, including a ban on both domestic and international tour groups. Many airlines have either cancelled or greatly reduced flights to China and several travel advisories now warn against travel to China. Many countries, including France, Japan, Australia, New Zealand, the United Kingdom and the United States, have evacuated their nationals from the Wuhan and Hubei provinces.

The majority of schools and universities have extended their annual holidays to mid-February. Overseas students enrolled at Chinese universities have been returning home over fears of being infected.

The Finance Ministry of China announced it would fully subsidise personal medical costs incurred by patients.

CNN reported that some people from Wuhan "have become outcasts in their own country, shunned by hotels, neighbors and – in some areas – placed under controversial quarantine measures."

The sale of new cars in China has been affected due to the outbreak. There was a 92% reduction on the volume of cars sold during the first two weeks of February 2020.

On 24 February, China's Standing Committee declared an immediate and "comprehensive" ban on its US$74 billion wildlife trade industry, citing the "prominent problem of excessive consumption of wild animals, and the huge hidden dangers to public health and safety" that has been revealed by the outbreak. This permanently extends the temporary ban already in place since the end of January.

According to Carbon Brief, the coronavirus pandemic has resulted in China's greenhouse gas emissions being reduced by 25%. In March 2020, satellite images from space provided by NASA revealed that pollution has dropped significantly, which has been attributed in part to the slowdown of economic activity as a result of the outbreak.

====== Shortages of medical supplies ======
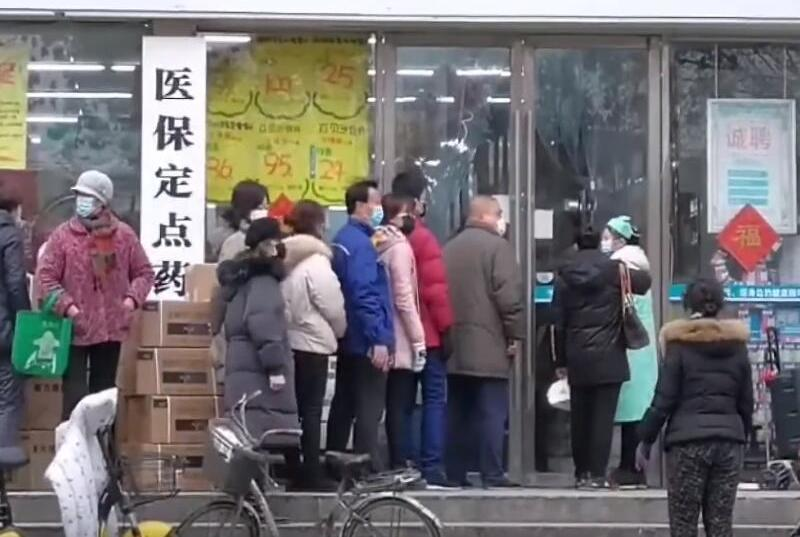
People in Wuhan lining up in front of a drug store to buy surgical masks

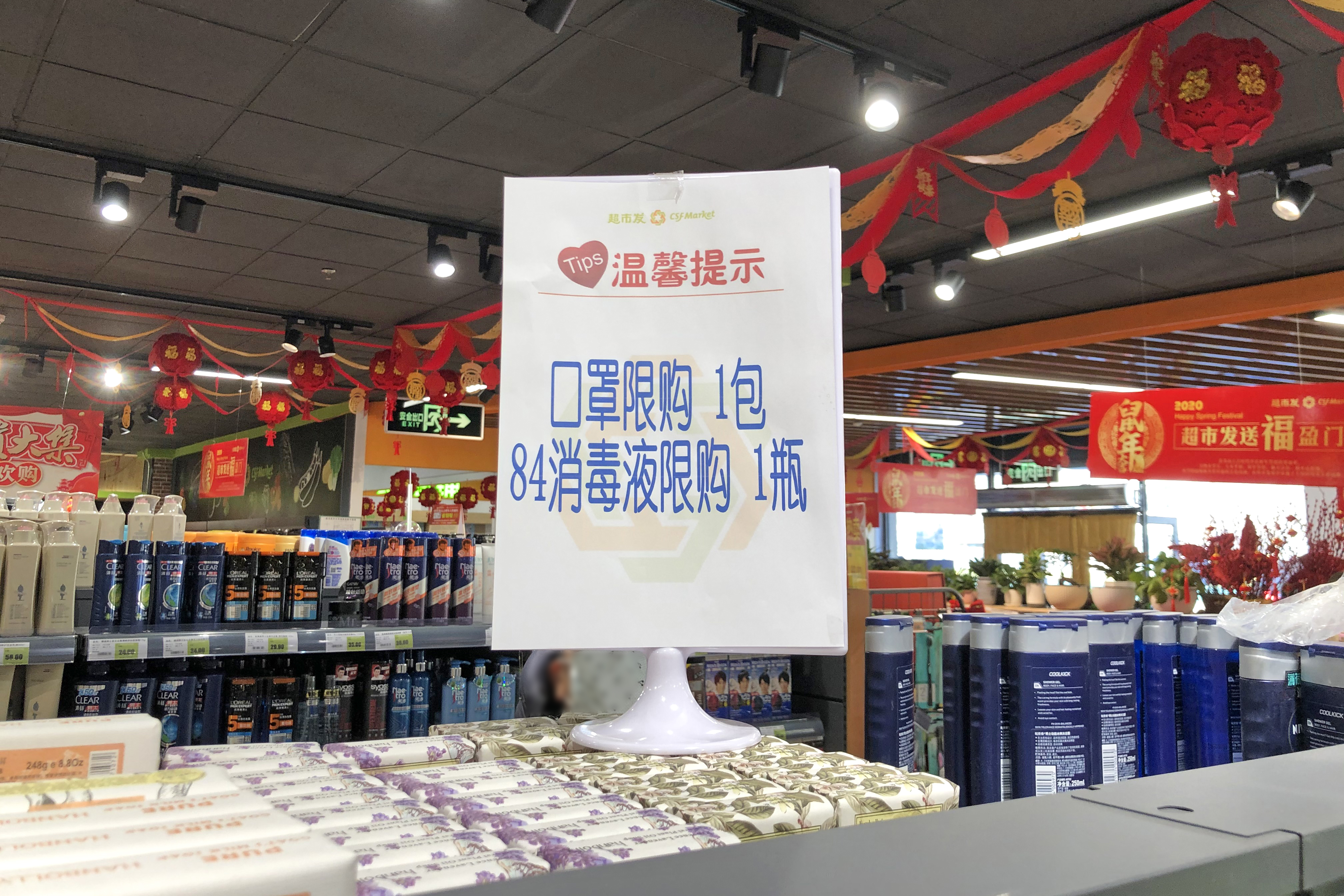
A notice at a supermarket in Beijing, which says each person can only buy one pack of surgical masks and one bottle of 84 disinfectant liquid a day

As the epidemic accelerated, the mainland market saw a shortage of face masks due to the increased need from the public. It was reported that Shanghai customers had to queue for nearly an hour to buy a pack of face masks which was sold out in another half an hour. Some stores hoarded supplies, driving up prices, so the market regulator cracked down on such acts. The shortage would not be relieved until late February, when most workers return from the New Year vacation, according to Lei Limin, an expert in the industry.

On 22 January 2020, Taobao, China's largest e-commerce platform owned by Alibaba Group, said that all face masks on Taobao and Tmall would not be allowed to increase in price. Special subsidies would be provided to the retailers. Also, Alibaba Health's "urgent drug delivery" service would not be closed during the Spring Festival. JD, another leading Chinese e-commerce platform, said, "We are actively working to ensure supply and price stability from sources, storage and distribution, platform control and so on" and "while fully ensuring price stability for JD's own commodities, JD.com has also exercised strict control over the commodities on JD's platform. Third-party vendors selling face masks are prohibited from raising prices. Once it is confirmed that the prices of third-party vendors have increased abnormally, JD would immediately remove the offending commodities from shelves and deal with the offending vendors accordingly." Other major e-commerce platforms including Sunning.com and Pinduoduo also promised to keep the prices of health products stable.

====== Economy ======
China's economic growth is expected to slow by up to 1.1% in the first half of 2020 as economic activity is negatively affected by the new coronavirus pandemic, according to a Morgan Stanley study cited by Reuters. But on 1 February 2020, the People's Bank of China said that the impact of the epidemic on China's economy was temporary and that the fundamentals of China's long-term positive and high-quality growth remained unchanged. In late January, economists predicted a V-shaped recovery. By March, it was much more uncertain.

Due to the outbreak, the Shanghai Stock Exchange and the Shenzhen Stock Exchange announced that with the approval of the China Securities Regulatory Commission, the closing time for the Spring Festival would be extended to 2 February and trading would resume on 3 February. Before that, on 23 January, the last trading day of a shares before the Spring Festival, all three major stock indexes opened lower, creating a drop of about 3%, and the Shanghai Composite Index fell below 3000. On 2 February, the first trading day after the holiday, the three major indexes even set a record low opening of about 8%. By the end of the day, the decline narrowed slightly to about 7%, the Shenzhen index fell below 10,000 points, a total of 3,177 stocks in the two markets fell.

The People's Bank of China and the State Administration of Foreign Exchange have announced that the inter-bank Renminbi foreign exchange market, the foreign currency-to-market and the foreign currency market would extend their holiday closed until 2 February 2020. When the market opened on 3 February, the Renminbi was now depreciating against major foreign currencies. The central parity rate of the Renminbi against the US dollar opened at 6.9249, a drop of 373 basis points from the previous trading day. It fell below the 7.00 than an hour after the opening, and closed at 7.0257.

The World Bank expects China to grow by just 0.1–2.3%, the lowest growth rate in decades.

On 22 May, Chinese Premier Li Keqiang announced that, for the first time in history, the central government wouldn't set an economic growth target for 2020, with the economy having contracted by 6.8% compared to 2019 and China facing an "unpredictable" time. However, the government also stated an intention to create 9 million new urban jobs until the end of 2020.

In October 2020, it was announced that China's third-quarter GDP has grown with 4.9%, hereby missing analysts expectations (which was set at 5,2%). However, it does show that China's economy has indeed been steadily recovering from the coronavirus shock that caused decades-low growth. To fuel economic growth, the country set aside hundreds of billions of dollars for major infrastructure projects and used population tracking policies and enforced the stringent lockdown to contain the virus. It is the only major economy that is expected to grow in 2020, according to the International Monetary Fund.

By December 2020, China's economic recovery was accelerating amid increasing demand for manufactured goods. The UK-based Centre for Economics and Business Research projected that China's "skilful management of the pandemic" would cause the Chinese economy to surpass the United States and become the world's largest economy by nominal GDP in 2028, five years sooner than previously expected.

===== Hong Kong =====
Hong Kong has seen high-profile protests that saw tourist arrivals from mainland China plummet over an eight-month period. The viral epidemic put additional pressure on the travel sector to withstand a prolonged period of downturn. A drop in arrivals from third countries more resilient during the previous months has also been cited as a concern. The city is already in recession and Moody has lowered the city's credit rating.

Since the outbreak of the virus, a significant number of products have been sold out across the city, including face masks and disinfectant products (such as alcohol and bleach). An ongoing period of panic buying has also caused many stores to be cleared of non-medical products such as bottled water, vegetables and rice. The Government of Hong Kong had its imports of face masks cancelled as global face mask stockpiles decline.

In view of the coronavirus pandemic, the Education Bureau closed all schools.

On 5 February, flag carrier Cathay Pacific requested its 27,000 employees to voluntarily take three weeks of unpaid leave by the end of June. The airline had previously reduced flights to mainland China by 90% and to overall flights by 30%.

===== Macau =====
On 4 February 2020, all casinos in Macau were ordered shut down for 15 days. All casinos reopened on 20 February 2020, but visitor numbers remained low due to the pandemic, with hotels at less than 12% occupancy at the end of February.

===== Japan =====
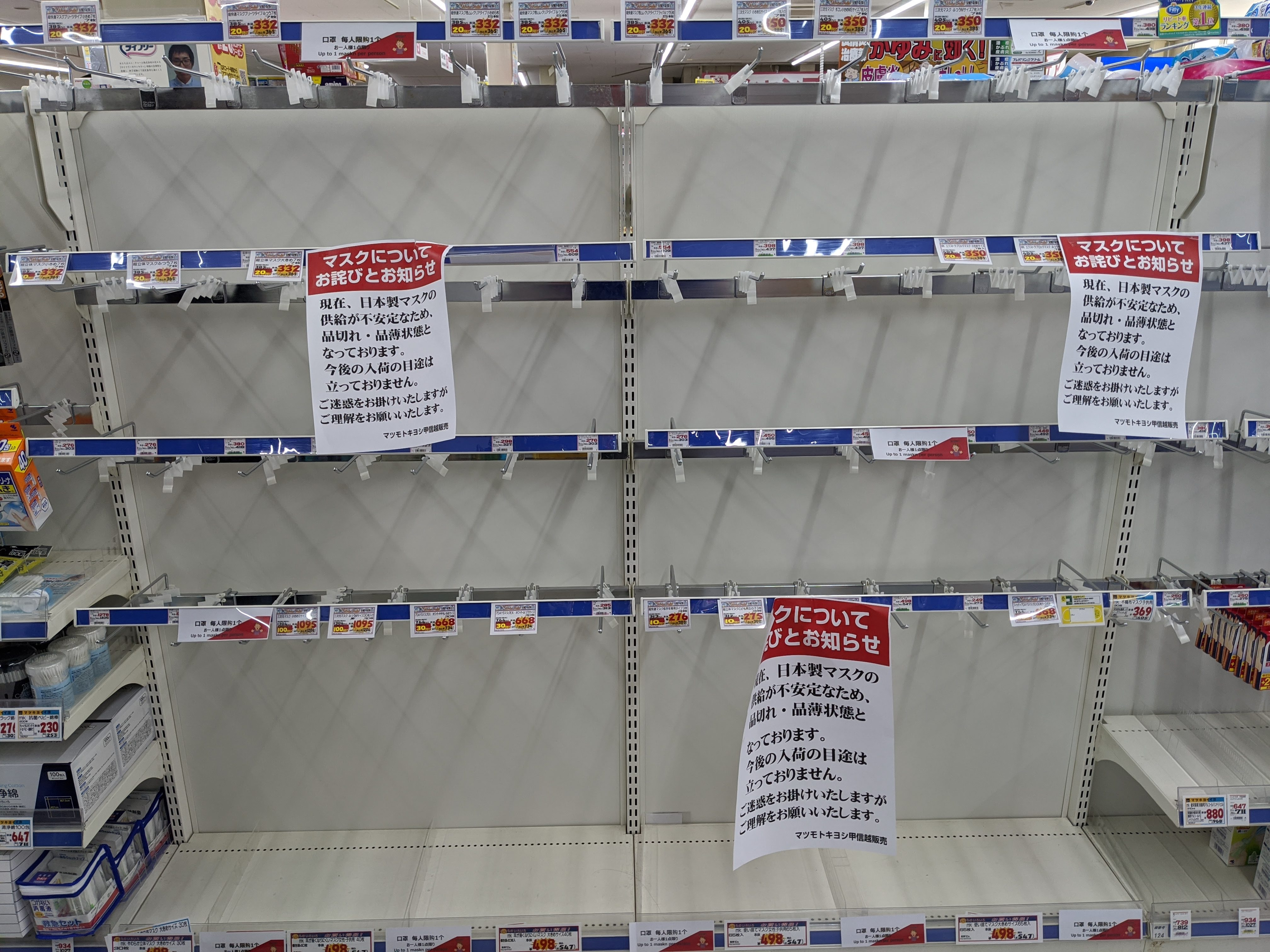
Shelves in a pharmacy in Japan sold out of masks on 3 February 2020

Former Prime Minister Shinzō Abe has said that "the new coronavirus is having a major impact on tourism, the economy and our society as a whole". Face masks have sold out across the nation and stocks of face masks are depleted within a day of new arrivals. There has been pressure placed on the healthcare system as demands for medical checkups increase. Chinese people have reported increasing discrimination. The health minister has pointed out that the situation has not reached a point where mass gatherings must be called off 1 February 2020.

Aviation, retail and tourism sectors have reported decreased sales and some manufactures have complained about disruption to Chinese factories, logistics and supply chains. Prime Minister Abe has considered using emergency funds to mitigate the outbreak's impact on tourism, of which Chinese nationals account for 40%. S&P Global noted that the worst hit shares were from companies spanning travel, cosmetics and retail sectors which are most exposed to Chinese tourism. Nintendo announced that they would delay shipment of the Nintendo Switch, which is manufactured in China, to Japan.

The outbreak itself was a concern for the 2020 Summer Olympics which was scheduled to take place in Tokyo starting at the end of July. The national government thus took extra precautions to help minimise the outbreak's impact.

On 27 February 2020, Prime Minister Shinzo Abe requested that all Japanese schools close until late March, the end of the school year, to help contain the virus.

===== South Korea =====
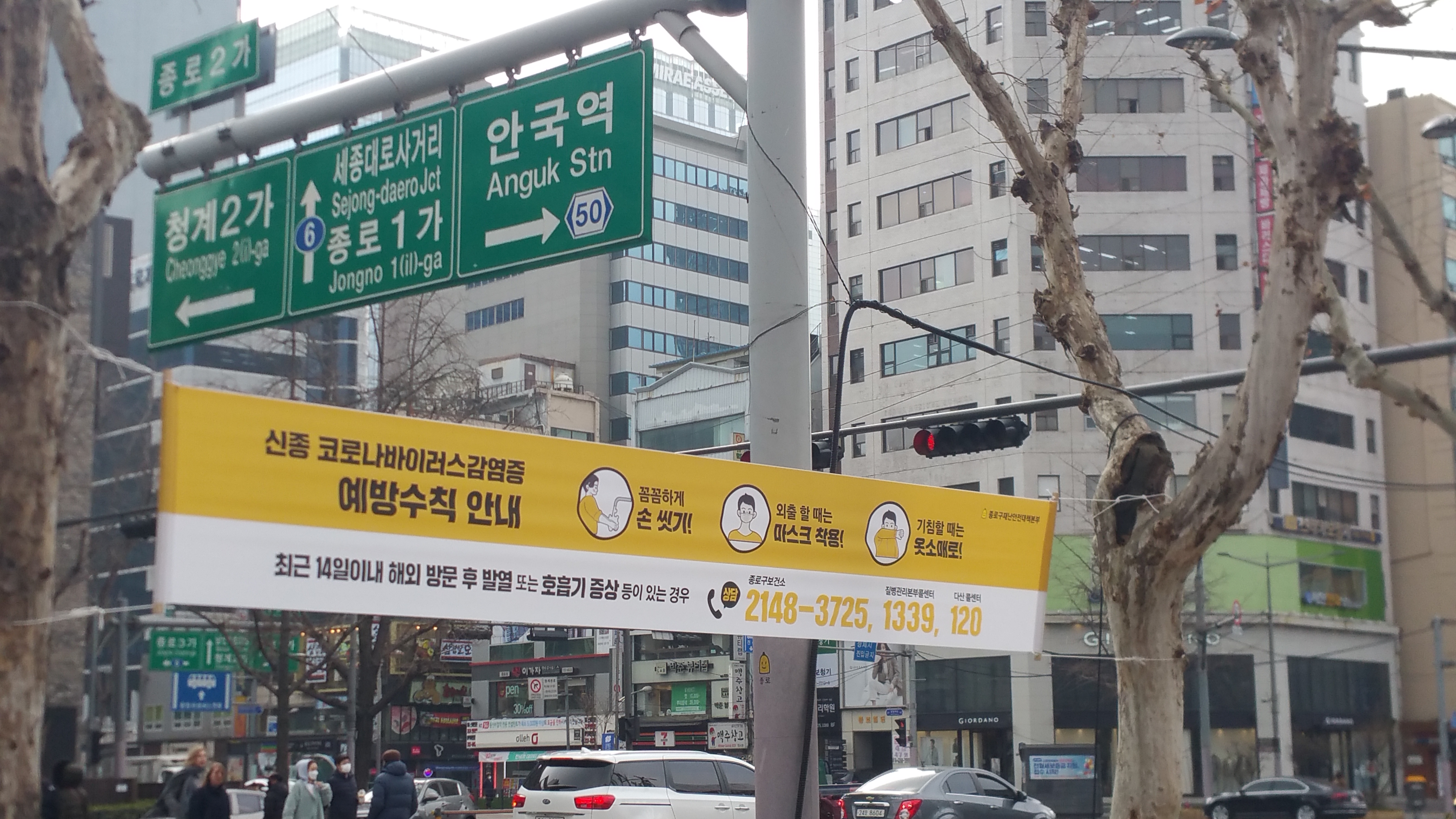
Coronavirus infection prevention tips banner in Seoul

On 5 February 2020, Hyundai Motor Company was forced to suspend production in South Korea due to shortage in supply of parts.

South Korea has been reporting increasing human-to-human community transmission of COVID-19 since 19 February 2020, traced to a church of Shincheonji, located near the city of Daegu. Apart from the city of Daegu and the church community involved, most of South Korea is operating close to normality, although nine planned festivals have been closed and tax-free retailers are closing. South Korean military manpower agency made an announcement that conscription from the Daegu would temporarily be suspended. The Daegu Office of Education decided to postpone the start of every school in the region by one week.

Numerous educational institutes have temporarily shut down, including dozens of kindergartens in Daegu and several elementary schools in Seoul. As of 18 February, most universities in South Korea had announced plans to postpone the start of the spring semester. This included 155 universities planning to delay the semester start by 2 weeks to 16 and 22 March universities planning to delay the semester start by 1 week to 9 March. Also, on 23 February 2020, all kindergartens, elementary schools, middle schools, and high schools were announced to delay the semester start from 2 to 9 March.

The economy of South Korea is forecast to grow 1.9%, which is down from 2.1%. The government has provided 136.7 billion won for local governments as support. The government has also organised the procurement of masks and other hygiene equipment.

===== Taiwan =====
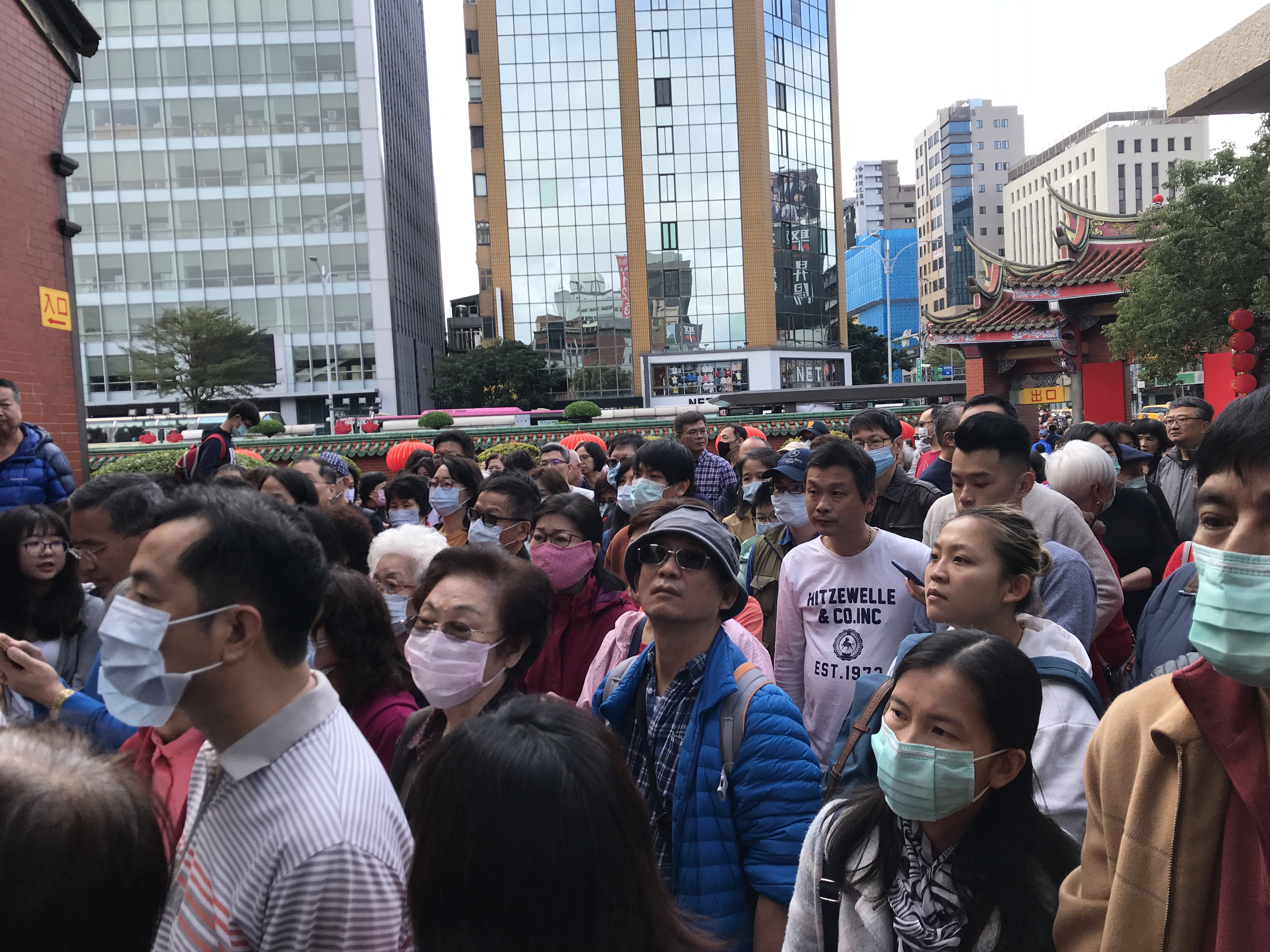
Surgical masks used by people in Taiwan

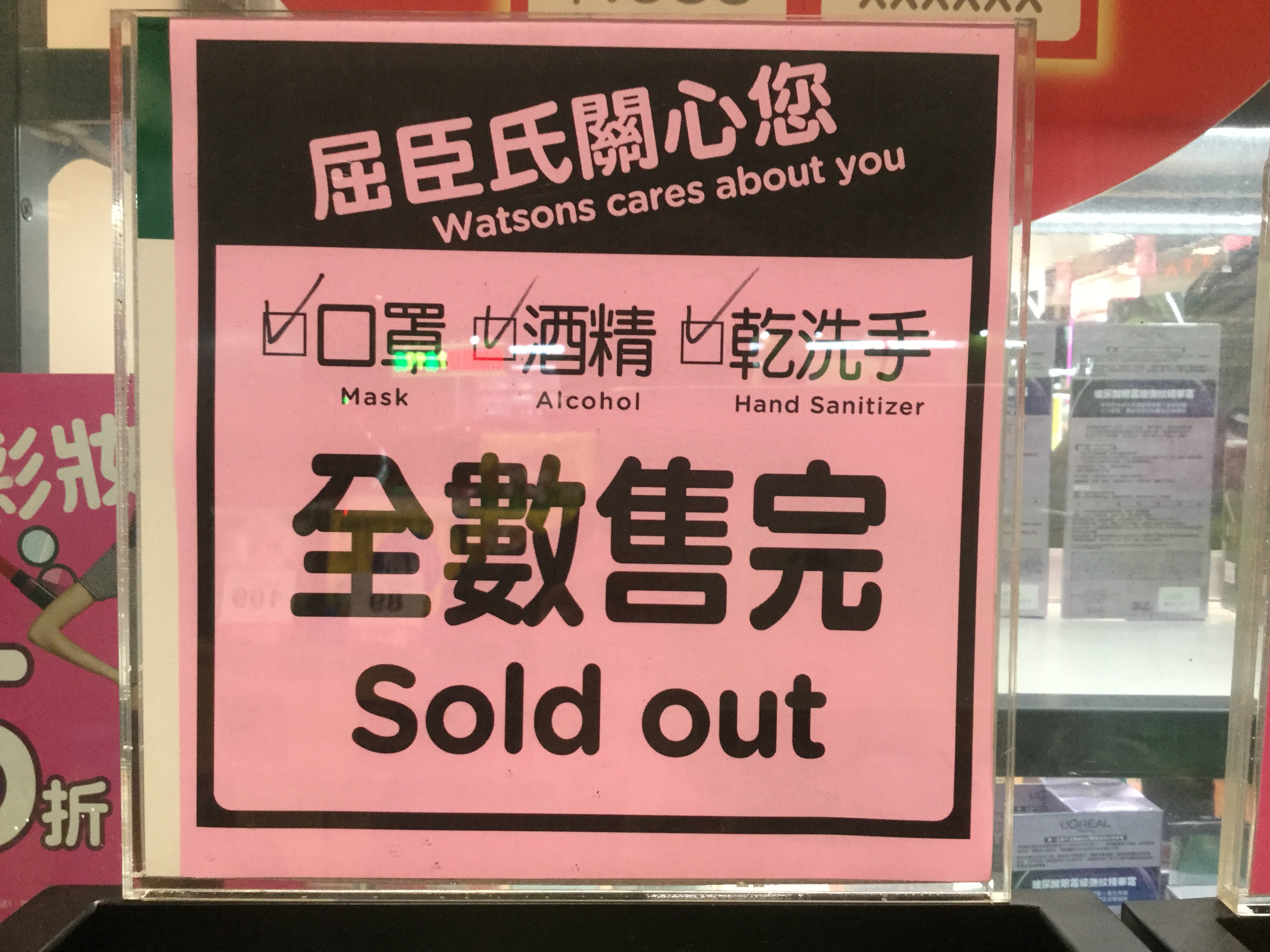
Surgical masks and other medical equipment sold out in Taiwan

On 24 January, the Taiwanese government announced a temporary ban on the export of face masks for a month to secure a supply of masks for its own citizens. On 2 February 2020, Taiwan's Central Epidemic Command Center postponed the opening of primary and secondary schools until 25 February. Taiwan has also announced a ban of cruise ships from entering all Taiwanese ports. In early February 2020 Taiwan's Central Epidemic Command Center requested the mobilisation of the Taiwanese Armed Forces to contain the spread of the virus and to build up the defences against it. Soldiers were dispatched to the factory floors of major mask manufacturers to help staff the 62 additional mask production lines being set up at the time.

In the aviation industry, Taiwanese carrier China Airlines's direct flights to Rome have been rejected and cancelled since Italy has announced the ban on Taiwanese flights. On the other hand, the second-largest Taiwanese carrier, Eva Air, has also postponed the launch of Milan and Phuket flights. Both Taiwanese airlines have cut numerous cross-strait destinations, leaving just three Chinese cities still served.

==== South Asia ====
===== India =====
In India, economists expect the near-term impact of the outbreak to be limited to the supply chains of major conglomerates, especially pharmaceuticals, fertilisers, automobiles, textiles and electronics. A severe impact on global trade logistics is also expected due to disruption of logistics in mainland China, but due to the combined risk with regional geopolitical tensions, wider trade wars and Brexit. The stock market took a bearish mode in response to COVID-19. The BSE SENSEX fell 2919 and NIFTY 50 fell 950 points in a single day on 12 March 2020.

On 19 March 2020, the Indian government has banned the export of ventilators, surgical/disposable masks and textile raw materials. Oil has plummeted to 18-year low of $22 per barrel in March, and Foreign Portfolio Investors (FPIs) have withdrawn huge amounts from India, about US$571.4 million. While lower oil prices would shrink the current account deficit, reverse capital flows would expand it. Rupee was continuously depreciating. MSMEs would undergo a severe cash crunch.

===== Pakistan =====
The economy of Pakistan faced a devastating impact from the coronavirus outbreak because it was in recessionary conditions in the quarter prior to the pandemic. Weak social protections and low investment in healthcare meant that most citizens were vulnerable to pandemic conditions at the time of the outbreak. Forecasts of the economic loss from the three-month lockdown, which was subsequently eased in late May 2020, indicated that Pakistan would face its first annual economic recession since 1952. Given the strained government resources, civil society and charity organizations became much more active in providing relief to the public during the national lockdown.

===== Sri Lanka =====
In February 2020, research houses expected the economic impact in Sri Lanka to be limited to a short-term impact on the tourism and transport sectors.

==== Southeast Asia ====
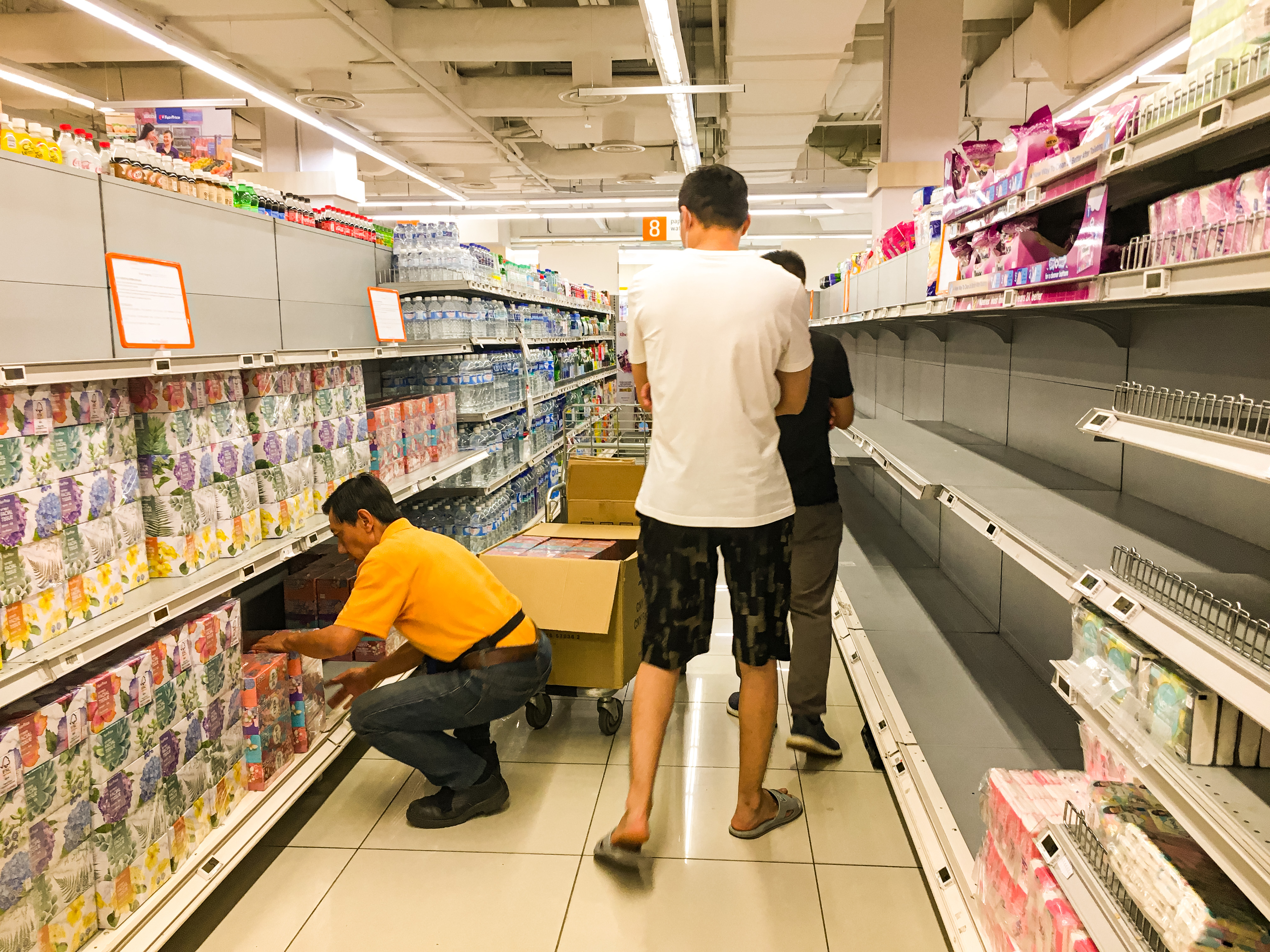
Coronavirus fears lead to panic buying of essentials in Singapore

Among Association of Southeast Asian Nations countries, the city-state of Singapore was forecast to be one of the worst-hit countries by Maybank. The tourism sector was considered to be an "immediate concern" along with the effects on production lines due to disruption to factories and logistics in mainland China. Singapore has witnessed panic buying of essential groceries, and of masks, thermometers and sanitation products despite being advised against doing so by the Government. Prime Minister Lee Hsien Loong said that a recession in the country is a possibility and that the country's economy "would definitely take a hit". On 17 February, the Ministry of Trade and Industry (MTI) downgraded Singapore's forecast GDP growth to between −0.5% and 1.5%. This is largely due to the fall in tourism and social distancing restrictions. On 26 March, MTI said it believed that the economy would contract by between 1% and 4% in 2020. This was after the economy shrank some 2.2% in the first quarter of 2020 from the same quarter in 2019. On 26 May, the Singapore economy contracted 0.7%YoY, which was better than the expected contraction of 2.2%. However, MTI said that it was revising down its expectation for the Singapore economy in 2020 to shrink by 4% to 7%. Economists were behind the curve in downgrading their numbers. Euben Paracuelles, at Nomura argued that while some ASEAN economies had success in containing the virus, the presence of global uncertainties meant that any regional recovery would be restrained. For example, while Thailand had managed to contain the virus, it was not open to tourism, which forms a substantial part of its economy.

Prime Minister Hun Sen of Cambodia made a special visit to China with an aim to showcase Cambodia's support to China in fighting the outbreak of the epidemic.

Maybank economists rated Thailand as being most at risk, with the threat of the viral outbreak's impact on tourism causing the Thai baht to fall to a seven-month low.

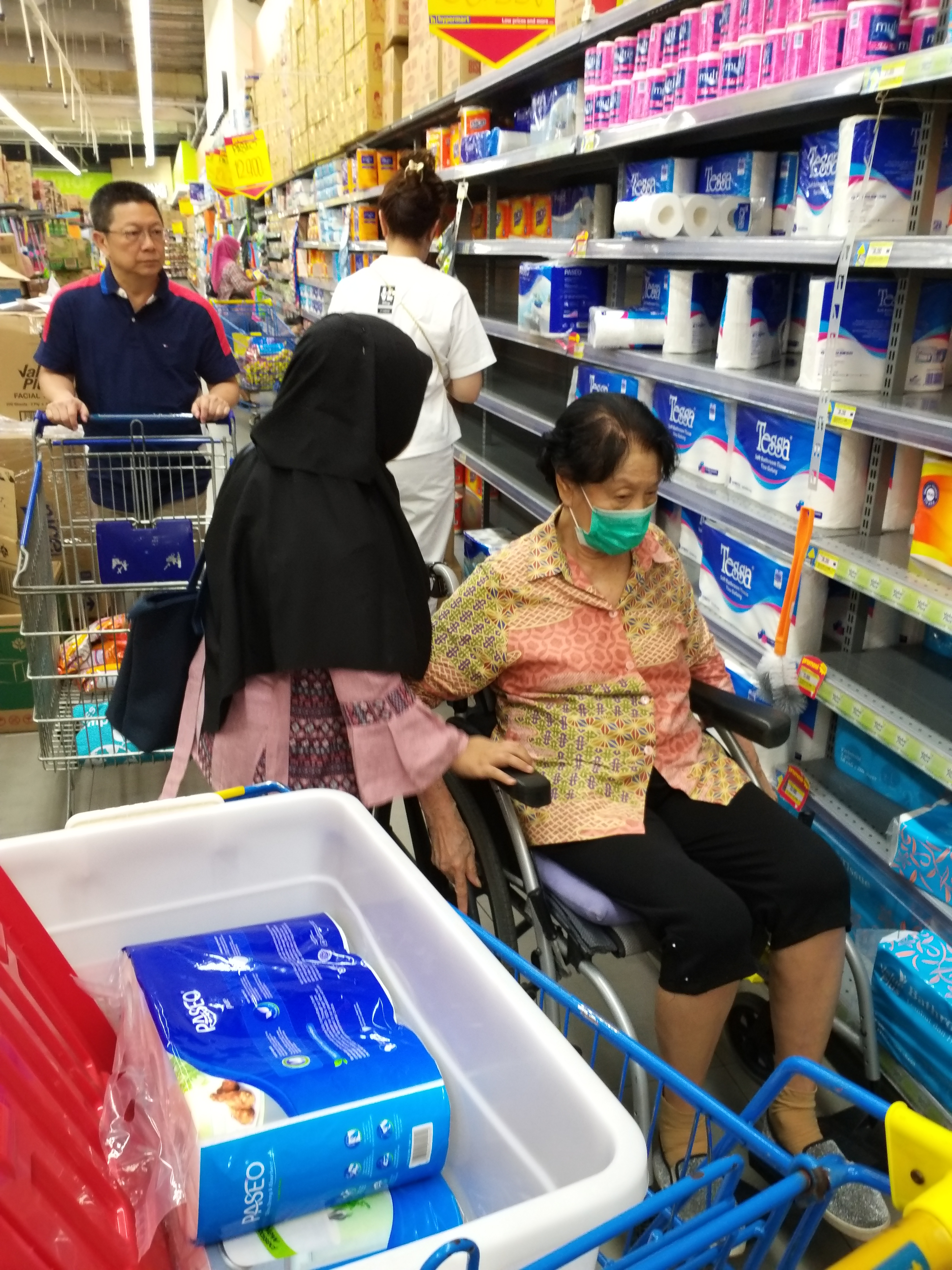
Panic buying in a supermarket in Indonesia

In Indonesia, over 10,000 Chinese tourists cancelled trips over coronavirus fears. Many existing Chinese visitors are queuing up with the Indonesian authority appealing for extended stay. Panic buying has also hit the capital city, Jakarta. As the first reported cases of COVID-19 was announced by the government at 3 March.

In Malaysia, economists predicted that the outbreak would affect the country's GDP, trade and investment flows, commodity prices and tourist arrivals. Initially, the cycling race event Le Tour de Langkawi was rumoured to be cancelled, but the organiser stated that it would continue to be held as usual. As the outbreak situation has worsened, some of the upcoming concerts held in the country were postponed or cancelled.

The Philippines reported that its GDP contracted by 9.5% in 2020, its worst contraction since World War II. The last full-year contraction in the country was in 1998 due to the 1997 Asian financial crisis, where its GDP grew by −0.5%. The 2020 contraction was also worse than the 7% contraction in 1984.

Vietnam, who had clamped down early to prevent the spread of the coronavirus, was expected to be the only country in the South East Asia region that was expected to grow in 2020.

==== Middle East ====
===== Iran =====
On 26 March, Rouhani requested to withdraw 1 billion dollars from National Development Fund and Khamenei allowed the withdrawal within eleven days. On 28 March, Rouhani announced that 20% of the country's annual budget would be allocated to fight the virus. The following day, he defended against criticisms of the government's response to the outbreak, saying that he needed to weigh protecting the country's economy that was already affected by US sanctions while fighting the worst outbreak of the region.

===== Israel =====
At its peak, Israel was one of the world's worst hit countries from the COVID-19 pandemic. By 1 April 2020, the national unemployment rate had reached 24.4 percent. In the month of March alone, more than 844,000 individuals applied for unemployment benefits—90% of whom had been placed on unpaid leave due to the pandemic. Following a successful vaccination campaign, Israel currently issues 'green passports' for individuals who have received their 2nd vaccine dose; which allow indefinite access to many places and amenities formerly only accessible to those with a negative COVID-19 test result. The subsequent low-infection rates have eased restrictions and the economic tension in the country.

On 30 March 2020, Prime Minister Netanyahu announced an economic rescue package totaling 80 billion shekels ($22 billion), saying that was 6% of the country's GDP. The money would be allocated to health care (10 billion₪); welfare and unemployment (30 billion₪) aid for small and large businesses (32 billion₪), and to financial stimulus (8 billion₪).

Israel agreed to pay Russia to send Russian-made Sputnik V vaccine doses to Syria as part of a Russia-mediated prisoner swap agreement.

In 2020, Israel's economy shrank by 2.4%, following 3.4% and 3.5% growth in 2019 and 2018 respectively. This is considerably below the Euro-bloc where the economy shrank by 5%.

===== Saudi Arabia =====
On 27 February, Saudi Arabia halted travel to Mecca and Medina over coronavirus. This has prevented foreigners from reaching the holy city of Mecca and the Kaaba. Travel was also suspended to Muhammad's mosque in Medina. Images of the emptied ṣaḥn of the Great Mosque of Mecca, where pilgrims are ordinarily performing the tawaf around the Kaaba, went viral on social media.

===== United Arab Emirates =====
The COVID-19 pandemic reportedly pressured the property sector, which has already been dealing with the imbalance between supply and demand for years. Dubai's property firms, Emaar Properties, and DAMAC Properties reported losses following the surge in COVID-19. Emaar reported a 58% loss in net profit while DAMAC Properties reported a net loss of 1.04 billion dirhams in the year 2020.

In March 2021, the restrictions on global supply-chain caused a great impact on Dubai's business activities, which were struggling to recover from the impact of the COVID-19 pandemic. The IHS Markit compiled Dubai's Purchasing Managers’ Index that rose to 51 from 50.9 in February 2021, saving from landing in the contraction zone by only one point. The global supply difficulties also led to "constraint profit margins", as the need of demand recovery forced firms to lower output charges.

==== Jordan ====
Jordan's real GDP fell by 1.6% in 2020, with a dramatic reduction in tourism, one of its most crucial economic sectors. The sector's GDP fell by 3%.

SMEs appeared less affected by the pandemic than bigger enterprises. 50% of banks questioned reported an increase in loan supply to SMEs, while 25% reported a reduction. For corporates, the increase in loan supply was 25% and 45% reported a reduction. The country's unemployment rate hit 25% in 2021, the highest in more than 25 years.

Macroeconomic stability, however, has been maintained, and the International Monetary Fund expects modest growth rates for 2022 (2.7%) and 2023 (2.7%) in predictions provided in the October 2021 World Economic Outlook. In the first half of 2021, real GDP increased by 3.2%.

=== Europe ===
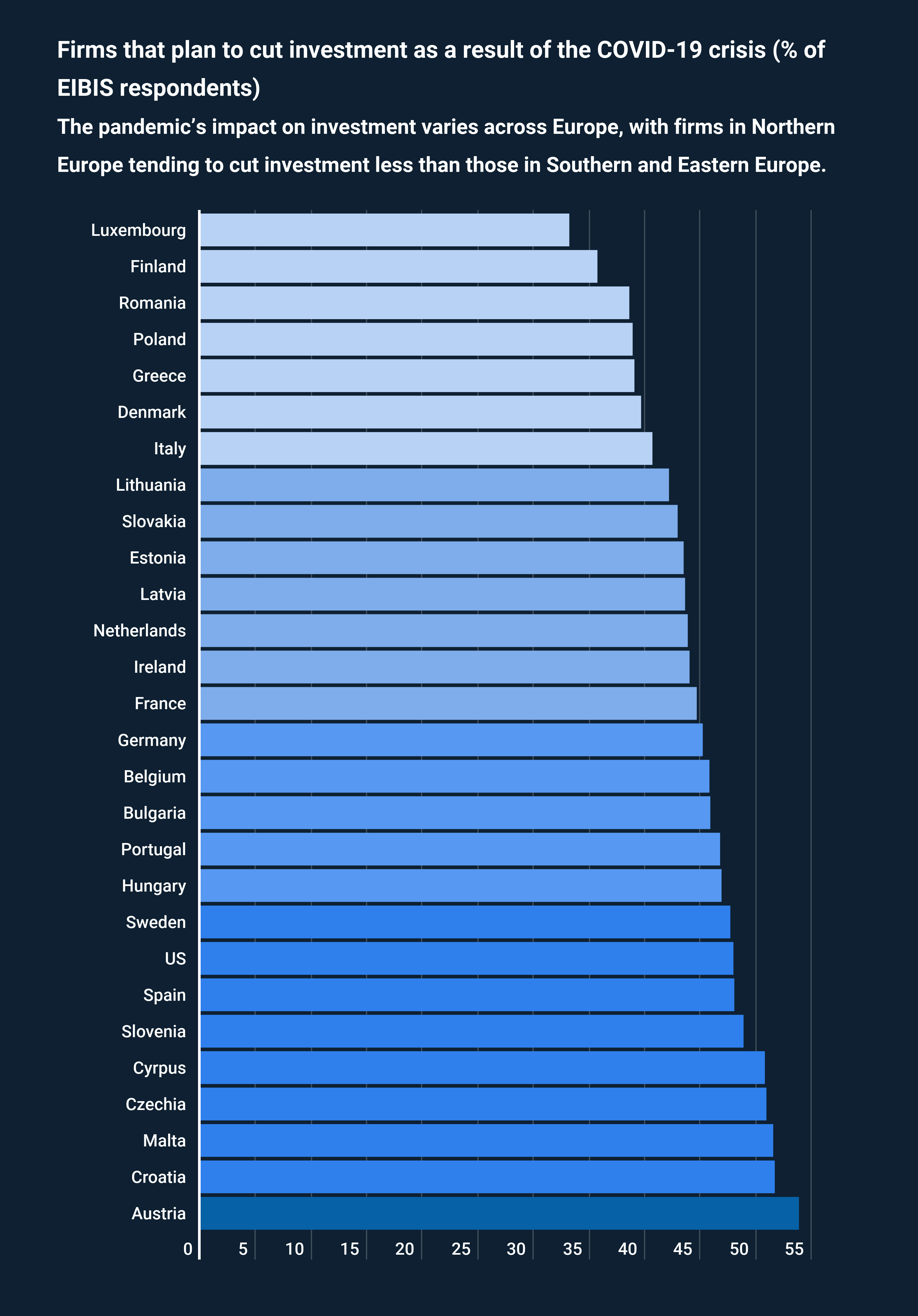
European Investment Bank Investment Survey 2020

In Spain, a large number of exhibitors (including Chinese firms Huawei and Vivo) announced plans to pull out of or reduce their presence at Mobile World Congress in Barcelona. On 12 February 2020, GSMA CEO John Hoffman announced that the event had been cancelled, as the concerns had made it "impossible" to host.

Owing to an increase in the demand for masks, on 1 February most masks were sold out in Portuguese pharmacies. On 4 February, President Marcelo Rebelo de Sousa admitted that the epidemic of the new coronavirus in China "affects the economic activity of a very powerful economy and thus affects the world's economic activity or could affect". He also admitted the possibility of economic upheavals due to the break in production." On 28 February, the Swiss government has banned all public and private gatherings of more than 1,000 people until 15 March, including forcing a cancellation of the Geneva International Motor Show.

Before the COVID-19 pandemic, about 86% of EU enterprises were making investments. In 2021 this remained mostly steady compared to 2020 (81%). EU businesses were optimistic for investment throughout 2022, with 20% more anticipating investment to rise than fall.

According to the a survey on investment conducted by the European Investment Bank, European firms lost one-quarter of their gross income on average in the second quarter of 2020. The loss was substantially greater than the drop experienced by enterprises during the 2008 financial crisis and the Euro area crisis.

The European Investment Bank estimates that corporate investment in the EU could fall by between 31% and 52%, even in more favourable scenarios due to the pandemic. They also estimate that even after strong policy intervention, 51–58% of EU firms face liquidity shortfalls after 3 months of lockdown. 34% of enterprises also projected their capacity to fund internal investments to decline in the coming 12 months. The European Investment Bank Group created a €25 billion Pan-European Guarantee fund to help small businesses recover from the COVID-19 crisis. As a result of this guarantee fund, the EIB Group, in partnership with local lenders and national promotional institutions, is able to increase its support to small and medium-sized companies.

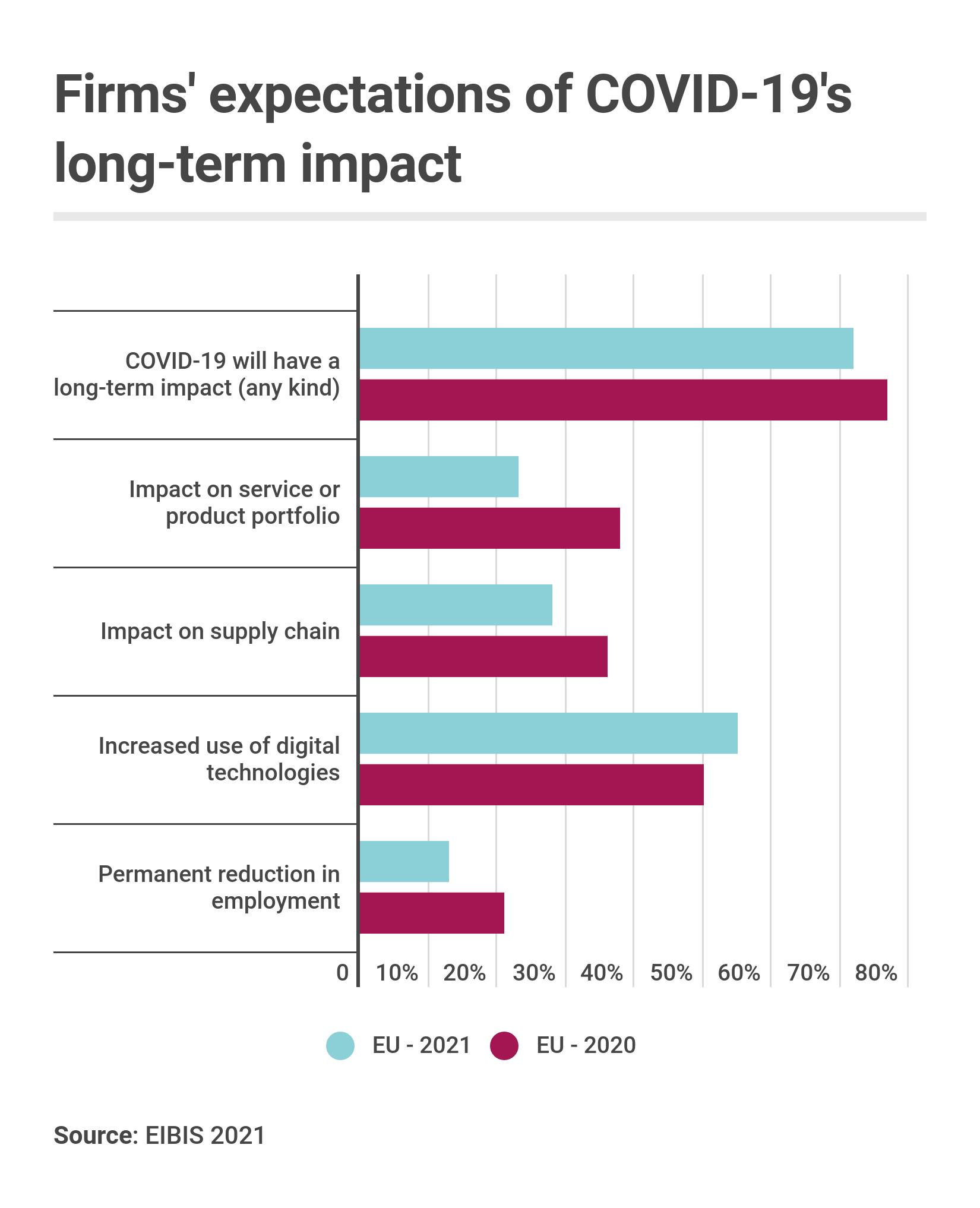
Expectations of the pandemic's long-term impact in EU firms.

Small businesses have been hit hard by the COVID-19 pandemic and its lockdowns. Many of them also lacked the technological tools to survive in an unprecedented environment. To make things worse, in the European regions most affected by the coronavirus pandemic small businesses are usually less digitalised.

Less than 20% of European small and medium-sized enterprises (SMEs) are highly digitalised, whereas almost 50% of large corporations are digitalised, having an economic impact. Small businesses are the engine of the European economy and they play a vital role in our economic recovery and growth. These businesses need financial support for their digitalisation. In response to COVID-19, almost 60% of EU businesses have received financial help – subsidies or other non-repayable aid. Enterprises that incurred sales losses were more likely to get policy help (about 73% received financial assistance, compared to 47% of firms that did not see any sales declines).

Due to the COVID-19 pandemic, 49% of enterprises in the European Union saw a drop in sales in 2021, compared to 21% who saw a boost. Digital businesses withstood the pandemic better than enterprises that were less productive before the crisis. Sales were down more for Small businesses, by at least 25%, than for medium or large businesses. In response to fewer sales, 23% reduced their investment intentions, while just 3% intended to increase their investment. The share of companies that invested dropped from 86% in 2019 to 79% in 2021.

Furlough and short-term employment programmes in the European Union kept people employed, while bankruptcy filing rules for businesses were reduced, allowing workers to keep their jobs. A significant portion of businesses benefited from the policy support for the COVID-19 shock across all EU regions. The most prevalent forms of assistance across all areas were subsidies or other non-repayable support measures, including support for furlough programs. Inequality existed across EU regions. Compared to enterprises in less developed regions (40%) or non-cohesion regions (37%) firms in transition regions were less likely to get subsidies (28%).

Since the beginning of 2020, EU enterprises that embraced advanced digital technology and invested in becoming more digital during the pandemic have increased the number of employees they employ. After the COVID-19 outbreak, the number of non-digital enterprises that downsized was also greater than the share of non-digital firms that had positive job growth. Non-digital companies had a negative net employment balance.

Eastern Europe (together with Central Asia) saw a dramatic drop in economic activity as a result of COVID-19. GDP in the region fell by 4% on average in 2020, with businesses in contact-intensive service industries being particularly adversely impacted. However, the level of governmental support was vast, with fiscal measures totaling about 6% of GDP. The majority of businesses suffered losses in 2020 and/or 2021, with 13% still predicting that they won't be able to recover from the pandemic-era loss of business until 2022.

When compared to the final quarter of 2019, investment levels in several nations decreased or were flat in the second quarter of 2022. Denmark, Italy, Ireland, and Sweden are exceptions, with investment levels increasing by more than 10%. Other nations had drops in investment of up to 13%, such as Slovakia and Bulgaria. By mid-2022, Bulgaria and Slovakia had recovered the least from the pandemic, while Slovenia, Lithuania, and Estonia had recovered the most.

The proportion of EU enterprises that have invested in 2023 has returned to pre-pandemic levels (85%), and investment per employee is even higher. Government assistance has also decreased, with 16% of European firms making use of government grants to finance investment. Only 21% of firms (that took part in a survey conducted in the EU) received grants the previous year.

During the COVID-19 pandemic, there was less extensive help provided to mid-caps than to SMEs and large enterprises. In response to COVID-19, 51% of major mid-caps in the European Union obtained financial assistance, compared to 60% for SMEs, small mid-caps, and 56% for the largest enterprises.

Among firms that received at least one type of support during the COVID-19 pandemic, only about 13% of large and small mid-caps reported receiving government support in response to COVID-19, compared to nearly 20% in SMEs and 15% in large firms. In 2022, mid-caps were less likely to get government funding for COVID-19 compared to SMEs and XL businesses. On average, 67% of small mid-caps and 63% of big mid-caps cited trade barriers connected to the Russian invasion of Ukraine, with 54% of small and 54% of large mid-caps suffering obstacles caused by both COVID-19 and the Russian invasion.

Mid-caps are nearly twice as likely as SMEs to boost investment post-pandemic, but at a lower rate than large enterprises. Firms anticipating a rise in investment minus those expecting a decline post-pandemic have a net balance of 20% for small mid-caps and 26% for big mid-caps, while SMEs report just 10%.

As of 2023, real investment is up 5% from before the COVID-19 crisis. It was down 11% at the same time after the 2008 financial crisis.

==== Armenia ====
The Armenian Government tried to confront the influence of the pandemic by implementing mitigation measures plus a lockdown. This adversely impacted businesses in Armenia, which either shut down or did not work with the same capacity as before. One of the consequences of this was supply shock. The supply shock caused a sharp decrease in sales. Companies adopted policies like reduction of working hours and wages, and workforce reductions. This led to the reduction in per capita income.

The IMF estimated that the contribution of the final consumption expenditure had diminished in 2020 by 2.1% (from 3.3% up to 1.2%). The production decreases led to a drop in corporate tax revenue. Moreover, public expenditures sharply increased to help companies and households. However, this caused a budget deficit and increasing external debt.

The financial difficulties caused by the pandemic also affected loan repayments and led to a sharp decrease in savings. The Armenian National Statistical Service mentioned that in the first 3–4 months of 2020, wages were increased by 6.8%, which helped citizens during the pandemic. The United Nations assessed that the loan/GDP ratio, which stood at 52.1% as of September 2020, would lead to an overall decrease in loan portfolio performance, as many loans would go unpaid. The limitations on international travel during the pandemic affected the international trade of goods and services. Predictions of the IMF in 2020 assumed that there would be a decline (60% in total) of the influx of the personal remittances and foreign direct investments.

Among all enterprises affected by international trade interruptions in the Central, Eastern regions, 63% reported taking steps to limit the damage, which is higher than the EU average. Central European enterprises are more likely than the EU generally to increase the number of trading partners to diversify risks from trade interruptions (45% against 37% in the EU).

Around AMD 26 billion (US$55 million), according to official cost estimates, has been set aside for the implementation of the thirteen social assistance programs. The majority of spending (US$25 million) has gone toward providing salary support to workers in the impacted industry, followed by family benefits (US$15 million) and electricity bill subsidies (US$10 million). Each participant received a one-time benefit of between US$53 and US$270.

Because of the pandemic, the economy of Armenia wasn't able to generate enough savings to finance investments. Concurrently, the Armenian economy was unable to generate enough exports to finance the imports, which caused an expanding trade deficit of around US$2.9 billion in 2019. The COVID-19 pandemic impacted the Armenian economy, and as a result the GDP dropped on average by 5.3% from January to August 2020.

==== France ====
On 8 April, the Bank of France officially declared that the French economy was in recession, shrinking by 6 percent in the first quarter of 2020.

==== Germany ====
According to the Deutsche Bank the outbreak of the novel coronavirus / COVID-19 May contribute to a recession in Germany.

==== Ireland ====
By mid-March, nearly 3% of Ireland's population—140,000 people (including 70,000 restaurant staff, 50,000 pub and bar staff)—had lost their jobs due to restrictions brought in to delay the virus's spread. The numbers of people in normally busy Dublin areas such as Grafton Street dropped by percentages in the sixties, seventies and eighties.

On 16 March, Minister for Employment Affairs and Social Protection Regina Doherty announced the COVID-19 Pandemic Unemployment Payment. Initially available for six weeks, it was extended for another nine weeks on 5 June. On 24 March, the Temporary COVID-19 Wage Subsidy Scheme was announced for a twelve-week run beginning on 26 March.

On 15 May, Minister for Business, Enterprise and Innovation Heather Humphreys announced details of a new €250m "Restart Grant" which would give direct grant aid of between €2,000 and €10,000 to small businesses to help them with the costs associated with reopening and re-employing workers following the COVID-19 closures.

On 22 May, the Government of Ireland had signed off on €6.8 billion in extra funding for the Department of Employment Affairs and Social Protection, as it was due to reach this year's spending limit early the following month.

On 23 July, the Government of Ireland launched a €7.4 billion July Jobs Stimulus package to boost economic recovery and get people back to work. The measures include the extension of the COVID-19 Pandemic Unemployment Payment to April 2021, and the replacement of the Temporary COVID-19 Wage Subsidy Scheme to the Employment Wage Subsidy Scheme from September 2020 and would run until April 2021.

On 7 September, it was announced that Ireland was now officially in recession after the economy shrank by 6.1% between April and June as the impact of COVID-19 brought the largest quarterly drop on record, following new figures published by the Central Statistics Office.

==== Italy ====
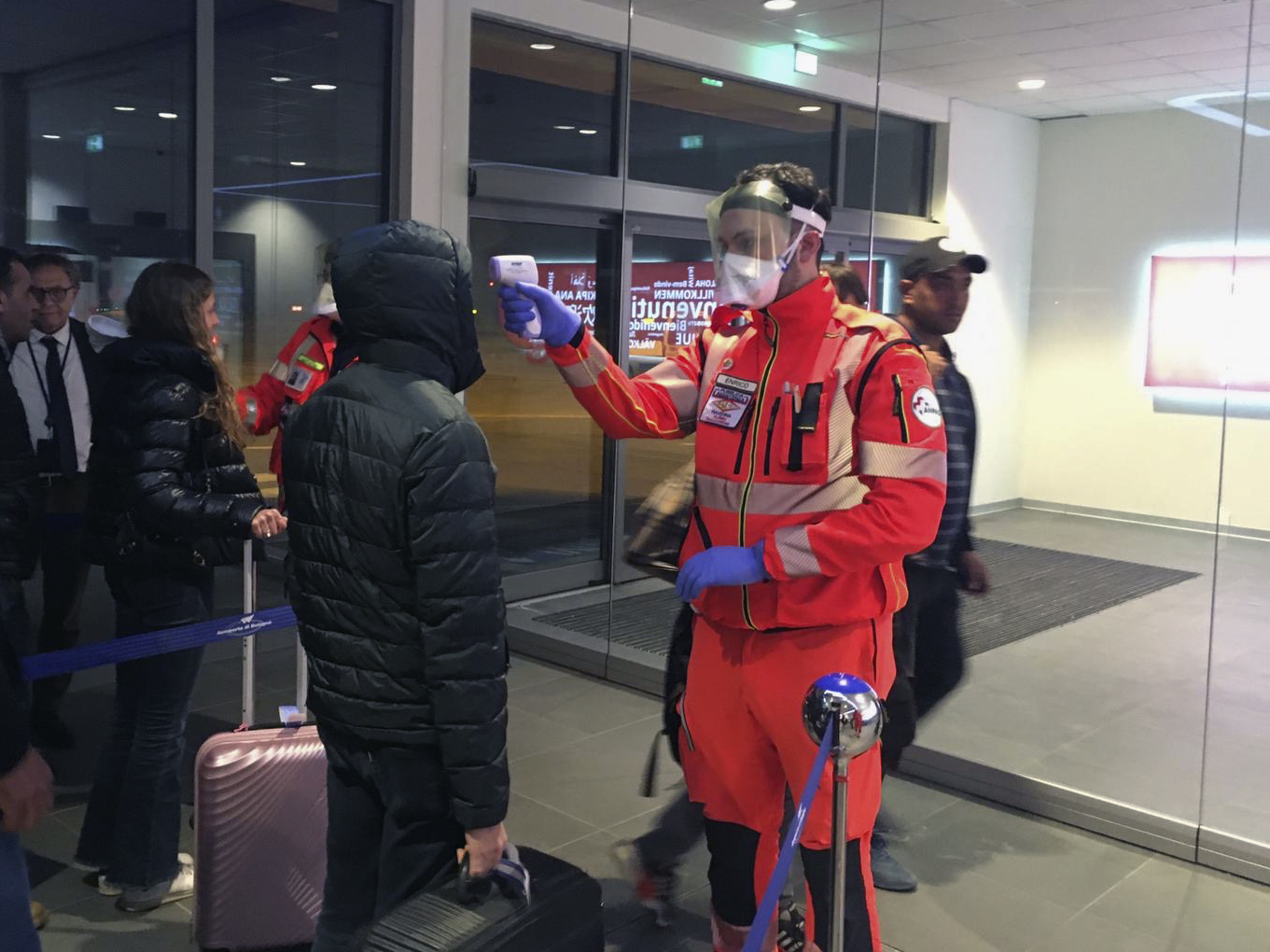
Civil Protection volunteers carrying out health checks at the Guglielmo Marconi Airport in Bologna, Italy

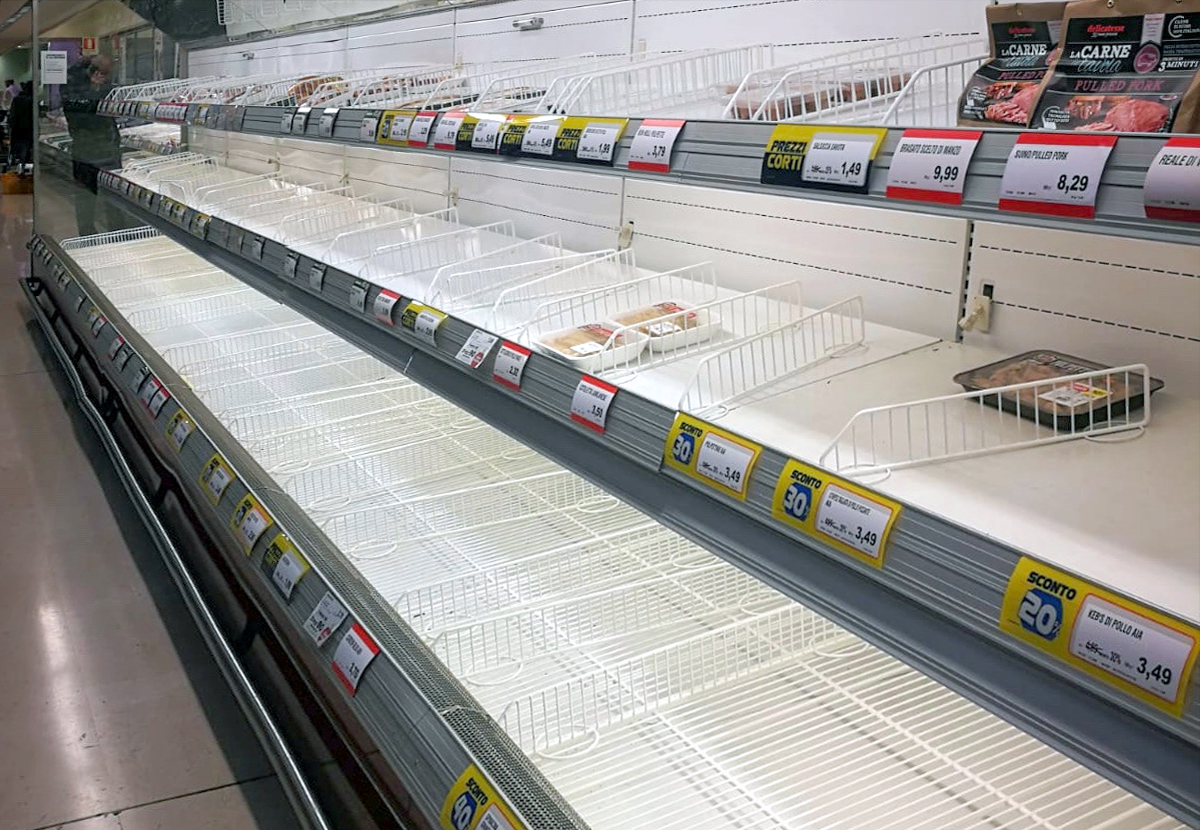
Empty shelves at the Esselunga supermarket in Bergamo, Italy

On 21 February, at least ten towns in the Lombardy and Veneto regions of Italy, with a total population of 50,000, were locked down in quarantine. Schools and universities have been closed throughout Northern Italy along with museums, and various festivities, concerts, sporting events and church masses have been cancelled as of 23 February. On 4 March, these closures were extended to all schools and universities nationwide.

Sustained panic buying of groceries has reportedly cleared out supermarkets, and several major events were cancelled, such as the annual Carnival of Venice, along with the cancellation of Serie A football matches on 23 February by the Sports Ministry. Concerns about the Milan Fashion Week has led to several fashion houses declaring that they would only hold broadcast, closed-door shows with no spectators. As of 26 February 2020, there have been 456 coronavirus cases in Italy, 190 of which have been also confirmed by the Istituto Superiore di Sanità.

By 12 March 2020, the number of cases in Italy had risen to 15,113, including 1,016 fatalities. On 9 March 2020, Italy declared a nationwide quarantine. Since 10 March 2020, all residents need a special form to be allowed to leave their homes. On 11 March 2020, all shops and businesses were closed except food shops and pharmacies. After the "Sostegni Decree" of 23 March 2021, the Italian government has ended the ban on collective dismissals since 1 July, except for the textile, fashion and footwear economic sectors for which it has been extended until 31 October.

==== Portugal ====
Due to an increase in the demand for masks, on 1 February most masks were sold out in Portuguese pharmacies.

On 4 February, Marcelo Rebelo de Sousa, the President of the Portuguese Republic, admitted that the epidemic of the new coronavirus in China "affects the economic activity of a very powerful economy and thus affects the world's economic activity or could affect". He also admitted the possibility of economic upheavals due to the break in production."

==== Turkey ====
An ongoing economic crisis in Turkey was exacerbated by the COVID-19 pandemic. Sale of Turkish goods worldwide fell due to the global economic slowdown. President Recep Tayyip Erdoğan cut interest rates in late 2021 in response to a surge in inflation of the Turkish lira.

==== United Kingdom ====
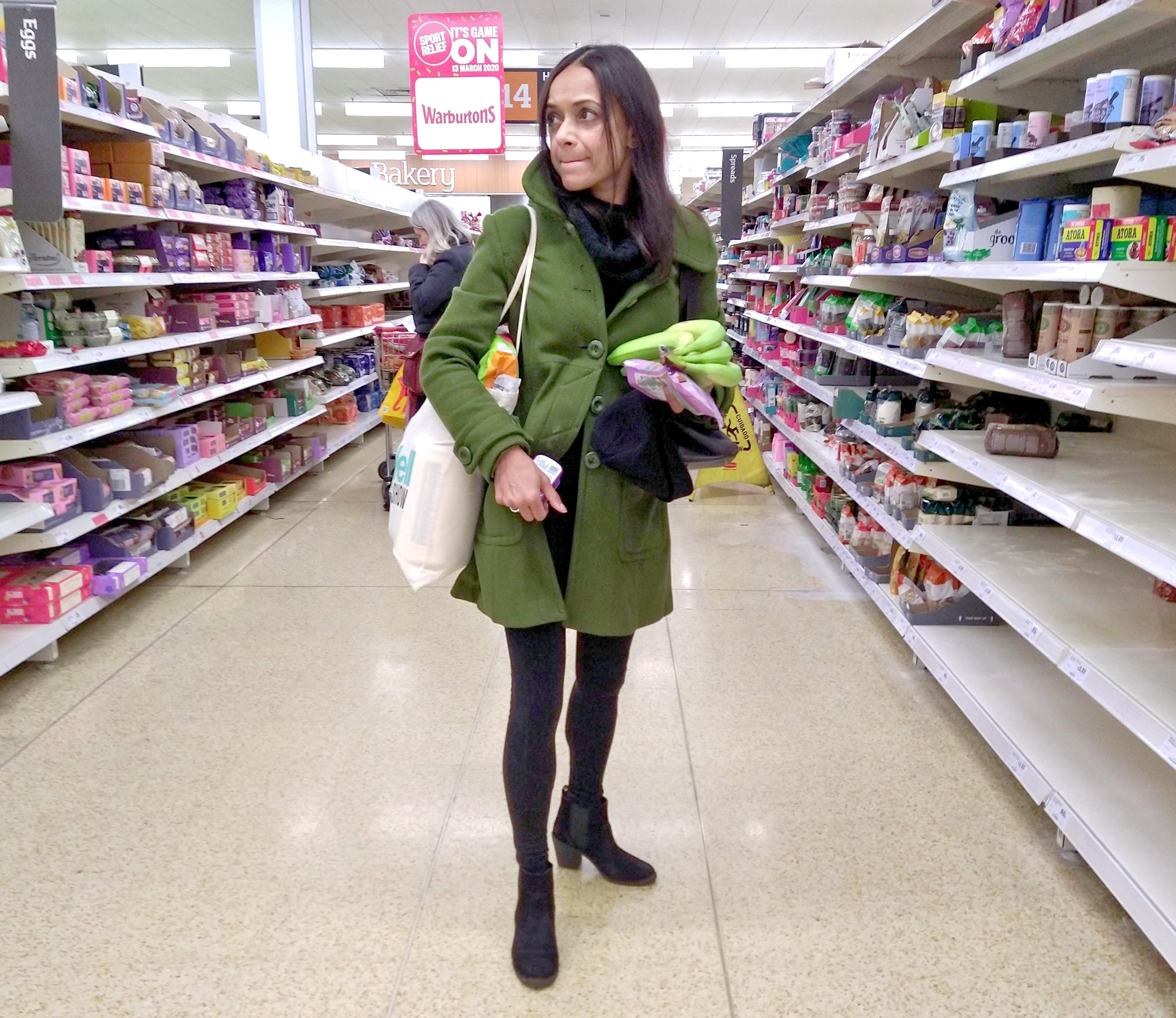
Pensive shopper during the Coronavirus Covid-19 outbreak in the U.K.

On 13 February, heavy equipment manufacturer JCB announced its plan to reduce working hours and production due to shortages in their supply chain caused by the outbreak.

On 5 March, British airline Flybe finally collapsed into administration with the loss of 2,000 jobs after failing to secure financial support. The airline said the impact of the coronavirus pandemic is partly to blame for its collapse. Flybe provided more than half of UK domestic flights outside London.

During the pandemic, exports of many food and drink products from the UK declined significantly, and that included Scotch whisky. Distillers were required to close for some time and the hospitality industry worldwide experienced a major slump. According to news reports in February 2021, the Scotch whisky sector had experienced £1.1 billion in lost sales. A BBC News headline on 12 February 2021 summarized the situation: "Scotch whisky exports slump to 'lowest in a decade'".

Tourism in the UK (by visitors from both the UK and from other countries) declined substantially due to travel restrictions and lockdowns. For much of 2020, and into 2021, vacation travel was not permitted and entry into the UK was very strictly limited. Business travel, for example, declined by nearly 90% over previous years. This not only affected revenue from tourism but also led to numerous job losses.

=== North America ===
==== Canada ====
On 4 March, Canadian Prime Minister Justin Trudeau announced the creation of a new cabinet committee to manage the federal response to the coronavirus disease. A week later, on 11 March, the government announced a CA$1 billion COVID-19 Response Fund that included a $50 million contribution to the World Health Organization and an additional $275 million to fund coronavirus research in Canada.

On 13 March, the Bank of Canada lowered the overnight rate target by 50 basis points to 0.75 percent in an unscheduled rate decision citing the "negative shocks to Canada's economy arising from the COVID-19 pandemic and the recent sharp drop in oil prices." In June 2020, Canada lost its triple "A" credit rating.

==== Mexico ====
The National Institute of Statistics and Geography (INEGI) said the unemployment rate in Mexico increased from 3.6% in January 2020 to 3.7% in February 2020. The informal sector increased to 56.3% in February compared to 56.0% in February 2019. Fewer than half of Mexicans have paid sick leave or health care. BBVA México predicted a 4.5% economic contraction in 2020, while analysts at Capital Economics in London argued that the government had to do more to support the economy. They forecast a 6% contraction in 2020. HR Ratings, Latin America's first credit rating agency, said that the performance of the economy would depend on the government's response to the COVID-19 crisis.

The Mexican Stock Exchange fell to a record low on 10 March due to fears of the coronavirus and because of falling oil prices. The Bank of Mexico (Banxico) stepped in to prop up the value of the peso, which fell 14%. World markets are seeing falls similar to those of 1987.

The Consejo Nacional Empresarial Turístico (National Tourism Business Council, CNET) sent two letters in March to Alfonso Romo, Chief of Staff to the President of Mexico, outlining the importance of tourism to the economy and asking for government support for the sector. Tourism provides 4 million jobs in Mexico, and 93% of the companies have ten or fewer employees. COVID-19 forced the closure of 4,000 hotels (52,400 rooms) and 2,000 restaurants, while the airline industry lost MXN $30 billion (US$1.3 billion) through March. The association of car dealers, ADMA, predicted a decrease in domestic sales between 16% and 25% in 2020.

==== Panama ====
COVID-19 is expected to subtract US$5.8 billion from Panama's GDP.

==== United States ====
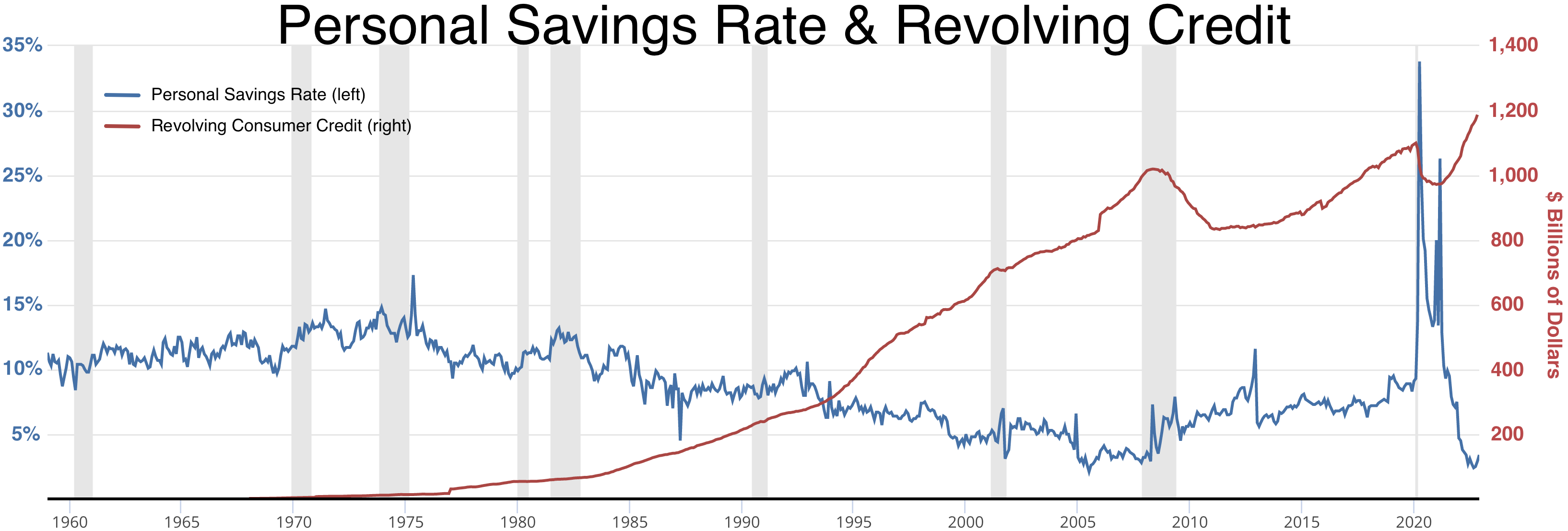
Personal savings rate (left) Revolving credit (right)

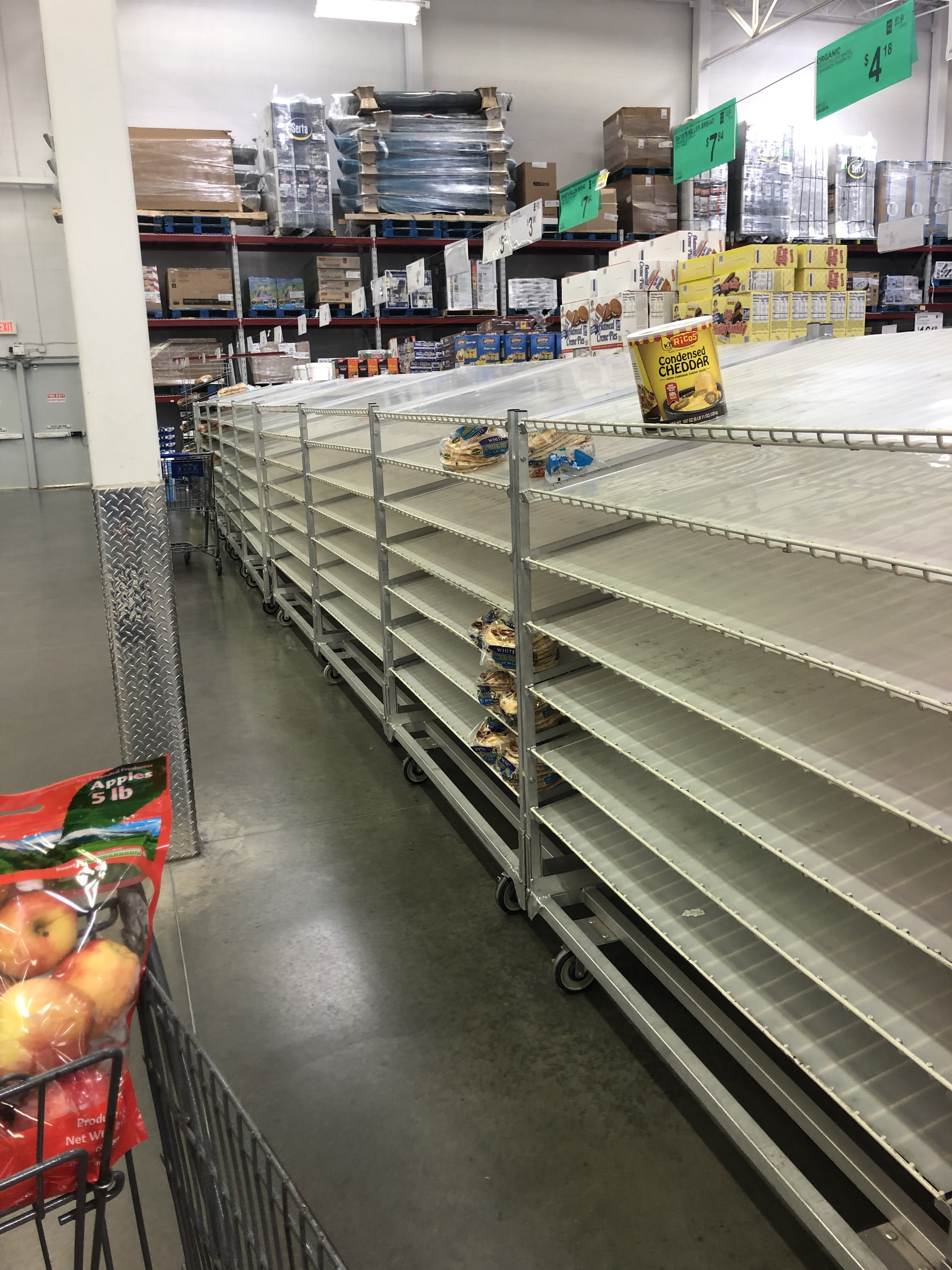
Empty shelves from panic buying at the Sam's Club in Lufkin, Texas, on 13 March 2020.

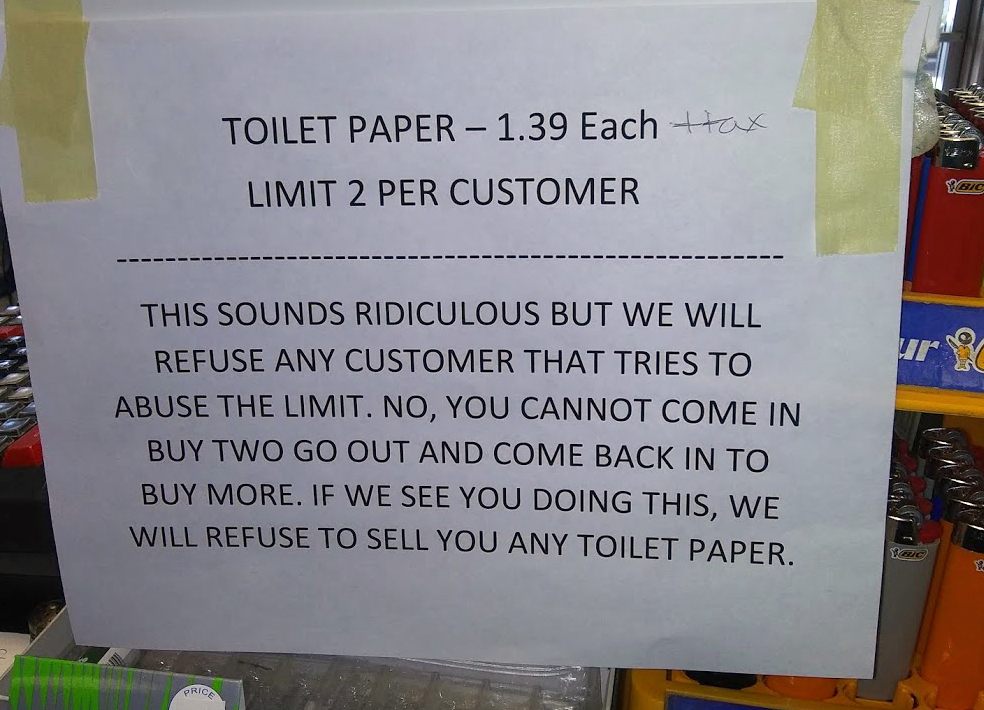
Sign warning customers not to circumvent limits on toilet paper purchases at an upstate New York convenience store

The viral outbreak was cited by many companies in their briefings to shareholders, but several maintained confidence that they would not be too adversely affected by short-term disruption due to "limited" exposure to the Chinese consumer market. Those with manufacturing lines in mainland China warned about possible exposure to supply shortages, while others cautioned that large corporations and the wealthy could exploit the crisis for economic gain in line with the Shock Doctrine, as has occurred after past pandemics

Silicon Valley representatives expressed worries about serious disruption to production lines, as much of the technology sector relies on factories in mainland China. Since there had been a scheduled holiday over Lunar New Year, the full effects of the outbreak on the tech sector were considered to be unknown as of 31 January 2020, according to The Wall Street Journal.

Cities with high populations of Chinese residents have seen an increase in demand for face masks to protect against the virus; many are purchasing masks to mail to relatives in China, where there is a shortage of masks. As of February 2020, many stores in the United States had sold out of masks. This mask shortage has caused an increase in prices.

Universities in the United States have warned about a significant impact on their income due to a large number of Chinese international students potentially unable to attend classes.

The Washington Post reported in February that President Donald Trump told advisors that he did not want the government to say or do anything that might spook the stock market, on concerns a large-scale outbreak could hurt his reelection chances.

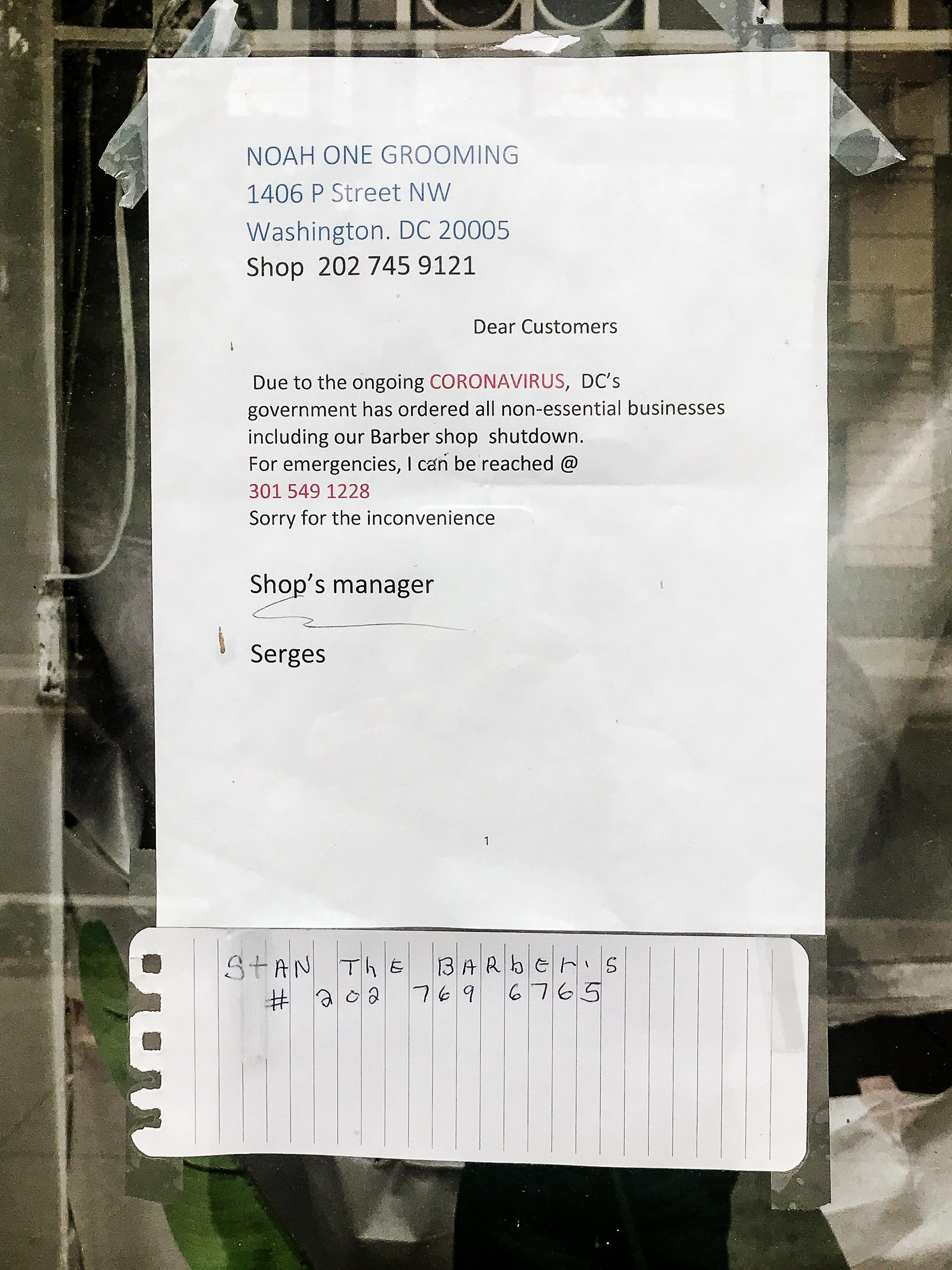
Closed barber on P St NW in Washington, DC

On 27 February, a report by Goldman Sachs forecast that it believes American companies "would generate no earnings growth in 2020," wiping out an earnings recovery that was expected for the year after "lackluster profit reports for most of 2019"

On 27 February, U.S. stocks were on their way to the largest loss for a week since 2008, and the Dow Jones Industrial Average fell 1190 points in one day. On 28 February the average dropped below 25000 briefly. The Dow Jones ended the week down 12.4 percent, the S&P 500 Index 11.5 percent, and the Nasdaq Composite down 10.5 percent. Stocks fell to 18,592 points (Dow average) on 23 March after a procedural Senate vote on a coronavirus economic stimulus bill failed for the second time in two days.

On 7 March, US stocks fell by 7 percent, triggering a temporary halt in trading, which was also aided by the 2020 Russia–Saudi Arabia oil price war.

On the evening of 11 March, the National Basketball Association announced that the rest of its season would be suspended indefinitely, and the National Collegiate Athletic Association (NCAA) announced that its men's and women's basketball tournaments would be played without fans. The following day, the NCAA announced that all championship events throughout all sports would be cancelled until 2020–21.

In April, nearly a quarter of residents (renters and homeowners) did not pay full housing costs. Some did not pay rent/mortgage at all, while others did not make full payment. The difficulties experienced by many tenants during the pandemic have sparked a movement to cancel rent, which is advocated by some activists, organizations, and politicians.

According to the US Bureau of Labor Statistics, male unemployment increased sharply from 3.55 million in February to 11 million in April 2020, while female unemployment (lower than the pre-crisis men's) rose from 2.7 million to 11.5 million in the same period.

In early May, a Washington Post-Ipsos poll revealed racial disparities between adult workers who were laid off or furloughed since the beginning of the outbreak: layoffs affected 20 percent of Hispanic workers, 16 percent of black workers, 11 percent of white workers, and 12 percent of workers of other races.

Many workers were furloughed or laid off as a result of business and school closures and the cancellation of public events. During April more than 20 million Americans filed for unemployment insurance, an all-time record, and the national unemployment rate was reported as 14.7% – the highest monthly rate since record keeping was begun in 1948. The rise in unemployment may have contributed to protracted nationwide civil unrest.

For first quarter 2020, health care spending dropped 18 percent. 42,000 health care workers lost their jobs in March, and 1.4 million in April, as most hospitals postponed non-essential procedures. People who were left ended up doing the jobs of others who were furloughed.

Although the United States government is the world's largest borrower, credit card debt in the country fell below $1 trillion in May 2020 for the first time since May 2011, declining for the previous three months. This was due to a decrease in both personal income and disposible personal income while personal savings rates nearly doubled. A job reports validated the decline after indicating that three million jobs were added in June 2020, compared to the 20 million jobs lost throughout the pandemic.

In a Business Economics article published on 7 December 2020, Xiaobing Shu, Christine Chmura & James Stinchcomb claimed that "COVID-19 has caused a significant decline in labor demand, by as much as 30%, measured by the number of job advertisements. But the pandemic did not result in noticeable changes in advertised wages."

In December 2020, economist David Choi at Goldman Sachs argued that the U.S. economy would recover faster than expected as impact on the parts of the economy most susceptible to the recent coronavirus spread weren't being affected as severely. On the flipside, Alejandra Grindal at Ned Davis Research, argued that the economy could get worse if the pandemic worsens prior to the deployment of vaccines in Q2 2021, after which the economy would see "a pretty sharp recovery not only in U.S. economic activity, but also global economic activity".

Nearly 20 million adults – 9 percent of all adults in the country – reported that their household sometimes or often didn't have enough to eat in the last seven days. Even consumers with jobs have stopped spending. Retail sales plunged 20 percent from February to April, with very large declines in categories like clothing and accessory stores (down 89 percent) and department stores (down 45 percent). The personal saving rate jumped to 33 percent in March from 8 percent in February.

Unemployment increased significantly in the United States during the COVID-19 pandemic. However, in the United States, most enterprises that adopted advanced digital technologies were able to avert worker reductions more significantly than firms who did not digitally adapt.

=== South America ===
Latin American and Caribbean countries were already facing low economic growth before COVID-19, with the region averaging 0.4% of growth in 2019, due to what was described as "a vicious circle of low-quality jobs, deficient social protection and volatile incomes" with one out of five in the ages of 14–25 being unable to find a job. The economic impact caused by COVID-19 was exacerbated by many countries' lack of reserve funds for times of crisis. Between 35 and 50 million people in the region are expected to fall below the poverty line, which is set at US$5.60 per day. Exports have also been affected and many countries are expected to fall further into debt. The LAC region is experiencing the biggest contraction in the emerging markets and developing economies. The IMF World Economic Outlook has reported a GDP contraction of 8.1 per cent in Latin America in 2020. Unfortunately, since 2014, the region has been experiencing the weakest period of growth since 1950.

A World Bank April 2024 report emphasizes the crucial role of competition in stimulating economic growth. The report highlights that in many regions, including Latin America and the Caribbean, high market concentration is a significant issue, with the top 10% of firms controlling about 70% of the market share. This stifles innovation and limits productivity gains necessary for robust economic development. By enhancing competition, the report estimates that consumer welfare could see substantial improvements and firms' productivity might increase by up to 50%. Additionally, this could contribute to an overall economic growth boost of approximately 3–4%.

Furthermore, the report updates on economic forecasts, noting a downward adjustment from an initial growth prediction of 2.3% to 1.6% for the year. It suggests that strategic reforms aimed at promoting fair competition, coupled with investments in infrastructure and education, are crucial for unlocking potential growth and improving economic outcomes. These measures are intended to address structural inefficiencies and ensure a more dynamic market environment conducive to long-term stability and prosperity.

The pandemic caused an increased of the degree of illegal mining in South America. The causes of this is the disruption of precious metal supply caused by anti-Covid measures in legal mines, and increased gold prices and a surge in unemployment.

==== Argentina ====
On 19 March, Argentina entered a nationwide lockdown. In response to the economic halt, on 24 March, the executive decreed the payment of a one-time welfare benefit to the lowest earning self-employed taxpayers left with no sources of income in their household.

On 22 September, official reports showed a record 19% year-on-year drop in the GDP for the second quarter of 2020, the biggest drop in the country's history. Investment fell 38% from the previous year.

==== Brazil ====
Two Brazilian banks predicted the deceleration of economic growth in China. UBS has reviewed its estimations from 6% to 5.9%, while Itaú stated a reduction to 5.8%.

A representative of some of the bigger Brazilian companies of the electronics sector, Eletros, stated that the current stock for the supply of components is enough for around 10 to 15 days.

The prices of soybeans, oil, and iron ore have been falling. These three goods represent 30%, 24% and 21% of the Brazilian exports to China, respectively.

==== Chile ====
Aiding Chile's downfall is reduced demand for copper from the US and China due to COVID-19.

=== Africa ===
Prior to the pandemic, average public debt in Africa was predicted to progressively drop. Instead, average net government debt increased by 2 percentage points in 2020, reaching 61% GDP. The surge in Sub-Saharan Africa was significantly greater, with over 6 percentage points on average. Countries are suffering increasing debt payment expenses as a result of this rising debt burden. Some countries have lost complete access to the global markets thus becoming reliant on relatively limited internal resources and concessional finance.

One of the responses of Africa's microfinance institutions to the COVID-19 crisis was to increase reliance on digital channels to support borrowers.

The European Investment Bank, with the help of the Making Finance Work for Africa Partnership (MFW4A), conducted the Banking in Africa survey in early 2021. 78 banks in Sub-Saharan Africa were surveyed. The banks that took part control nearly 30% of the continent's assets. The results showed that almost two-thirds of the Banks surveyed tightened lending rules in 2020 – 2021. More than 80% expanded their restructuring or loan moratoriums.

According to the European Investment Bank's Banking in Africa study 2021, digital offerings by Sub-Saharan African banks are increasing, especially as a result of the COVID-19 pandemic. The majority of the banks polled said that the pandemic has accelerated the speed of digital transformation, and that this change is permanent. 89% of the banks polled claimed that the pandemic has hastened the digital transformation of their internal operations; the same percentage believes that the consumer movement toward digital channels would continue once the virus has ended. Few banks were required to modify their employee levels, while slightly under one-third adjusted their prices. Approximately half of the answering banks had employed guarantees, the majority of which came from the central bank, the government, or an international financial institution. During the first half of 2020, the cost of overseas borrowing climbed dramatically. However, at the beginning of the pandemic, banks were well capitalized, thus they were able to resist liquidity challenges.

Around 88% of enterprises in countries where COVID-19 follow-up surveys were conducted (three in Southern Africa, one in East Africa, four in West Africa, and one in North Africa) were suffering diminished liquidity, with more than 55% of them closing temporarily during the COVID-19 pandemic. Almost 8% had declared bankruptcy, and 26% of enterprises are past due on financial institution commitments. Firms that depend on equity are at 36%. rather than depending on commercial bank loans to address cash flow issues, these are more likely to succeed at 16%.

The International Monetary Fund predicts that average growth in the African continent would return to 4.5% in 2021 and 4.0% in 2022. All economies except the Comoros are expected to increase in 2021. However, large differences in growth rates are expected, between 0.2% in the Republic of the Congo and 7.6% in Kenya in 2021.

=== Oceania ===
==== Australia ====
Early estimations have Australian GDP contracting by 0.2% to 0.5% and more than 20,000 Australian jobs being lost. The Australian Treasurer, Josh Frydenberg said that the country would no longer be able to promise a budget surplus due to the outbreak. The Australian dollar dropped to its lowest value since the Great Recession.

A large amount of protective face masks were purchased by foreign and domestic buyers, which has sparked a nationwide face masks shortage. In response to price increases of nearly 2000%, the Pharmaceutical Society of Australia has called on these "unethical suppliers" to keep supplies affordable.

Tourism bodies have suggested that the total economic cost to the sector, as of 11 February 2020, would be A$4.5 billion. Casino earnings are expected to fall. At least two localities in Australia, Cairns and the Gold Coast, have reported already lost earnings of more than $600 million. The Australian Tourism Industry Council called on the Government of Australia for financial support especially in light of the large number of small businesses affected.

Mining companies are thought to be highly exposed to the outbreak, since sales to China constitute 93% of the sales of Fortescue, 55% of the sales of BHP, and 45% of the sales of Rio Tinto. The iron ore shipping gauge dropped 99.9% as a result of the outbreak, and the virus has made shipping and logistic operations of mining companies more complicated.

Agriculture is also experiencing negative effects from the outbreak, including the Australian dairy industry, fishing industry, wine producers, and meat producers. On 13 February 2020, Rabobank, which specialised in agricultural banking, warned that the agricultural sector had eight weeks for the coronavirus to be contained before facing major losses. Exports were also affected by the outbreak. In May, China, Australia's largest trading partner, stopped accepting Australian meat and placed tariffs on Australian barley, likely a punitive response to Australia's call for an investigation into the origin of the global pandemic.

The education sector is expected to suffer a US$5 billion loss according to an early government estimate, including costs due to "tuition fee refunds, free deferral of study, realignment of teaching calendars and student accommodation costs." The taxpayer is likely to be required to cover the shortfall in education budgets. An estimated 100,000 students were not able to enroll at the start of the semester. Nearly two-thirds of Chinese students were forced to remain overseas due to visa restrictions.

== See also ==
- Financial market impact of the COVID-19 pandemic
- Shortages related to the COVID-19 pandemic
