= List of companies in the Chicago metropolitan area =

Companies in the Chicago metropolitan area in USA

This is a list of companies in the Chicago metropolitan area. The Chicago metropolitan area – also known as "Chicagoland" – is the metropolitan area associated with the city of Chicago, Illinois, and its suburbs. With an estimated population of 9.4 million people, it is the third largest metropolitan area in the United States and the region most connected to the city through geographic, social, economic, and cultural ties.

== Architecture and engineering ==
- Adrian Smith + Gordon Gill Architecture (Chicago)
- Aecom (Chicago)
- Collins Engineers (Chicago)
- Cordogan Clark & Associates (Chicago)
- Corgan (Chicago)
- CTLGroup (Skokie)
- Graham, Anderson, Probst & White (Chicago)
- Hedrich Blessing Photographers (Chicago)
- Holabird & Root (Chicago)
- Kirkegaard Associates (Chicago)
- Krueck Sexton Partners (Chicago)
- Lucien Lagrange Architects (Chicago)
- Nagle Hartray Architecture (Chicago)
- Perkins&Will (Chicago)
- SmithGroup (Chicago)
- Solomon Cordwell Buenz (Chicago)
- SOM (Chicago)
- Studio Gang Architects (Chicago)
- UrbanLab (Chicago)
- Wiss, Janney, Elstner Associates (Northbrook)

=== Construction ===
- Bulley & Andrews (Chicago)
- Edward Hines Lumber Company (Buffalo Grove)
- Great Lakes Dredge and Dock Company (Oak Brook)
- James McHugh Construction Co (Chicago)

=== Real estate ===
- Baird & Warner (Chicago)
- Brookfield Properties (Chicago)
- CenterPoint Properties (Oak Brook)
- Cushman & Wakefield (Chicago)
- Fordham Company (Chicago)
- JLL (Chicago)
- JMB Realty (Chicago)
- Magellan Development Group (Chicago)
- Strategic Hotels & Resorts (Chicago)
- Ventas (Chicago)
- Vivmark Residential (Chicago)

== Consumer ==
=== Consumer goods ===
==== Apparel and accessories ====
- Acme Boots, a unit of Double-H Boots (Chicago)
- Chicago Embroidery Company (Chicago)
- Claire's (Hoffman Estates)
- Hartmarx (Chicago)
- Horween Leather Company (Chicago)
- Islamica (Chicago)
- Jockey International (Kenosha)
- Oxxford Clothes (Chicago)
- Lola + The Boys (Chicago)

==== Gifts and collectables ====
- Bradford Exchange (Niles)
- Enesco (Itasca)
- International Star Registry (Ingleside)
- Recycled Paper Greetings (Chicago)

==== Home furnishings and equipment ====
- BRK Brands, Inc. (Aurora), a subsidiary of Newell Brands
  - First Alert (Aurora)
- Chamberlain Group (Elmhurst)
- Chicago Faucet (Des Plaines)
- Chicago Lock (Chicago)
- Design Toscano (Elk Grove Village)
- Fortune Brands Home & Security (Deerfield)
- Haeger Potteries (East Dundee)
- Rust-Oleum (Vernon Hills)
- Serta (Hoffman Estates)
- Walter E. Smithe (Itasca)

==== Household goods ====
- Crate & Barrel (Northbrook, Illinois)
- Pactiv (Lake Forest)
- Pampered Chef (Addison)
- Reynolds Group Holdings (Lincolnshire)
- Solo Cup Company (Lake Forest), a subsidiary of Dart Container
- Thermos L.L.C. (Schaumburg)
- Turtle Wax (Willowbrook)
- Weber-Stephen Products (Palatine)

==== Music equipment ====
- Bein & Fushi (Chicago)
- Lyon & Healy (Chicago)
- Marshall USA (Buffalo Grove), a subsidiary of Marshall Amplification
- Shure Incorporated (Niles)
- Souldier
- Specimen Products (Chicago)
- U.S. Music Corporation (Buffalo Grove)
- Universal Audio (Evanston)

==== Personal care ====
- Blistex, Incorporated (Oak Brook)
- Ulta Beauty (Bolingbrook)

==== Restaurants ====
- Lettuce Entertain You (Chicago)
- Lou Malnati's (Buffalo Grove)
- McDonald's (Chicago)
- Portillo's (Oak Brook)
- Potbelly Sandwich Shop (Chicago)

==== Tools ====
- Klein Tools (Lincolnshire)
- SK Hand Tools (Sycamore)
- Vaughan (Hebron)

=== Education and reference ===
- Academy Chicago Publishers – one of the oldest independent publishers in Chicago
- Adtalem Global Education (Chicago)
- BarBri (Chicago)
- Bixbee (Chicago)
- Career Education Corporation (Hoffman Estates)
- DeVry University (Naperville)
- Encyclopædia Britannica, Inc. (Chicago)
- Follett Corporation (River Grove)
- Kendall College, LLC (Chicago)
- PrepMe (Chicago)
- Rand McNally (Skokie), a subsidiary of Quebecor World
- Replogle (Chicago)
- Riverside Publishing (Rolling Meadows)
- Tribeca Flashpoint Media Arts Academy (Chicago)
- World Book Encyclopedia (Chicago)
- WyzAnt (Chicago)

=== Retail ===
==== Art supplies ====
- Blick Art Materials (Highland Park)

==== Broadlines ====
- Sears Holdings Corporation (Hoffman Estates)
- SuperValu Pharmacies (Franklin Park)
- Walgreens Boots Alliance (Deerfield)
  - Walgreen Company (Deerfield)

==== Business-to-business ====
- CDW (Vernon Hills)
- McMaster-Carr (Elmhurst)
- Orderzone.com (Chicago)
- W. W. Grainger (Lake Forest)

==== Electronics ====
- Abt Electronics (Glenview)

==== Florists ====
- Florists' Transworld Delivery (FTD) (Downers Grove)

==== Grocery/convenience ====
- Aldi Inc. (Batavia), a subsidiary of Aldi
- Clark Brands (Naperville)
- IGA (Chicago)
- Jewel-Osco (Itasca), a subsidiary of Albertsons
- Patel Brothers (Hanover Park)
- Peapod (Skokie), a subsidiary of Ahold Delhaize
- Road Ranger (Schaumburg)

==== Hardware ====
- Ace Hardware (Oak Brook)
- True Value (Chicago)
- Val-Test Distributors (Schaumburg)

==== Office supplies and stationery ====
- ACCO Brands (Lake Zurich)
- Cartridge World (Spring Grove), a subsidiary of Suzhou Goldengreen Technologies Ltd
- Essendant (Deerfield)
- Fellowes, Inc. (Itasca)
- Paper Source (Chicago)
- Quill Corporation (Lincolnshire) a subsidiary of Staples, Inc.
- Sanford L.P. (Oak Brook), a subsidiary of Newell Brands

==== Softlines ====
- Bucketfeet (Chicago)
- Claire's Stores (Hoffman Estates)
- Crate & Barrel (Northbrook)
- The Land of Nod (Northbrook)
- The Pampered Chef (Addison)
- Threadless (Chicago)
- Ulta (Bolingbrook)

=== Services ===
- The Care of Trees (Wheeling)
- Disaster Kleenup International (Wood Dale)
- Empire Today (Northlake)
- Leslie Hindman Auctioneers (Chicago)
- Midas (Itasca), a subsidiary of TBC Corporation

=== Sports, games, and toys ===
- Bally Total Fitness (Chicago)
- Big Monster Toys (Chicago)
- Brunswick Corporation (Lake Forest)
- Cards Against Humanity (Chicago)
- FASA (Chicago)
- International Pool Tour (Hinsdale)
- Kenzer & Company (Waukegan)
- Killerspin (Chicago)
- Radio Flyer (Chicago)
- Revell (Elk Grove Village)
- Riddell (Des Plaines)
- SRAM Corporation (Chicago)
- Stern (Melrose Park)
- TDC Games (Itasca)
- Ty Inc. (Westmont)
- Wilson Sporting Goods (Chicago), a subsidiary of Amer Sports Corporation
- Wirtz Corp. (Chicago)
- Zizzle (Bannockburn)

== Energy ==
- Amoco (Chicago)
- Coskata (Warrenville)
- DuPont Danisco (Itasca)
- Exelon (Chicago)
- Integrys Energy Group (Chicago)
- New Power Generation International
- Nicor (Naperville)
- NiSource (Merrillville)
- Honeywell UOP (Des Plaines)

== Financial services ==
=== Banks ===
- Alliant Credit Union (Chicago)
- Amalgamated Bank of Chicago (Chicago)
- BMO US (Chicago)
- First American Bank (Elk Grove Village)
- Northern Trust (Chicago)
- Old National Bank (Chicago)
- Pacific Global Bank (Chicago)
- Urban Partnership Bank (Chicago)

=== Credit and payments ===
- Avant (Chicago)
- Braintree (Chicago)
- DigitalMint (Chicago)
- E-Loan (Rosemont)
- Feefighters (Chicago)
- Guaranteed Rate (Chicago)
- HSBC Finance, a subsidiary of HSBC (Mettawa)
- SVM (Des Plaines)
- TransUnion (Chicago)

=== Exchanges ===
- Cboe Global Markets (Chicago)
- Chicago Stock Exchange (Chicago)
- CME Group (Chicago)
- Nadex (Chicago)
- OneChicago (Chicago)
- Options Clearing Corporation (Chicago)
- U.S. Futures Exchange (Chicago)

=== Insurance ===
- Allstate (Northfield Township)
- Arthur J. Gallagher & Co. (Rolling Meadows)
- Bankers Life (Chicago)
- Blue Cross Blue Shield Association (Chicago)
- CNA Financial (Chicago) (an affiliate of Loews Corporation)
- Combined Insurance (Chicago)
- Eagle Insurance (Chicago)
- Health Care Service Corporation (Chicago)
- Hub International (Chicago)
- Kemper Corporation (Chicago)
  - Kemper Direct
- Old Republic International (Chicago)
- Safeway Insurance Group (Westmont)

=== Investments ===
- Ariel Investments (Chicago)
- Calamos (Naperville)
- Chicago Options Associates (Chicago)
- Gardner Rich & Co (Chicago)
- Harris Associates (Chicago)
- Henry Crown and Company (Chicago)
- Incapital (Chicago)
- Lincoln International (Chicago)
- Mesirow Financial (Chicago)
- Morningstar, Inc. (Chicago)
- Nuveen Investments (Chicago)
- PTI Securities & Futures (Chicago)
- William Blair & Company (Chicago)

=== Private equity and hedge funds ===
- Chicago Growth Partners (Chicago)
- CIVC Partners (Chicago)
- Frontenac Company (Chicago)
- GCM Grosvenor (Chicago)
- GETCO (Chicago)
- GTCR (Chicago)
- Guggenheim Partners (Chicago)
- Lightbank (Chicago)
- Madison Dearborn Partners (Chicago)
- Magnetar Capital (Evanston)
- TransMarket Group (Chicago)
- Willis Stein & Partners (Chicago)
- Wind Point Partners (Chicago)

== Food and beverages ==
=== Beverages ===
- 5 Rabbit Cervecería (Bedford Park)
- A.J. Canfield Company (Chicago)
- Argus Brewery (Chicago)
- Baderbräu (Chicago)
- Suntory Global Spirits (Chicago)
- Culligan (Rosemont)
- Goose Island Brewery (Chicago)
- Half Acre Beer Company (Chicago)
- Intelligentsia Coffee & Tea (Chicago)
- Koval Distillery (Chicago)
- Metropolis Coffee Company (Chicago)
- Metropolitan Brewing (Chicago)
- MillerCoors (Chicago)
- Pabst Brewing Company (Woodridge)
- Pipeworks Brewing (Chicago)
- Tropicana Products (Chicago)
- Two Brothers Brewing (Warrenville)

=== Distribution ===
- Central Grocers Cooperative (Joliet)
- Chicago International Produce Market (Chicago)
- Eby-Brown (Naperville)
- Republic Tobacco (Glenview)
- Reyes Holdings (Rosemont)
- Topco Associates (Elk Grove Village)
- US Foods (Rosemont)

=== Food ===
- Allen Brothers (Chicago)
- Bernard Food Industries (Evanston)
- Budlong Pickle Company (Chicago)
- Cloverhill Bakery (Chicago)
- Colonial Ice Cream (St. Charles)
- Conagra Brands (Chicago)
- Doumak (Elk Grove Village)
- Fannie May, a unit of 1-800-Flowers (Chicago)
- Ferrara Candy Company (Forest Park)
- Glanbia (Chicago)
- Haribo (Rosemont)
- Hillshire Brands (Chicago)
- Jays Foods (Chicago)
- Jel Sert (West Chicago)
- Kraft Heinz (Chicago and Pittsburgh, Pennsylvania)
  - Kraft Foods Group, Inc. (Northfield)
- Mead Johnson Nutrition (Glenview)
- Mondelez International (Deerfield)
- Oberweis Dairy (North Aurora)
- Parker House Sausage Company (Chicago)
- Plochman's (Manteno)
- Quaker Oats Company, a unit of PepsiCo (Chicago)
- Strom Products (Bannockburn)
- Tootsie Roll Industries (Chicago)
- Vanee Foods (Berkeley)
- Vienna Beef (Chicago)
- Wm. Wrigley Jr. Company (Chicago)
- World's Finest Chocolate (Chicago)

=== Ingredients ===
- Bell Flavors & Fragrances (Chicago)
- Ingredion (Westchester)
- Merisant (Chicago)
- Morton Salt (Chicago)
- Urban Accents (Chicago)

=== Manufacturing ===
- Archer Daniels Midland (Chicago)
- CF Industries (Deerfield)
- Viskase (Darien)
- Woman's Canning and Preserving Company (Chicago)

=== Restaurant chains ===
- Amy's Candy Bar (Chicago)
- Argo Tea (Chicago)
- Big Apple Bagels (Deerfield)
- Cake Girls (Chicago)
- Così (Deerfield)
- Flat Out Crazy (Chicago)
- Giordano's Pizzeria
- The Great American Bagel Bakery (Westmont)
- Harold's Chicken Shack (Chicago)
- Heartland Foods (Downers Grove)
- Kuma's Corner (Chicago)
- Lettuce Entertain You Enterprises (Chicago)
- Levy Restaurants (Chicago)
- McDonald's (Chicago)
- Monical's Pizza (Bradley)
- Morton's The Steakhouse (Chicago)
- Portillo's Restaurants (Oakbrook Terrace)
- Potbelly Sandwich Works (Chicago)

== Healthcare ==
=== Health services ===
- Cancer Treatment Centers of America (Schaumburg)
- Resurrection Health Care (Chicago)
- Vetsprevail (Chicago)
- Wheaton Franciscan Healthcare (Wheaton)

=== Pharmaceuticals and medical devices ===
- Abbott Laboratories (North Chicago)
- AbbVie (Waukegan)
- Astellas Pharma (Northbrook)
- Baxter International (Deerfield)
- GE HealthCare (Chicago)
- Hospira (Lake Forest)
- Marathon Pharmaceuticals (Chicago)
- Takeda Pharmaceuticals (Deerfield)

=== Pharmacy ===
- Caremark Rx (Northbrook)
- Catamaran Corporation (Lisle)
- Walgreens (Deerfield)

=== Provider goods and services ===
- Accretive Health (Chicago)
- Allscripts (Chicago)
- Intelligent Medical Objects (Northbrook)
- Medline Industries (Mundelein)
- Stericycle (Lake Forest)

== Industrial ==
=== Agricultural equipment ===
- CNH (Burr Ridge)
- Dawn Equipment Company (Sycamore)

=== Automotive ===
- Electro-Motive Diesel (McCook)
- Hendrickson Holdings (Lemont; a subsidiary of The Boler Company (Itasca))
- LKQ Corporation (Chicago)
- Raybestos (McHenry)
- Tenneco (Lake Forest)

=== Building materials ===
- Amcol (Hoffman Estates)
- USG Corporation (Chicago)

=== Chemicals ===
- Stepan Company (Northfield)
- Velsicol Chemical Corporation (Rosemont)

=== Glass ===
- Engineered Glass Products (Chicago)
- Thermique Technologies (Chicago)

=== Metals ===
- Ecycler (Lake Forest)
- Metal Management (Chicago)
- Ryerson, Inc. (Chicago)

=== Packaging ===
- Continental Packaging Solutions (Chicago)
- Packaging Corporation of America (Lake Forest)
- Smurfit-Stone Container (Chicago)
- Uline (Pleasant Prairie)

=== Plumbing and piping ===
- John Crane Inc. (Morton Grove)
- Sloan Valve Company (Franklin Park)

=== Tools ===
- Armstrong Tools (Chicago)
- Ideal Industries (Sycamore)
- Illinois Tool Works (Glenview)
- Snap-on (Kenosha)

=== Other ===
- A and T Recovery (Chicago)
- Cummins Allison (Mount Prospect)
- Dover Corporation (Downers Grove)
- Federal Signal Corporation (Oak Brook)
- The Frantz Manufacturing Company (Chicago)
- IDEX Corporation (Lake Forest)
- JBT Corporation (Chicago)
- Marmon Group (Chicago)
- Nalco Holding Company (Naperville)
- Switchcraft (Chicago)
- Tripp Lite (Chicago)
- World Dryer (Berkeley; a subsidiary of Carrier Commercial Refrigeration)

== Media and entertainment ==
=== Entertainment ===
- Broadway In Chicago (Chicago)
- Kerasotes Theatres (Chicago)
- Redbox Automated Retail, LLC (Oakbrook Terrace)

=== Music ===
- Alligator Records (Chicago)
- Atavistic Records (Chicago)
- Bloodshot Records (Chicago)
- Cedille Records (Chicago)
- Chicago Recording Company (Chicago)
- Criminal IQ Records (Chicago)
- Delmark Records (Chicago)
- Drag City (Chicago)
- Earwig Music Company (Chicago)
- Epitonic (Chicago)
- Flying Fish Records (Chicago)
- Get Money Gang Entertainment (Chicago)
- Glitch Mode Recordings (Chicago)
- Hefty Records (Chicago)
- Invisible Records (Chicago)
- Johann's Face Records (Chicago)
- Lengua Armada Discos (Chicago)
- Lo-Fidelity Records (Naperville)
- Minty Fresh (Chicago)
- Positron! Records (Chicago)
- Sick Room Records (Chicago)
- Thick Records (Chicago)
- Thrill Jockey (Chicago)
- Touch and Go Records (Chicago)
- Victory Records (Chicago)

=== Online ===
- Channel Awesome (Lombard)
- College Football News (Chicago)
- Consequence of Sound (Chicago)
- HighBeam Research (Chicago)
- Jellyvision (Chicago)
- Legacy.com (Evanston)
- MuggleNet (LaPorte)
- Newsweb Corporation (Chicago)
- The Onion (Chicago)
- Pitchfork Media (Chicago)

=== Publishing ===
- 22nd Century Media (Orland Park)
- Academy Chicago Publishers (Chicago)
- Allured Business Media (Carol Stream)
- American Technical Publishers (Orland Park)
- Carus Publishing Company (Chicago)
- Chicago Reader (Chicago)
- Daily Herald (Arlington Heights)
- Desplaines Valley News (Summit)
- Farm Progress (St. Charles)
- Good News Publishers (Wheaton)
- Goodheart–Willcox (Tinley Park)
- Haymarket Books (Chicago)
- Johnson Publishing Company (Chicago)
- Metromix (Chicago)
- Northwestern University Press (Evanston)
- Open Court Publishing Company (Chicago)
- Pink (Chicago)
- RR Donnelley (Chicago)
- Sourcebooks (Naperville)
- Star Farm Productions (Chicago)
- Sun-Times Media Group (Chicago)
- Third World Press (Chicago)
- Tribune Company (Chicago)
- Tyndale House (Carol Stream)
- University of Chicago Press (Chicago)
- Venture (Chicago)
- Wrapports (Chicago)

=== TV, film, and radio ===
- Barrington Broadcasting (Hoffman Estates)
- Big Ten Network (Chicago)
- Fensler Films (Chicago)
- Graham Media Group (Chicago)
- Harpo Productions (Chicago)
- Midway Broadcasting Corporation (Chicago)
- Moody Radio (Chicago)
- MPI Home Video (Orland Park)
- NBC Sports Chicago (Chicago)
- Oprah Winfrey Network (Chicago)
- The Second City (Chicago)
- Siskel/Jacobs Productions (Chicago)
- Tribune Broadcasting (Chicago)
- Weigel Broadcasting (Chicago)
- WGN America (Chicago)

== Professional and business services ==
=== Accounting ===
- Baker Tilly International
- BDO USA
- Crowe Global
- Grant Thornton LLP (Oakbrook Terrace)
- RSM US

=== Design ===
- Design Museum of Chicago (Chicago)
- Product Development Technologies (Lake Zurich)

=== Legal ===
- Baker McKenzie (Chicago)
- Banner & Witcoff (Chicago)
- Bartlit Beck Herman Palenchar & Scott (Chicago)
- Edelson McGuire (Chicago)
- Fitch, Even, Tabin & Flannery (Chicago)
- Hinshaw & Culbertson (Chicago)
- Horwitz Horwitz & Associates (Chicago)
- Jenner & Block (Chicago)
- Katten Muchin Rosenman (Chicago)
- Kirkland & Ellis (Chicago)
- Locke Lord (Chicago)
- Mayer Brown (Chicago)
- McAndrews, Held & Malloy (Chicago)
- McDermott Will & Emery (Chicago)
- People's Law Office (Chicago)
- Schiff Hardin (Chicago)
- Seyfarth Shaw (Chicago)
- Sidley Austin (Chicago)
- Winston & Strawn (Chicago)

=== Management consulting ===
- A.T. Kearney (Chicago)
- Accenture (Chicago)
- Boston Consulting Group (Chicago)
- Huron Consulting Group (Chicago)
- McKinsey (Chicago)
- Navigant Consulting, Inc. (Chicago)

=== Marketing and public relations ===
- 360i (Chicago)
- A. Eicoff & Company (Chicago)
- AKPD Message and Media (Chicago)
- Burrell Communications Group (Chicago)
- 360i (Chicago)
- Cramer-Krasselt (Chicago)
- Draftfcb (Chicago)
- Edelman (Chicago)
- Epsilon (Chicago)
- Havas (Chicago)
- IP Pixel (Chicago)
- IRI (Chicago)
- Laughlin Constable (Chicago)
- Leo Burnett Worldwide (Chicago)
- Public Communications Inc. (Chicago)
- Roundarch Isobar (Chicago)
- Shareasale (Chicago)
- ShopLocal (Chicago)
- Someoddpilot (Chicago)
- Starcom (Chicago)
- Strata (Chicago)
- Whittman-Hart (Chicago)

=== Recruiting, human resources and payroll ===
- Aon Hewitt (Lincolnshire)
- Challenger, Gray & Christmas (Chicago)
- Paylocity Corporation (Schaumburg)
- Spencer Stuart (Chicago)
- SurePayroll (Glenview)

=== Technology consulting ===
- Forsythe Technology (Skokie)

== Technology ==
=== Distribution ===
- Anixter (Glenview)

=== Hardware ===
- Andrew Corporation (Westchester)
- Convia (Buffalo Grove)
- Neuros Technology (Chicago)
- Newark Corporation (Chicago)
- Shure (Niles)
- Victor Technology (Bolingbrook)
- Zebra Technologies (Vernon Hills)
- Zenith Electronics (Lincolnshire; a subsidiary of South Korea-based LG Electronics)

=== Internet ===
- CareerBuilder (Chicago)
- Cars.com (Chicago)
- CheapTickets (Chicago)
- crowdSPRING (Chicago)
- Groupon (Chicago)
- GrubHub (Chicago)
- Orbitz (Chicago)
- Orderzone.com (Chicago)
- ParkWhiz (Chicago)
- Peapod (Skokie)
- SilkRoad (Chicago)
- Sittercity.com (Chicago)
- SpotHero (Chicago)
- TicketsNow (Rolling Meadows)
- UBid (Chicago)
- Vivid Seats (Chicago)

=== Manufacturing ===
- Littelfuse (Chicago)
- Molex (Lisle)

=== Services ===
- Adar, Inc (Chicago)
- LiveWatch Security (Evanston)
- Translate.com (Chicago)
- Trustwave Holdings (Chicago)
- Underwriters Laboratories (Northbrook)

=== Software ===
- Adeptia (Chicago)
- Basecamp (Chicago)
- BigMachines (Deerfield)
- CDK Global (Hoffman Estates)
- Computhink (Lombard)
- Davka (Chicago)
- Donnelley Financial Solutions (Chicago)
- Flexera Software (Schaumburg)
- John Galt Solutions, Inc. (Chicago)
- Latigent (Chicago)
- OneSpan (Chicago)
- Passport Software (Northfield)
- RemObjects Software (Hanover Park)
- Springcm (Chicago)
- ThoughtWorks (Chicago)
- Univa (Lisle)

=== Telecommunications and networking ===
- Aircell (Itasca)
- CacheFly (Chicago)
- Gogo Inflight Internet (Itasca)
- Hostway (Chicago)
- Motorola Mobility (Chicago)
- Motorola Solutions (Schaumburg)
- Novarra Inc. (Itasca)
- ServerCentral (Chicago)
- Steadfast Networks (Chicago)
- Telephone and Data Systems (Chicago)
- Tellabs (Naperville)
- U.S. Cellular (Chicago)
- USRobotics (Schaumburg)
- Westell (Aurora)

=== Video games ===
- American Sammy (Chicago)
- Day 1 Studios (Chicago)
- Incredible Technologies (Vernon Hills)
- Iron Galaxy Studios (Chicago)
- Jellyvision Games (Chicago)
- Mountain King Studios (Chicago)
- Namco Cybertainment (Bensenville; a subsidiary of Japan-based Namco)
- NetherRealm Studios (Chicago)
- Robomodo (Chicago)
- WMS Industries (Waukegan)

== Travel and transportation ==
=== Aviation support ===
- AAR Corporation (Wood Dale)
- Covenant Aviation Security (Chicago)
- Jet Support Services, Inc. (Chicago)

=== Consumer travel ===
- Caravan Tours (Chicago)
- CheapTickets (Chicago)
- Chicago Trolley Company (Chicago)
- Hyatt (Chicago)
- Kokua Hospitality, LLC (Chicago)
- Orbitz (Chicago)
- United Airlines Holdings (Chicago)

=== Freight ===
- Hub Group (Oak Brook)
- Livingston International (Chicago)

=== Rail ===
- Anacostia Rail Holdings Company (Chicago)
- Chicago Union Station Company (Chicago)
- CRRC Sifang America (Chicago)
- FreightCar America (Chicago)
- GATX (Chicago)
- GE Transportation (Chicago)
- Iowa Pacific Holdings (Chicago)
- Rail World (Chicago)
- Transco Railway Products (Chicago)
- Union Tank Car Company (Chicago)

=== Road ===
- Donlen Corporation (Northbrook)
- Durham School Services (Warrenville)
- Motor Coach Industries (Schaumburg)
- National Van Lines, Inc. (Broadview)
- Navistar International (Lisle)
- ParkWhiz (Chicago)
- SpotHero (Chicago)
- Standard Parking (Chicago)
- Yellow Cab Company (Chicago)

=== Services ===
- American Hotel Register Company (Vernon Hills)

== Out of state and foreign companies with a major presence ==
There are other large corporations with an established presence in Chicago and/or its suburbs (but whose corporate headquarters are located elsewhere), including:

=== Autos ===
- BMW of North America Central Region Office (Schaumburg) (from Munich, Germany)
- Continental Automotive Systems (Temic) (Deer Park) (from Hanover, Germany)
- Ford Motor Company (Chicago Assembly, Chicago Heights Stamping) (from Detroit, Michigan, US)
- Hyundai Motor Company (Aurora) (from Seoul, South Korea)
- Nissan Forklift (Marengo) (from Yokohama, Japan)
- Nissan North America (Aurora) (from Yokohama, Japan)
- Subaru of America Regional Office - Central (Itasca) (from Tokyo, Japan)
- Toyota Motor Sales, U.S.A., Inc. (Aurora, Naperville) (from Toyota, Japan)

=== Consumer ===
- Bridgestone (Bridgestone Retail Operations, LLC) (Bloomingdale) (from Tokyo, Japan)
- Dyson USA (Chicago) (from Malmesbury, UK)
- Li-Ning (Chicago) (from Beijing, China)
- Medela (McHenry) (from Baar, Switzerland)
- Sunstar Americas (Schaumburg) (from Osaka, Japan)
- thinkorswim (Chicago) (from New York, New York, US)
- Valspar (from Minneapolis, Minnesota, US)

=== Energy ===
- BP (Warrenville, Naperville, Whiting) (from London, UK)
- Citgo (Lemont Refinery) (from Houston, Texas, US)
- Schneider Electric (Palatine) (from Rueil-Malmaison, France)

=== Financial services ===
- ABN AMRO Clearing (Chicago) (from Amsterdam, Netherlands)
- Aon Corporation Americas region headquarters (Chicago) (from London, UK)
- Bank of America (from Charlotte, North Carolina, US)
- BMO Harris Bank (Chicago), a subsidiary of Montreal-based Bank of Montreal
- Capital One (Rolling Meadows) (from Tysons Corner, Virginia, US)
- Experian (Schaumburg) (from Dublin, Ireland)
- Fitch Group (from New York, New York, US and London, UK)
- JPMorgan Chase (See: Bank One Corporation) (from New York, New York, US)
- Popular, Inc. (Banco Popular North America) (Rosemont) (from San Juan, PR, US)
- UBS (from Zurich, Switzerland)
- Willis Group (Chicago - Willis Tower) (from London, UK)
- XL Group (Chicago, Schaumburg) (from Dublin, Ireland)
- Zurich Financial Services (Schaumburg) (from Zurich, Switzerland)

=== Food, beverages and agriculture ===
- Ajinomoto (Ajinomoto Food Ingredients LLC & Ajinomoto Heartland LLC) (Chicago) (from Tokyo, Japan)
- Barilla Americas HQ (Northbrook) (from Parma, Italy)
- Butterball (Naperville) (from Garner, North Carolina, US)
- Cargill (Chicago, Hammond) (from Minnetonka, Minnesota, US)
- ConAgra Foods (Naperville) (from Omaha, Nebraska, US)
- Maple Leaf Foods (Des Plaines) (from Toronto, Ontario, Canada)
- Richelieu Foods (Elk Grove Village) (from Randolph, Massachusetts, US)
- Smithfield Foods (Armour-Eckrich Meats LLC) (Lisle and St. Charles) (from Smithfield, Virginia, US)

=== Healthcare and pharmaceuticals ===
- Astellas US LLC (Northbrook) (from Tokyo, Japan)
- Fresenius Kabi USA (Lake Zurich) (from Bad Homburg, Germany)
- Fujifilm Medical (Hanover Park) (from Tokyo, Japan)
- LifeWatch (Rosemont) (from Neuhausen am Rheinfall, Switzerland)
- McKesson Corporation (Wheeling) (from New York, New York, US)
- Siemens Healthcare U.S. headquarters (Deerfield) (from Munich, Germany)
- Takeda Pharmaceutical Company U.S. headquarters (Deerfield) (from Osaka, Japan)

=== Industrial ===
- AkzoNobel (Polymer Chemicals Unit) (from Amsterdam, Netherlands)
- Amada Co (Amada Machine Tools America) (Schaumburg) (from Kanagawa, Japan)
- ArcelorMittal (U.S. headquarters in Chicago; plants in Riverdale, East Chicago, and Burns Harbor) (from Luxembourg)
- Bystronic North America headquarters (Elgin) (from Niederönz, Switzerland)
- General Electric (from Schenectady, New York, US)
- Gerdau (plant in Joliet)
- Ineos/Innovene (Chicago, Naperville, Whiting) (from Rolle, Switzerland)
- James Hardie Industries U.S. headquarters (Chicago) (from Australia)
- Komatsu Limited U.S. headquarters (Rolling Meadows) (from Tokyo, Japan)
- Lafarge North America headquarters (Rosemont) (from Paris, France)
- Makino (Elgin) (from Tokyo, Japan)
- Mazak Midwest Technology Center (Schaumburg) (from Ōguchi, Japan)
- Misumi U.S. headquarters (Schaumburg) (from Tokyo, Japan)
- Mori Seiki U.S. headquarters (Hoffman Estates) (from Nagoya, Japan)
- Noritake (Arlington Heights) (from Nagoya, Japan)
- Rexam (Chicago, Buffalo Grove) (from London, UK)
- Ricardo plc (Burr Ridge) (from Shoreham-by-Sea, UK)
- Robert Bosch Corp. (Broadview (automotive aftermarket), Mount Prospect (production tools), Hoffman Estates (Bosch Rexroth)) (from Gerlingen, Germany)
- Rockwell Automation (Burr Ridge) (from Milwaukee, Wisconsin, US)
- Ryobi (Chicago) (from Hiroshima, Japan)
- Siemens Building Technologies U.S. headquarters (Buffalo Grove) (from Munich, Germany)
- SSAB North America (Lisle) (from Stockholm, Sweden)
- Subaru Industrial Power Products (Robin) (Lake Zurich) (from Tokyo, Japan)
- Sumitomo Corporation of America (Rosemont) (from Tokyo, Japan)
- Suzo Happ North America HQ (Elk Grove Village) (from Rotterdam, Netherlands)
- Tyco International (Tyco Electrical & Metal Products) (Harvey) (from Princeton, New Jersey, US)
- U.S. Steel (Gary Works) (Gary) (from Pittsburgh, Pennsylvania, US)
- Wanxiang Group U.S. headquarters (Elgin) (from Hangzhou, China
- Weichai Power (Rolling Meadows) (from Weifang, China
- Yaskawa Electric Corporation (Waukegan) (from Kitakyushu, Japan)
- ZF Friedrichshafen (Vernon Hills) (from Friedrichshafen, Germany)

=== Media ===
- ACNielsen North America HQ (Schaumburg) (from New York, New York, US)
- McGraw-Hill (Chicago) (from New York, New York, US)
- Pearson Education, publishing as Scott Foresman (Glenview) (from London, UK)

=== Professional services ===
- Acxiom (Downers Grove) (from Little Rock, Arkansas, US)
- Cision US HQ (Chicago) (from Stockholm, Sweden)
- Colliers International Midwest HQ (Chicago & Rosemont) (from Seattle)
- DigitasLBi (Chicago) (from New York City)
- Mintel (Chicago) (from London, UK)
- Paychex (Naperville) (from Penfield, New York, US)

=== Technology ===
- Affiliated Computer Services (ACS) (Schaumburg) (from Dallas, Texas, US)
- Alcatel-Lucent (from Paris, France)
- Amazon, Amazon Web Services
- AT&T Inc. (from Dallas, Texas, US)
- Canon USA (Itasca) (from Tokyo, Japan)
- Cognizant (Chicago, Lisle) (from Teaneck, New Jersey, US)
- FANUC (Hoffman Estates) (from Yamanashi, Japan)
- Google (Chicago) (from Mountain View, California)
- Hitachi High Technologies America (Schaumburg) (from Tokyo, Japan)
- Huawei (Rolling Meadows) (from Shenzhen, China)
- IBM (from Armonk, New York, US)
- Microsoft (Chicago, Downers Grove, Northlake (data center)) (from Redmond, Washington, US)
- Mitsubishi Electric (Mitsubishi Electric Automation, Inc.) (Vernon Hills) (from Tokyo, Japan)
- Mitutoyo (Aurora) (from Kawasaki, Japan)
- NEC (NEC Display Solutions) (Itasca) (from Tokyo, Japan)
- Nortel (Schaumburg) (from Mississauga, Canada)
- Northrop Grumman Electronic Systems (Rolling Meadows) (from Falls Church, Virginia, US)
- OMRON (Schaumburg, Bannockburn, St. Charles) (from Kyoto, Japan)
- Panasonic Factory Solutions Company of America (Rolling Meadows, Buffalo Grove) (from Osaka, Japan)
- PayPal (Chicago) (from San Jose, California)
- PC Connection (Itasca) (from Merrimack, New Hampshire)
- Salesforce.com (Chicago) (from San Francisco, California)
- SAP SE (Chicago, Downers Grove) (from Walldorf, Germany)
- STMicroelectronics (Schaumburg) (from Geneva, Switzerland)
- TopstepTrader
- Toshiba America (Arlington Heights, Buffalo Grove, Chicago, Rolling Meadows) (from Tokyo, Japan)
- Uber (Chicago) (from San Francisco, California, US)
- Yelp (Chicago) (from San Francisco, California, US)

=== Travel and transportation ===
- American Airlines (Hub at O'Hare International Airport) (from Fort Worth, Texas, US)
- APL Logistics (Oak Brook) (from Singapore)
- CSX Transportation (Northern Region Operations Center) (Calumet City) (from Jacksonville, Florida, US)
- Southwest Airlines (Hub at Chicago Midway International Airport) (from Dallas, Texas, US)
- UPS (Chicago Area Consolidation Hub) (Hodgkins) (from Sandy Springs, Georgia, US)

== See also ==
- List of Illinois companies
