= Lakeside Press =

Publishing imprint of R. R. Donnelley

Lakeside Press was a Chicago publishing imprint under which the RR Donnelley Company produced fine books as well as mail order catalogs, telephone directories, encyclopedias, and advertising. The Press was best known for its high quality editions for the Chicago Caxton Club as well as the Lakeside Classics, a series of fine reprints.

The printing plant, which was located along with company headquarters in the Lakeside Press Building on 22nd Street and Calumet Avenue, was closed in 1993, after which production moved to several other RRD plants.

== History ==
R.R. Donnelley & Sons Company was founded in Chicago in 1864 by Richard Robert Donnelley. Donnelley established a successful company in downtown Chicago, which in 1870 became the Lakeside Printing and Publishing Company (and later Donnelley, Loyd & Company). During the 1870s the company published the Lakeside Library book series. The business was destroyed in the Great Chicago Fire of 1871, leaving Donnelley to start his again with nothing but his reputation as capital. After a series of reorganizations and expansions, Donnelley built the Lakeside Press Building on Plymouth Court, and in 1902 began construction of the new Lakeside Press Building on 21st Street and Calumet Avenue. and became a global provider of printing and print-related services. From 1922-1945, the Director of Design and Typography was William A. Kittredge, who commissioned other well-regarded artists and designers, such as Rudolph Ruzicka, Edward A. Wilson, and W.A. Dwiggins.

The Donnelley company aimed to produce books and periodicals with modern design and mass printed commercial and reference materials. Lakeside Press produced Encyclopædia Britannica, Time Magazine, Life Magazine, promotional literature for the Model T Ford, catalogs for Sears Roebuck, among others. The Press produced high quality collectible editions for the Chicago Caxton Club and the Limited Editions Club. Donnelly was the official printer for the 1933-1934 World's Fair, "A Century of Progress," which took place on the Lake Michigan lakefront just to the east of the plant. The company designed and printed official tickets, postcards, posters, brochures, and magazines, distinctive of the company's modernist design.

== Lakeside Press Apprentice School and labor relations ==
In 1908 T.E. Donnelley, son of the founder, opened Lakeside Press Apprentice School. Donnelley, a Yale graduate and a trustee of the University of Chicago, felt that the recent revival of the ancient practice of apprenticeship was unsatisfactory because unions dominated the rules. He determined to open a program modeled on the apprentice training program at the Chaix Printing Company in Paris, France, which combined instruction and practical experience. "The whole plant," in the words of one official description, "is the laboratory of the school" The inscription for the 1913 handbook for apprentices stated that "The employer should realize that engaging an apprentice is a much more important task than hiring a journeyman." A 1933 pamphlet bragged that the apprentices "learn the ancient craft of printing on the finest of modern equipment" and "are imbued with the conviction that the better they do their work, the more they will earn and the higher they will rise.

The company was one of many which at the time offered apprenticeship courses of this type, ranging from the American Bridge Company and the American Locomotive Company to the Winchester Repeating Arms Company.

In the early years, most Donnelley employees did not belong to a union and some 90 percent of the company's executives and supervisors were graduates of the Apprentice Training School and were either college graduates who had gone through a training program or had come up through the ranks. The firm's turnover remained low. As Chicago became home to a northward migration of blacks, the workforce became stratified as non-whites found it hard to attain management positions. Racial tensions in the 1960s further weakened the company's ability to meet technological challenges and global competition. Declining fortunes led to layoffs and contention, and the plant closed in 1993.

== Lakeside Classics ==
Lakeside Classics is a series started in 1903 that reprints neglected classic works. According to company legend, Thomas E. Donnelley, then president of the company, was impressed by a set of seven razors presented to him by one of the company's suppliers, and wanted to create a gift that would similarly represent his own company's product and could not be purchased on the open market. The company did not sell the books to the public, but gave each of the company employees a copy at Christmas, making the series valued collector's items.

Thomas Donnelley wrote in the introduction to Autobiography of Benjamin Franklin, the first volume in the series, that "If, in a modest way this volume conveys the idea that machine-made books are not a crime against art, and that books may be plain but good, and good though not costly, its mission has been accomplished." Following volumes featured speeches and writings of noted Americans, then in the 1910s selections turned to first-person narratives of American history, especially those which were rare or out of print. Themes included the Civil War, the Old West, exploration and frontier life. In the 1990s, several changes were introduced. Partly to acknowledge the company's global markets, narratives by Americans abroad were included.

An early admirer wrote in 1923 that the printing, binding, and finishings were all done by the apprentice class to "illustrate the ideals of a well-made book," and that "not only are these books well made, but they contain historical works, autobiographies, and early travels unforgettable to him who loves this fair land." He concluded that the series is becoming "an institution near and dear to the collector of books of intrinsic value and beauty."

Minor design changes were made occasionally and a major redesign every quarter century. In 1995, the date line on the title page was changed from "Christmas" to "December." For the redesign in 2003, Bruce Campbell, known for his work on The Library of America, was engaged. Among other changes, the gold-framing on the cover was restored and the typeface was changed from Bulmer to Garamond

The company did not keep detailed records on how many copies were printed. The preface to the 1935 volume says that the print run for the first volume was 1,500 copies, but no further information was included in later editions. In the 1970s printings were in the tens of thousands. The hardest volume to find is the 1904 Inaugural Addresses of the Presidents, Washington to Lincoln. It is not known whether the run was smaller or whether collectors of Washington and Lincoln have kept them off the market by retaining them. The second scarcest is Fruits of Solitude, which may have been easy to lose because it had the fewest number of pages. The difficulty of finding the volume Memorable Speeches led one family member to joke that the speeches were so unmemorable that everyone threw them out. The Chicago publisher Reilly & Britton, a Chicago publisher, was given rights to reissue some of the earliest titles as "The Patriotic Classics."

By 2015, the series included 113 volumes.

== The Four American Books Campaign ==
Donnelley launched a "Four American Books" campaign in 1926 which culminated with their publication in 1930. The aim was to establish that the company's modern commercial machinery could produce illustrated books to rival high-quality presses in Europe and to establish a reputation as a printer of fine trade editions in order to enter the mass-market book industry. The choice of American authors reflected a growing pride in and market for American literature. C. G. Littell, vice president and treasurer, and William A. Kittredge, head of the department of design and typography, organized the campaign.

When Kittredge approached William Addison Dwiggins about illustrating a book for the project, Dwiggins, who was a well-established designer of magazine and newspaper advertisements, replied that he welcomed the chance to "do something besides waste-basket stuff" which would be "promptly thrown away." After he turned down several suggestions, Dwiggins agreed to illustrate the Tales of Edgar Allan Poe. The Press considered his fee of $2,000 low for an illustrator of his commercial power. Edward A. Wilson illustrated Richard Henry Dana's mid-19th century sea-adventure Two Years Before the Mast and Rudolph Ruzicka Henry David Thoreau's Walden.

The best known of the publications in the series was Rockwell Kent's edition of Herman Melville's novel, Moby-Dick, which at that point was not yet accepted as an American classic. Kittredge commissioned Kent to perform the design and illustrations in 1926, and the book appeared four years later in a three-volume limited edition of one-thousand copies issued in an aluminum slipcase. Kittredge called it "the greatest book done in this generation" and declared that "we will all go jump in the lake" if "it is not the greatest illustrated book ever done in America." (In fact, the book is considered one of the finest of the 20th century.) Random House quickly issued a one-volume trade edition, which was also printed by Lakeside Press, bound in black cloth die-stamped in silver. The book's cover and the first advertisements both featured Kent's name but did not mention Melville's. Kent's design, especially in the Modern Library edition of 1943, helped the novel to find a wider audience.

Kent's illustrations give the impression of being woodcuts but are in fact ink and wash. Kent counselled Kittredge that the "whole book is a work that should be read slowly, reflectively; the large page and type induce such reading. The character of the type should be homely, rather than refined and elegant, for homeliness flavors every line that Melville wrote." He wrote that he had thought of using a fourteen-point Caslon type-face, and he did make the pages rather large. The artist considered his illustrations "literary woodcutting, not engraving," and added that the illustrations show the "midnight darkness enveloping human existence, the darkness of the human soul, the abyss, -- such is the mood of Moby-Dick."

In 1992, the Library of Congress held an exhibition devoted to the Four American Classics series.

== Lakeside Press Galleries ==
in 1929, the company opened the Lakeside Galleries on the eight floor of their newly completed building on 22nd Street, near the shores of Lake Michigan. From 1930 to 1961, when corporate headquarters were moved, the galleries devoted exhibitions to the works of American and European artists and photographers, as well as to typography and book design.

== Publications ==
- Davis, Carl Dewitt (1922). A Study of the School for Apprentices of the Lakeside Press. R. R. Donnelley & sons Company.
- Official pictures of a Century of Progress exposition. Photographs by Kaufmann & Fabry co., official photographers (PDF). Chicago: Reuben H. Donnelley Corporation. 1933.
- Donnelley, R.R. and Sons Company (1915). Rules for Compositors. R.R. Donnelley & Sons Company.
- Lakeside Press (1913). The School for Apprentices of the Lakeside Press. R.R. Donnelley & Sons Company.
- The Lakeside Press (PDF). Chicago: R.R. Donnelley. 1933. Box 2 Folder 17
