= William A. Kittredge =

William A. Kittredge (1891 – July 26, 1945) was a Chicago designer and author on design.

== Biography ==
William A. Kittredge was born in 1891 in Lowell, Massachusetts to printer Albion Kittredge and was apprenticed to Thomas Parkhurst of the Parkhurst Press. After his apprenticeship, he worked at the Riverside Press in Cambridge, art director for a printing house in Philadelphia and various printing houses in New York and Boston as compositor, pressman, layout man, and art director.

Kittredge was Director of Design and Typography for Lakeside Press under R.R. Donnelley & Sons Co.'s of Chicago from 1922 to 1945, supervising all design services for the company. Under Kittredge's direction, Lakeside produced work for Chicago's Caxton Club and the Limited Editions Club. He also produced the "Four American Books" commissioning leading artists for cover designs including Rudolph Ruzicka for Walden, Edward A. Wilson for Two Years Before the Mast, W.A. Dwiggins, and Rockwell Kent for Moby Dick. These books were highly regarded for their printing craftsmanship. He further gained recognition for articles on the craft of printing in American Printer, Inland Printer, Publishers Weekly, and The Colophon.

He was an instructor at Northwestern University from 1927 to 1929 and 1931 to 1934. Kittredge was a founding member of the Society of Typographic Arts and the Chicago Art Directors Club. He was awarded the AIGA medal in 1939. Ruzicka wrote for News-Letter of his acceptance of the medal saying Kittredge's work was modern due to its "sparsely ornamented simplicity, dignified use of materials, [and] fitness to purpose."

Kittredge died July 26, 1945.
