= Public Communications Inc. =

- Industry: Marketing, Public Relations, Communications
- Founded: 1962
- Key people: Jill Allread (CEO); Craig Pugh (President)
- Website: pcipr.com

Public Communications Inc. (PCI) is a Chicago, Illinois-based communications agency specializing in crisis and issues management counsel, digital and social marketing services, and integrated communications for healthcare, conservation/environment, education, culture and destination marketing, civic and park district, and nonprofit organizations. Other services include senior counsel for brand and reputation management, executive/board strategic planning, media and presentation coaching; fundraising campaign communications; product launch and lifecycle promotions; awareness campaigns and events; websites, online platforms and collateral. PCI is a founding partner of Worldcom PR Group.

== History ==
Founded in 1962, PCI is consistently ranked by fee income among the largest independent (non-advertising agency owned) firms in the United States and Chicago. The agency is also among the largest certified Women’s Business Enterprise (WBE) public relations agencies in the United States.

In 2014, Jill Allread was named as CEO. Craig Pugh was named President in June 2015.
