= Vetsprevail =

Vets prevail

Vets Prevail, is a veteran-created online mental health program developed and supported by Prevail Health Solutions. It was created to combat the challenges faced by returning OEF and OIF veterans suffering from depression and post-traumatic stress disorder (PTSD). The program combines the principles of cognitive behavioral therapy (CBT) with interactive e-learning techniques to educate and provide veterans with tools to overcome mental health challenges faced upon returning home from deployment. Vets Prevail utilizes a variety of techniques including: interactive videos, live chats with trained Peer Coaches, and a peer network of veterans to motivate and help veterans readjust to life after returning home.

== Cognitive Behavioral Therapy (CBT) ==
The Vets Prevail intervention is based on the principles of cognitive behavioral therapy (CBT), a psychotherapeutic approach that aims to influence dysfunctional emotions, behaviors and cognitions through a goal-oriented, systematic procedure.

CBT takes a hands-on, practical approach to problem-solving. Its goal is to change the patterns of thinking or behavior that are behind people's difficulties, and so change the way they feel. It is used to treat a wide range of issues from sleeping difficulties to substance use disorders to anxiety and depression.

CBT is currently considered the standard of care for PTSD and depression by the Department of Veteran Affairs. Clinical trials have shown that CBT is as effective as pharmacological treatment for many emotional disorders, including PTSD and depression, with longer-lasting benefits.
