= Roundarch =

Digital business services company

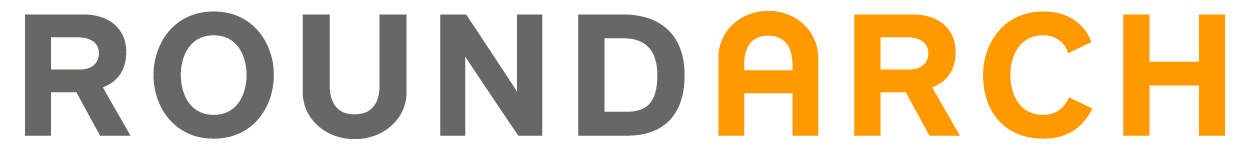
- Logo of Roundarch
- Type: Private
- Industry: Business Services
- Founded: 2000
- Headquarters: Chicago, Illinois, US (additional offices in New York, New York, Denver, Colorado, and Boston, Massachusetts)
- Key people: Jeff Maling (president & chief experience officer) Geoff Cubitt (president & CTO); Bruce Posner (senior VP & CFO) Jim Butler (senior VP of services)
- Products: Marketing & Web Design
- Number of employees: Approximately 250
- Website: www.roundarch.com

Roundarch was a privately held company that designed and implemented digital experiences and web content. In February 2012, Aegis Group LLC acquired the digital agency. After the acquisition, Roundarch merged with Isobar, Aegis Media's existing creative network, to form Roundarch Isobar. Roundarch delivered websites, rich web applications, mobile applications for the iPhone, iPad applications, Android (operating system) applications, social media applications and digital marketing campaigns for primarily Fortune 500 clients and large government organizations.

== History ==
Roundarch was founded in June 2000 by Deloitte and WPP. The company initially focused on building websites and applications. Roundarch had offices in Boston, Chicago, Denver and New York. Roundarch was a privately owned company, operated by its senior management until February 2012 when Aegis Group plc acquired the digital agency. After the acquisition, Roundarch merged with Isobar, Aegis Media's existing creative network, to form Roundarch Isobar.

== Projects ==
In 2010, Roundarch was contracted by the New York Jets to produce a touchscreen command center that provides real-time stadium and game data, which was operated by Woody Johnson.

Decision Maker In 2010, Bloomberg Sports partnered with Roundarch to design and develop the iPad and iPhone applications for its fantasy football tool Decision Maker. Front office In 2011, Bloomberg again partnered with Roundarch to create two iOS applications, including Front Office Draft Kit and focused on fantasy football and baseball.

In 2009, Roundarch announced the recreation of the online experience for Avis Rent-a-Car, redesigning their website and creating an iOS application for the service. A site extension for the service was also made.

In 2010, ClubCorp, owner of multiple private golf clubs, contracted Roundarch to redesign various websites, including those of ClubCorp's affiliate clubs.

In 2010, Crowley Maritime Corporation contracted Roundarch to produce a website for them. Roundarch and Crowley Maritime Corporation were awarded a 2011 TMSA Compass Award.

In 2009, Roundarch worked in partnership with Herff Jones and Nystrom to develop StrataLogica, a 3D map and globe viewer application.

In April 2009, Roundarch announced its participation in designing the Tesla Model S prototype sedan's touch-screen control panel.
