= R.R. Donnelley and Sons Co. Calumet Plant =

- U.S. National Register of Historic Places
- Chicago Landmark
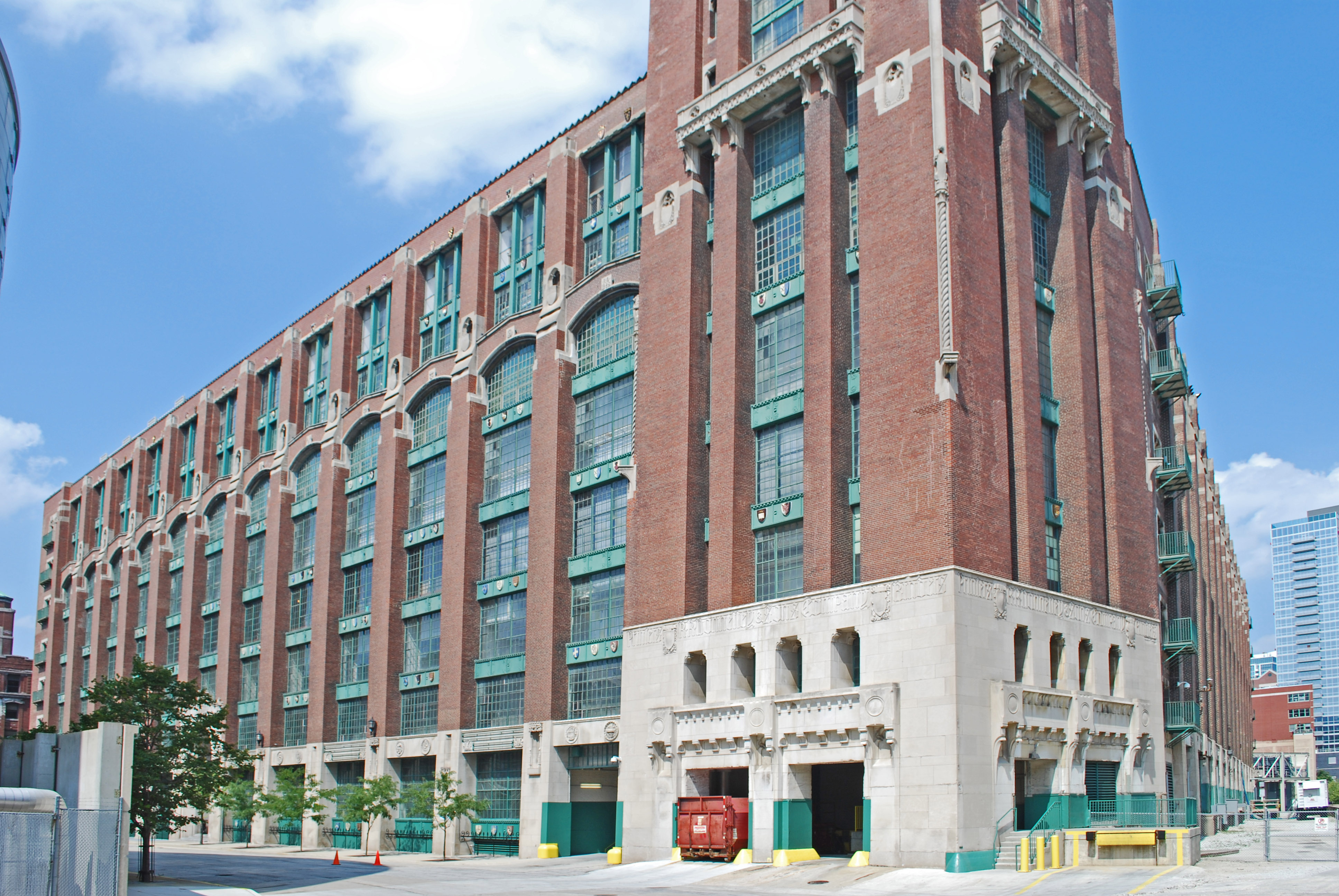

- Location within Chicago metropolitan area Location within Illinois Location within the United States
- Location: 350 E Cermak Road Chicago, Illinois
- Coordinates: 41°51′13″N 87°37′5″W
- Built: 1912 to 1929
- Architect: Howard Van Doren Shaw, Charles Zeller Klauder
- Architectural style: English Gothic
- NRHP reference No.: 83000308

Significant dates
- Added to NRHP: February 17, 1983
- Designated CHICL: March 31, 2004

The R.R Donnelley Printing Plant, sometimes known as the Calumet Plant or the Lakeside Plant and now known as the Lakeside Technology Center, was built between 1912 and 1929 to house the operations of the RR Donnelley printing company. In 1993, the plant was closed after the discontinuation by Sears, Roebuck and Co. of its mail-order catalog, which had been the last major account printed there. In 1999 the building was retrofitted and is currently owned by Digital Realty Trust operating as a carrier hotel and data center. The newly outfitted building was the first and largest planned carrier hotel in the United States.

The building was designed by Howard Van Doren Shaw to be a fireproof design of poured reinforced concrete columns and an open-shell concrete floor. Although considered to be expensive by the standards of that time, T.E. Donnelley agreed that the support would be needed for the many tons of paper they used and large presses they operated. Supported by 4,675 steel-reinforced concrete columns, this type of construction not only served the Donnelley well, it also provided the perfect infrastructure for future tenants. To further the building's support structure, reinforcing bars, normally laid perpendicular, were laid at various angles enabling the floors to bear loads of at least 250 pounds per square foot.

Current major tenants of the building include the Chicago Mercantile Exchange, Telx, Equinix, Steadfast Networks and CenturyLink.

Exterior ornaments depict symbols of printing history. Portions of the building, including the interior Memorial Library, were designed by architect Charles Klauder.

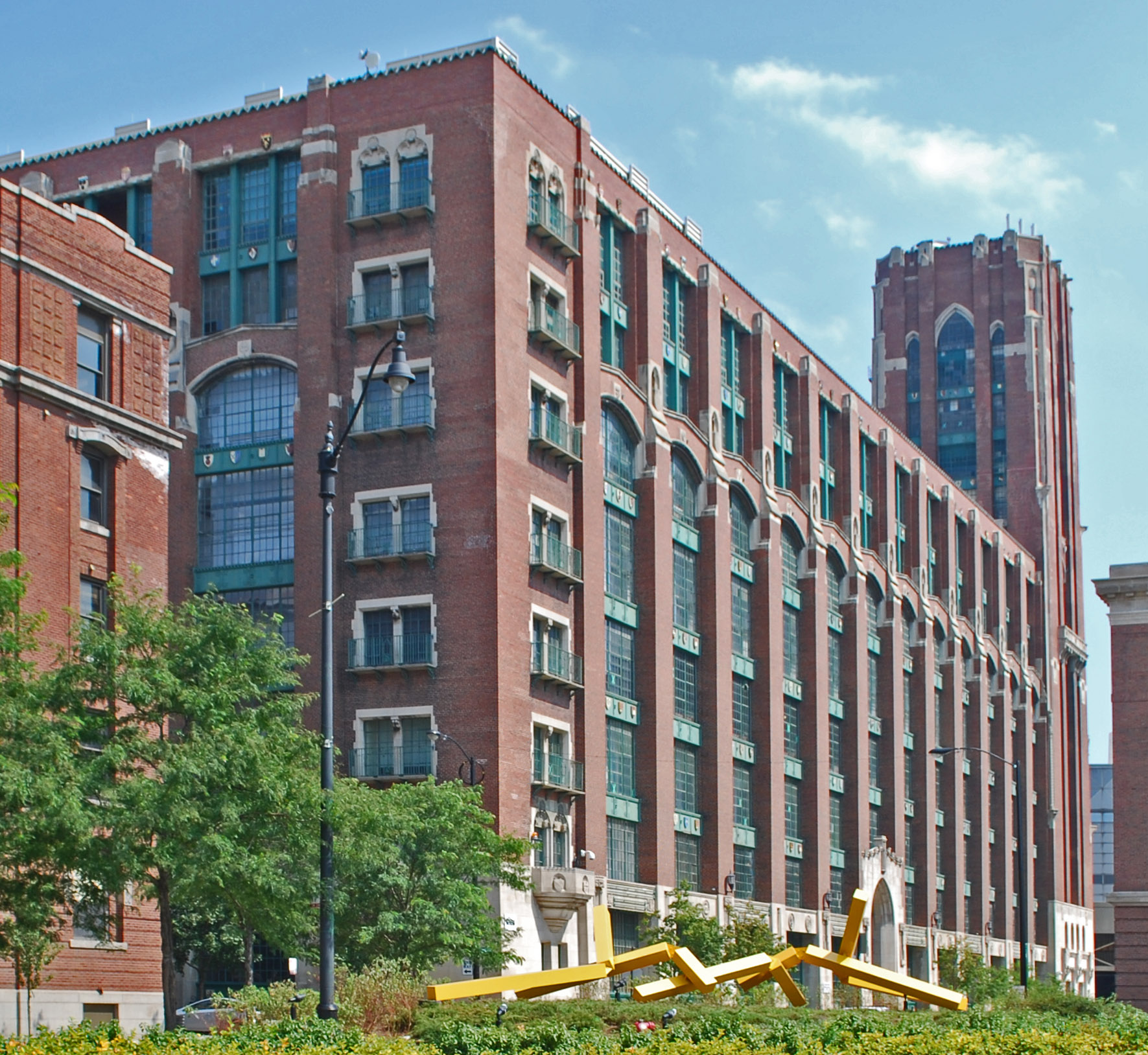
View from west

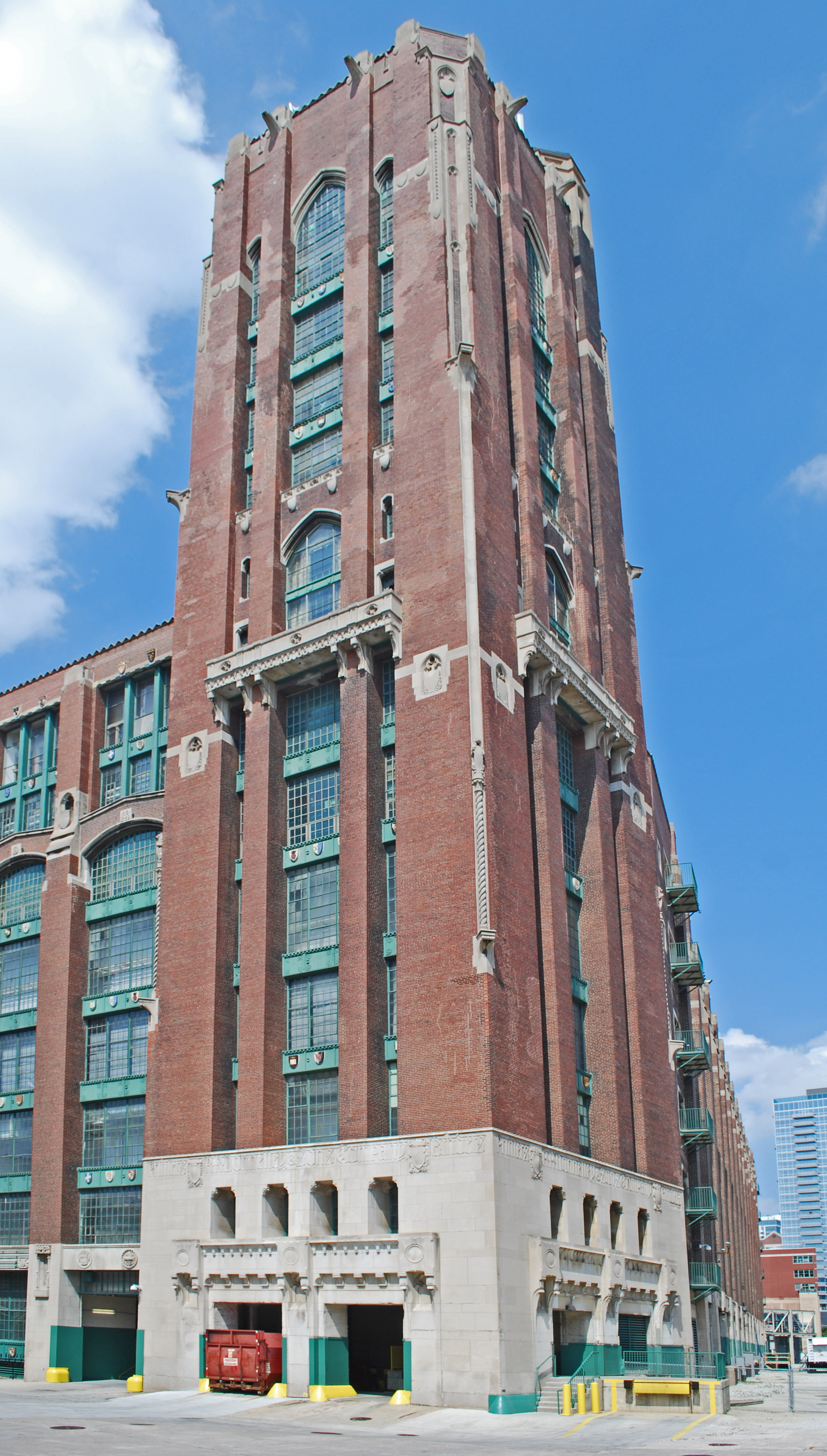
Corner tower

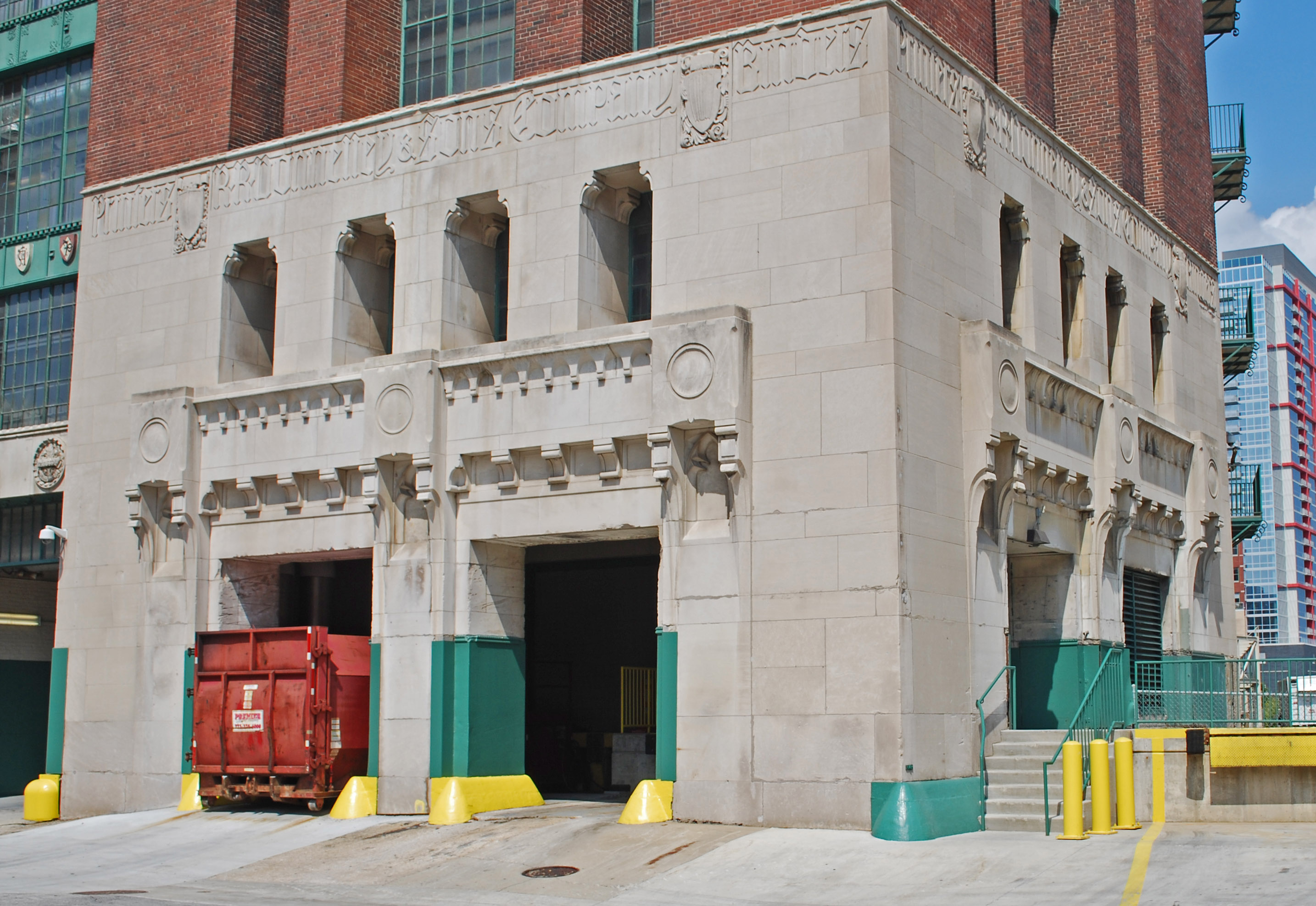
Base of tower

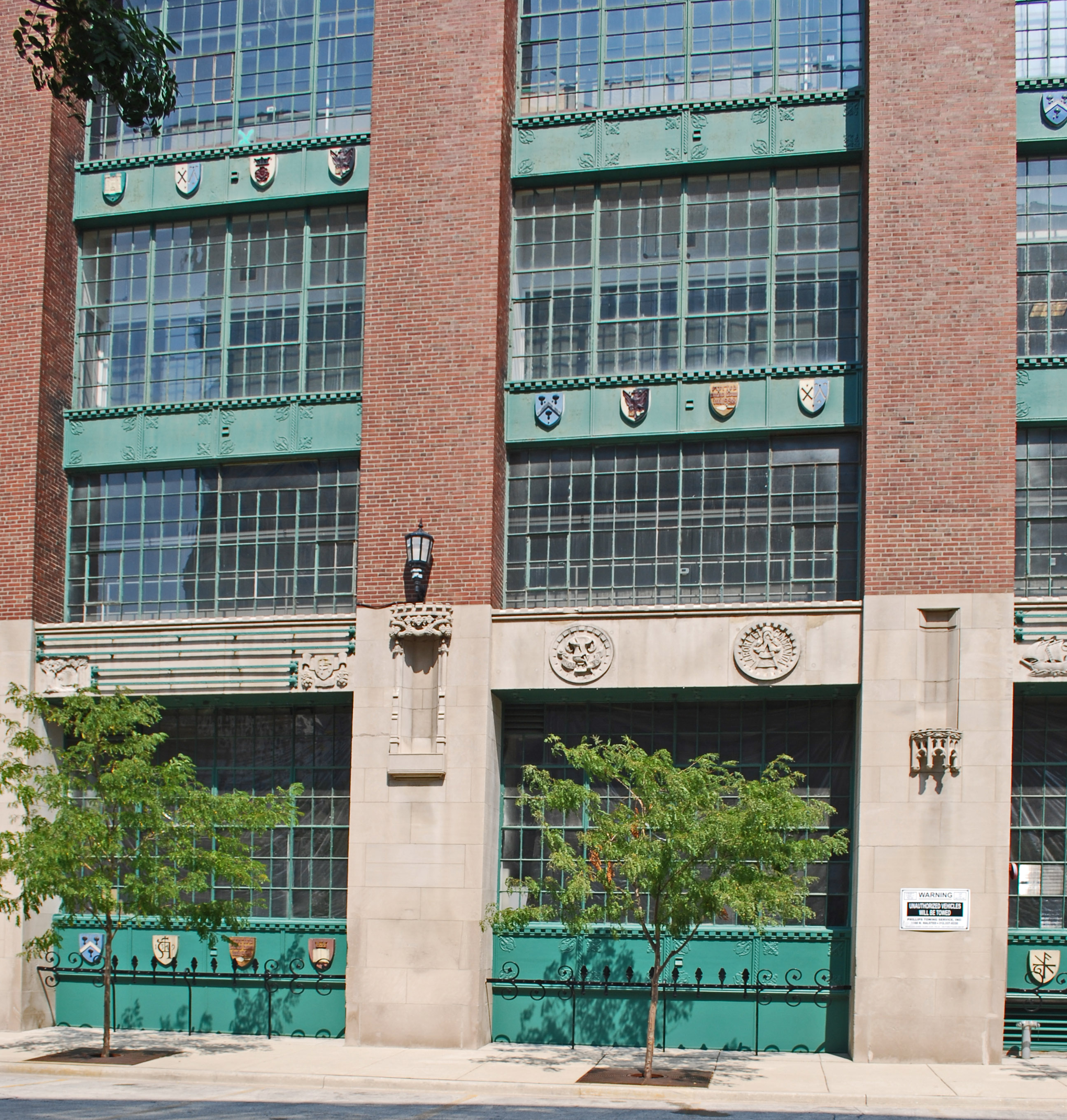
Detail of piers

== See also ==
- Lakeside Press Building
