= Lakeside Press Building =

- U.S. National Register of Historic Places
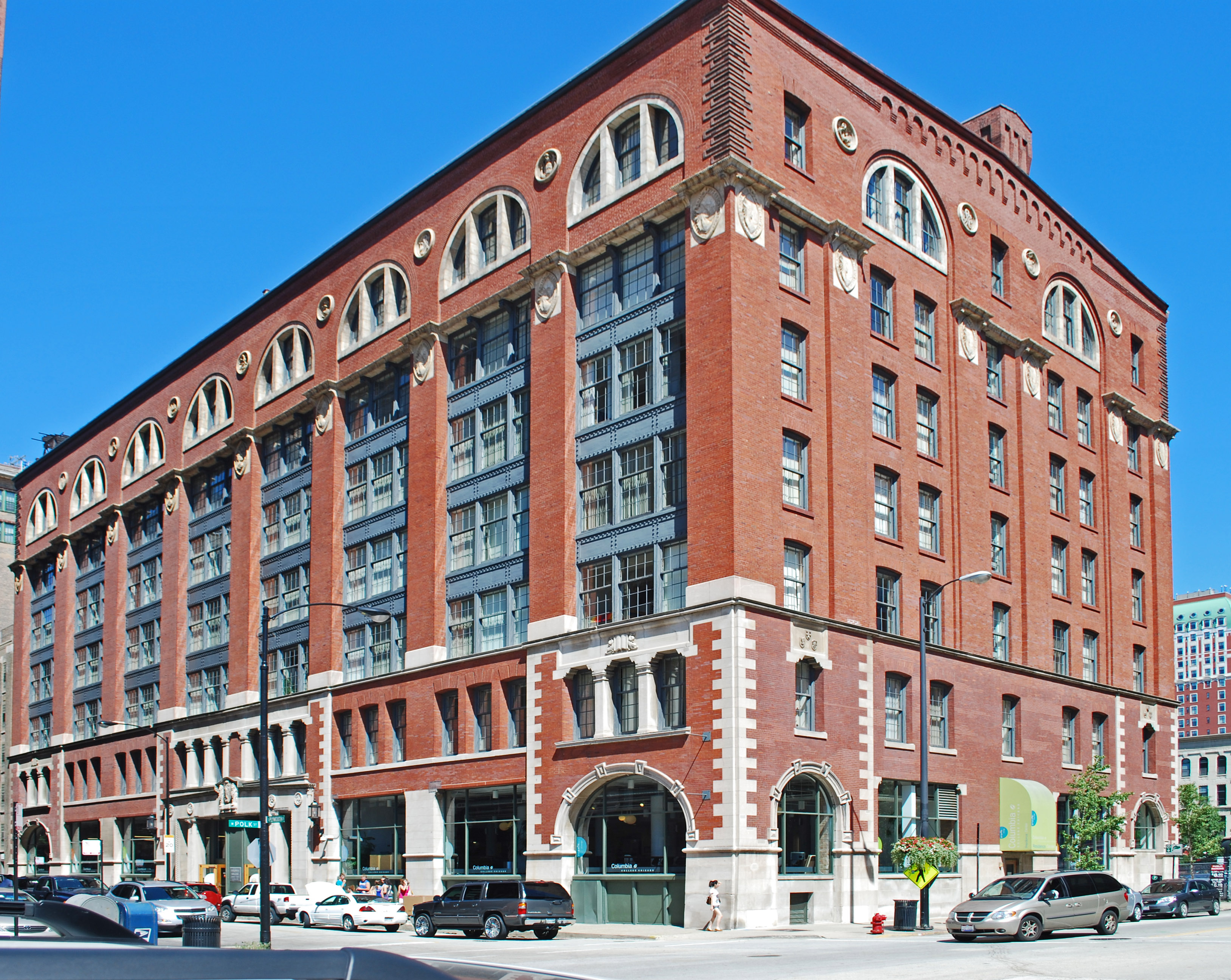

- Location within Chicago metropolitan area Location within Illinois Location within the United States
- Location: 731 S. Plymouth Ct., Chicago, Illinois
- Coordinates: 41°52′21″N 87°37′42″W
- Area: 1 acre (0.40 ha)
- Built: 1897, 1901
- Architect: Shaw, Howard Van Doren
- Architectural style: Chicago
- NRHP reference No.: 76000694
- Added to NRHP: June 23, 1976

The Lakeside Press Building is a historic commercial building located at 731 S. Plymouth Ct. in downtown Chicago, Illinois. The building served as a showroom, office, and printing press for the Lakeside Press. The building was built in two stages; the southern half was completed in 1897, while the northern half was finished in 1901. Architect Howard Van Doren Shaw designed the building, his first design of a commercial building. Shaw's design features limestone quoins, piers, and decorations, curtain walls with cast iron spandrels on the floors housing the printing presses, and a projecting cornice.

The building was added to the National Register of Historic Places on June 23, 1976.

In 1985 the building was converted to residential use, and was purchased by Columbia College Chicago in 1993 as its first residence hall. Columbia sold the building in 2017 for $20 million, and continued leasing it through the 2018–19 academic year.

== See also ==
- R.R. Donnelley and Sons Co. Calumet Plant
