= SpotHero =

American digital parking marketplace company

SpotHero by Uber
- Type: Private
- Industry: Parking
- Founded: 2011; 15 years ago
- Founder: Mark Lawrence; Larry Kiss; Jeremy Smith
- Headquarters: Chicago, Illinois, U.S.
- Area served: North America
- Key people: Mark Lawrence (CEO); Chris Stevens (CMO); Beth Hayden (CPO); Matt DiBari (CPO); Matt Sullivan (CRO)
- Services: Parking reservations
- Number of employees: 219 (July 2018)
- Subsidiaries: Parking Panda
- Website: spothero.com

SpotHero is an American company which operates an online marketplace for drivers looking to reserve and pay for parking spaces with parking lots, parking garages and valet services. The marketplace is available in over 300 cities in the United States and Canada. The company is based in Chicago, Illinois. The platform is available via apps and the company's website.

In February 2026 it was announced that SpotHero would be acquired by Uber, with the closing expected to take place later in the year.

== History ==
=== Early beginnings ===
SpotHero was founded by Mark Lawrence and Jeremy Smith in Chicago in 2011, with co-founder Larry Kiss joining the company soon after. The company started out as a peer-to-peer parking marketplace, where people could rent out their own private parking spots, before expanding the platform to partner with parking companies and garages.

In December 2012, SpotHero raised $2.5 million in venture capital funds from Battery Ventures (lead), 500 Startups, Bullet Time, e.Ventures, OCA Ventures, New World Ventures, Lightbank, and Draper Associates; at the time, it only served Milwaukee and Chicago. In June 2014, SpotHero raised an additional $4.5 million in funding and announced new board of directors members, including LinkedIn's Mike Gamson, Match.com's Sam Yagan, and venture capitalist Sam Guren. The company raised $20 million in Series B funding in 2015, and an additional $30 million in a Series C round in July 2017. In September 2018, the company raised an additional $10 million, bringing its total raised since launching to $68 million. In August 2019 SpotHero announced $50 million in Series D funding led by Macquarie Capital, bringing the company's total funding to date to $118 million.

=== Growth and expansion ===
Between 2011 and 2013, the company expanded from 5 employees to 22, grew to seven business markets (Chicago, New York, Washington, D.C., Boston, Baltimore, Newark, and Milwaukee) and opened an office in New York City. By August 2015, SpotHero serviced 5 additional cities: Denver, Minneapolis, New Orleans, Philadelphia, and San Francisco. In July 2016, the company expanded to Los Angeles, and in January 2017 added 13 additional cities, including Austin, Indianapolis, Miami and San Diego. As of November 2020, the company operates in over 400 cities in North America with a network of over 11,000 facilities.

SpotHero for Business was launched in March 2017, as a business-focused service with tools for paying, managing and organizing parking expenses. The company also launched a developer platform to allow businesses to integrate parking reservations into their existing apps. In May 2017, SpotHero announced a partnership with commuter employee benefits administrator WageWorks allowing users to pay pre-tax dollars for daily parking near their places of work.

In 2018, SpotHero was named to Time magazine's inaugural list of 50 Genius Companies that are inventing the future.

In March 2019, SpotHero partnered with transit app Moovit to offer drivers the chance to view and book off-street parking near transit stations in San Francisco. In June 2019, it was reported that SpotHero was partnering with Waze, a GPS navigation software app owned by Google, to link their navigation and parking into a unified user experience.

In 2023, the company launched Flex Rates, a customizable dynamic pricing product allowing operators of parking garages or lots to adjust prices based on real-time data.

=== Sale to Uber ===
On February 23, 2026, it was announced that SpotHero would be acquired by Uber. Terms of the sale were not disclosed, with the sale expected to close later in the year. In announcing the acquisition, Uber announced that it would offer a "parking reservation experience" powered by SpotHero that would allow Uber users to find parking spaces for places such as airports and venues using the Uber app.

== Acquisitions ==
SpotHero acquired San Francisco-based peer-to-peer parking marketplace ParkPlease in April 2015.

In April 2017, SpotHero acquired Parking Panda, a Baltimore-based services and event parking company. The acquisition expanded SpotHero into Canada, and brought the number of parking locations the company could reserve at to over 5,000.

In November 2020, SpotHero acquired the Toronto-based app Rover Parking.

== See also ==
- ParkWhiz
- Parking Panda
