= Parker House Sausage Company =

- Parker House Sausage Company
- Type: Private
- Industry: Food
- Founded: 1919
- Headquarters: Chicago, Illinois, U.S.
- Key people: Judge H. Parker
- Products: Deli meat, sausage
- Website: parkerhousesausage.com/

Parker House Sausage Company, founded in 1919, is one of the oldest black-owned businesses in the United States. Since 1926, the company has been located in the same building at 4605 S. State Street in Chicago's Bronzeville neighborhood.

In 1962, the company was noted as the nation's largest black-owned company.

== History ==
The company was started by Chicago entrepreneur Judge H. Parker. His mother allowed him $10 from the sugar bowl, which bought him 50lbs of pork trimmings to start the process in his kitchen. Throughout its history, it has remained a family-owned business. Parker House sausage is known primarily as a Chicago-Midwest and southern cultural phenomenon; however, initially it received national distribution and recognition. In the 1930s, sales manager M. E. Woodson focused on expanding the brand throughout the United States, and in 1939, during a speech in Washington DC, he noted that total sales had doubled in the prior year.

In 1978, company president Daryl Grisham was awarded twice by the Small Business Administration.

After expanding their product line for many years, the company began discontinuing certain items and now focuses primarily on niche markets, with Polish sausage, smoked sausage, hot links and head cheese, among others.
