= Souldier (company) =

Company

Souldier is a company founded in Chicago, Illinois, primarily known for its hand-made guitar straps.

In 2004, Jen Tabor, music teacher and band-member, made guitar straps as birthday presents for the other band-members, using fabric and recycled seatbelts. This idea turned into a business. She started selling the straps at gigs, then contacted local music stores, who started selling them. She says that "I would just walk into a store and have a bucket of straps and ask people to buy them, and once they saw them they said, 'Yes.'" Tabor sold straps at Lollapalooza. A break came when Jeff Tweedy in the band Wilco used a strap he had bought in a Chicago music store on a 2008 episode of Saturday Night Live. Tabor says she got calls about the strap the next day. The business grew, and Tabor stopped teaching by 2010. As of 2017, the company had c. 5 employees. In 2022, the company purchased the Leader Publications building in Niles, Michigan, making it the new headquarter.

Souldier's straps are hand-made, using used seatbelts, vintage fabric and leather. The company also produce straps for other string-instruments, belts, dog-collars and, as of 2020, protective face masks.

Apart from Wilco, Souldier straps have been used by bands like Aerosmith, The Black Keys and The Lumineers. Guitar makers like Reverend Guitars have released guitars with custom designed Souldier straps.
