= Prevail Health Solutions =

- Company type: Private
- Industry: Digital mental health
- Founded: 2008
- Founders: Richard Gengler; Roger Sweis
- Headquarters: Chicago, Illinois, United States
- Website: prevailhealth.com

Prevail Health Solutions is a Chicago-based healthcare technology company that created a system for online delivery of evidence-based mental health care. The company aims to create greater access to cost-effective therapy for those who have difficulty seeking and receiving adequate treatment.

Prevail was founded in January 2008 by Richard Gengler, then an MBA student at the University of Chicago. It was born out of the need to provide effective and accessible mental health care to the growing number of veterans returning from Iraq and Afghanistan. Gengler, a former US Navy pilot, leveraged his background to create a unique delivery model to bring mental health treatment to returning troops.

Prevail has received grants from the National Science Foundation’s Small Business Innovation Research Program. Additionally, the McCormick Foundation has supported this effort to help returning veterans through a grant to the Veterans' Corporation. Prevail was also awarded a contract through the Veterans Health Administration to deliver mental health care through its online platform.

== Programs ==
Vets Prevail

An online CBT-based program designed to support veterans returning from service, combining interactive lessons with moderated peer coaching and community features.

iPrevail

A consumer-facing app providing self-guided lessons, assessments and on-demand peer coaching; it has been deployed county-wide in Los Angeles since 2021 through the Department of Mental Health.
