= PrepMe =

American online tutoring company

PrepMe LLC
- Type: Test preparation, Adaptive learning
- Industry: Internet, Education
- Founded: 2001
- Founder: Karan Goel (CEO); Avichal Garg (CTO); Joe Jewell (VP)
- Headquarters: Chicago, Illinois, USA
- Website: PrepMe.com

PrepMe is an American education technology company founded in 2001. It offers online courses and tutoring for standardized achievement tests, in particular the PSAT, SAT, and ACT.

== History ==
The company was founded by Avichal Garg, Karan Goel, and Joe Jewell, in 2001. In 2011, the company developed its Coursification platform for publishing tests and online courses.

In 2008, PrepMe was recognized at the Chicago Innovation Awards and was featured on the front cover of Fortune Small Business.

In July 2011, PrepMe was acquired by Ascend Learning.
