= Someoddpilot =

Independent record label

SomeOddPilot
- Founded: 1999
- Country of origin: U.S.
- Location: Chicago, Illinois
- Official website: someoddpilot.com

Someoddpilot is primarily a visual communication agency and Someoddpilot Records is an independent record label that exists within the larger visual communication agency. They are located in the Wicker Park neighborhood of Chicago, and owned by Chris Eichenseer.

As an agency, they work with web design, web development, branding, art direction, photography, print design, packaging design, animation, information architecture and video. Many of their clients are involved in the independent music scene, including the Chicago-based online music criticism publication Pitchfork Media and music labels Drag City Records, Jagjaguwar, and Secretly Canadian, though they have also worked with clients such as Coca-Cola, Sony and Caterpillar. As a record label they have signed artists such as The TImeout Drawer and La Makia Soma.

== History ==
Chris Eichenseer founded Someoddpilot in 1999, three years after graduating from the University of Illinois Urbana-Champaign with a BFA in photography. It was during his time at the University of Illinois that he met fellow artist Andy Mueller, who graduated in 1993 with a degree in Media Studies. Upon graduation, Mueller formed OhioGirl, his freelance design company. In 1994 they both moved to Chicago, where they met Justin Fines, the owner of Demo Design. Mueller moved to Los Angeles, California in 1999, and Eichenseer formed Someoddpilot in Chicago and formed a working partnership with Justin Fines and his company Demo Design.

== Clients and work ==
Someoddpilot has produced work for a wide range of clients. They designed the identity, branding and website for Pitchfork Media, "one of the more important indie music tastemakers in any medium." In August 2009 Someoddpilot redesigned the website for Drag City Records, an independent rock label who has signed such bands as Loose Fur, Stereolab, Joanna Newsom, and Bonnie "Prince" Billy. They have designed album artwork for a variety of artists and musicians, including Blondfire, Caural, The Timeout Drawer, Consumers and Optimus.

== Shows ==
In July 2009, Someoddpilot sponsored This Public Works, a gallery show by artists Chris Eichenseer, Justin Fines, Andy Mueller and Cody Hudson at the Andrew Rafacz Gallery in Chicago. The show focused on the influence of the independent music and art communities on their work. The pieces in the show were, "wholly representative of the dual-influences of fine and commercial art in the artists' lives, the gallery covered in an egalitarian display of screenprints, a digital pastiche of color blocks, Greco-Roman statues, sardonic portrait photography and Dungeons and Dragons references." The show included a series of lectures by artists, including Jay Ryan, the famous poster artist from The Bird Machine, Chris Kaskie, the Publisher of Pitchfork Media, and Dawn Hancock, the owner of Firebelly Design in Chicago. Speakers shared experiences in making low-profit, public work.

== Someoddpilot Records ==
Chris Eichenseer began Someoddpilot Records with Jason Goldberg in 1999 when he established Someoddpilot as a visual communication agency. They focus on providing electronic, ambient, experimental post-rock and obscure music forms. As of 2002, they have 15 releases.

== Roster ==
- The TImeout Drawer
- Salvo Beta
- La Makia Soma
- Molar Mill
- K-Rad
- Defender
- DJ Dumb American
- Beak

== Other sources ==
- http://chicago.timeout.com/articles/art-design/77523/public-works-at-andrew-rafacz-gallery
- http://www.thequietlife.com/
- http://www.ohiogirl.com/
- https://web.archive.org/web/20091214183641/http://www.chriseichenseer.com/about.html
- https://web.archive.org/web/20110724230950/http://www.aigachicago.org/node/13961
- http://the217.com/articles/view/uiuc_alums_a_part_of_chicago_art_show
