= Colonial Ice Cream =

Illinois, United States, company

Colonial Ice Cream is a brand of ice cream manufactured by Colonial Ice Cream, Inc, of St. Charles, Illinois.

Colonial is a descendant of a dairy business founded in 1901 by Simon Anderson of St. Charles.
