= Orderzone.com =

OrderZone.com was an online business-to-business website for business products and services, allowing companies to purchase from multiple suppliers and processing transactions on the site. It was online from 1999 to 2001.

== History ==
OrderZone.com was launched in 1999 by the maintenance, repair, and operations (MRO) company W. W. Grainger (NYSE:GWW), with participating supplier companies at this time being Grainger Industrial Supply, Cintas, Corporate Express, Inc., Lab Safety Supply, Marshall Industries, VWR International, Fastenal, and Motion Industries. Each supplier covered a different product area, and by 2000 the site had more than 420,000 products in its database and was ranked as the #3 B2B website by Advertising Age's Business Marketing. W. W. Grainger's initial budget for the site was US$10 million.

W. W. Grainger's e-commerce strategy at this time aimed to create a digital business group that expanded their catalog (reaching more than 4,000 pages in length) and allow buyers and sellers to buy and sell over the internet. Orderzone also allowed more prices to be listed, something that was not always possible in the print catalog. At this time W. W. Grainger also released FindMRO.com, which specialized in sourcing hard to find products. There were also a number of other sites at this time trying to create online marketplaces for the MRO industry, including EqualFooting.com, iProcure, MarketSite, MRO.com, OnlineMRO.com, ProcureNet, PurchasingCenter.com and TPN Register.

OrderZone.com did not generate as many paying customers as W. W. Grainger originally estimated, and in 2000 the company was merged with Works.com, an office and technology products e-commerce business based in Austin, Texas, as part of a deal where 40% of Works.com was sold to W. W. Grainger for US$21 million. OrderZone.com was then closed in 2001.
