= Rival (software company) =

SilkRoad Technology, Inc.
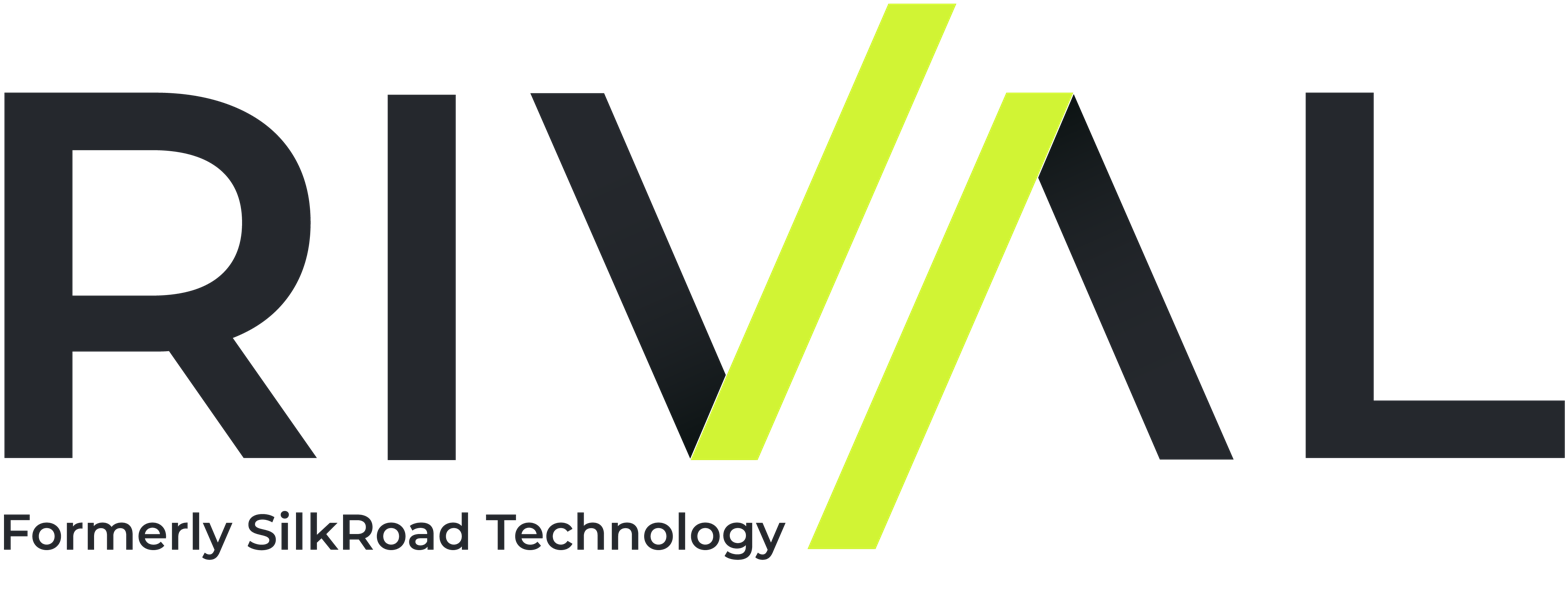
- Trade name: Rival
- Type: Corporation
- Industry: Software company
- Founded: 2003 (in Winston-Salem, North Carolina, US)
- Founder: Andrew Filipowski; Brian Platz
- Headquarters: Chicago, Illinois, USA
- Area served: Worldwide
- Key people: Greg DiTullio: CEO; Tom Higgins; Chief Revenue Officer; Steven Gross; Chief Financial Officer; Poornima Farrar; Chief Product Officer; Ron Teeter; Chief Technology Officer; John Collins; VP, Strategy & Operations
- Products: Recruit (OpenHire); Engage (Sourcing, Candidate Engagement, Hosted Apply); Onboard (RedCarpet); Learn (GreenLight); Perform (WingSpan); HeartBeat; Point; LifeSuite
- Revenue: ▲US$
- Number of employees: 140
- Website: rival-hr.com

SilkRoad Technology, Inc., doing business as Rival, is a software company for human resources management. Rival is headquartered in Chicago, Illinois. The company has mid-market to Fortune 100 clients, including AirBnB, Cleveland Clinic, Dairy Queen, eBay, Netflix and Stellantis.

== History ==
SilkRoad Technology, Inc. was founded in North Carolina in 2003 by Andrew "Flip" Filipowski with Eprise, and launched at the Human Resource Executive Technology Conference and Expo in Chicago in 2005.

SilkRoad Technology acquired OpenHire, based in Winston-Salem in 2004.

SilkRoad Technology acquired VTN Technologies, Inc., the creator of Olé Online Learning Environment training software, in 2008.

The company headquarters relocated to Chicago in 2010.

In 2019 SilkRoad Technology began providing Strategic Consulting Services.

In 2021, SilkRoad Technology was acquired by HighBar Partners.

In 2022, SilkRoad Technology purchased the assets of Entelo, adding market-established candidate search, candidate marketing, candidate interviewing and search/marketing outsourcing capabilities.

In 2023, SilkRoad Technology rebranded to Rival and re-launched its legacy recruiting solution, Rival Recruit, the first complete Talent Acquisition suite with more than 700M pre-loaded passive candidates powered by AI-driven insights and candidate engagement.

== Locations ==
SilkRoad Technology operates in facilities in Edmonton, Alberta, Canada; Philippines; and Belgrade, Serbia.

== Products ==
Name	Description
Recruit (OpenHire)	Candidate Identification Software/Solutions, Recruiting Management and Applicant Tracking System
Engage	AI-enabled sourcing, recruitment marketing, career sites, hosted apply and integrations with applicant tracking systems
Workflow (RedCarpet)	Onboarding and Life Events
Learn (GreenLight)	Learning Management
Perform (WingSpan)	Performance Management
