= Roundarch Isobar =

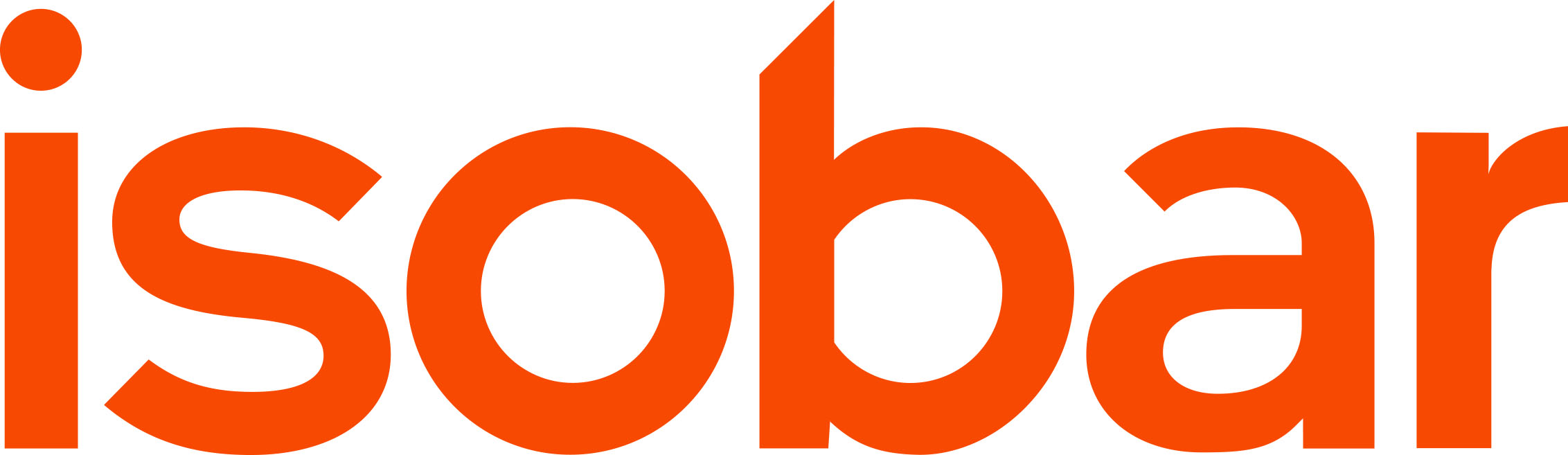
- Company type: Public
- Industry: Marketing, Technology and Business Services
- Number of locations: Chicago, Illinois, New York, New York, Denver, Colorado, Detroit, Michigan, and Boston, Massachusetts
- Key people: Jeff Maling; (Co-CEO); Geoff Cubitt; (Co-CEO); Jim Butler; (President); Bruce Posner; (Chief Financial Officer)
- Products: Marketing & Web Design
- Number of employees: Approximately 450
- Parent: Dentsu International
- Website: isobar.com (company website)

Isobar, known as Roundarch Isobar until 2013, is a digital marketing agency. It was formed after the 2012 merger of Roundarch and Isobar U.S., following the acquisition of Roundarch by Dentsu Aegis Network in a $125 million deal. Isobar describes itself as a digital agency that "creates applications and digitally-centered marketing campaigns for the web, mobile devices, and social media."

== Sample projects ==
Isobar's client list includes 2000 global entities and large government organizations. These clients represent several industries including media, energy, financial services, healthcare, manufacturing, food and beverage, retail, transportation, sports, and hospitality.

Major clients include the HBO, Coca-Cola, adidas, JBL, U.S. Air Force, Avis, Cinemax, Healthways, Bloomberg Sports, Yahoo!, KCRW, New York Jets, Air National Guard, Boston Celtics, and the Next Restaurant.

=== HBO ===
Isobar developed HBO.com. The website's new expanded features include: streaming video, a community space, and a personal dashboard.

=== Avis Budget Group ===
In 2009, Roundarch (Isobar) announced the recreation of the online experience for Avis Rent-a-Car. Roundarch also created an e-commerce widget called a "Site Extension" that expands AVIS’ online presence by embedding the Avis rental booking function on a partner's Web site all on a single page.

=== Adidas miCoach ===
In 2012, Isobar helped Adidas build the miCoach system. This tracking technology uses a small data chip embedded in each player's uniform, to provide detailed information about that player's athleticism. Heart rate, stress levels and speed are just a few of the indicators tracked with the miCoach system.

=== United States Air Force ===
Since 2001, Roundarch (Isobar) worked with the United States Air Force on various projects includes building and maintaining their enterprise portal. In 2010, the Air Force Portal was updated with new Web 2.0 features.

=== Healthways ===
In 2011, Healthways entered into a 5-year strategic agreement with Roundarch (Isobar) and introduced new online and mobile capabilities in their EmbraceTM 5.0 platform.
