= Transco Railway Products =

American railway products and services company

Transco Inc.
- Company type: Subsidiary
- Industry: Rail transport, Manufacturing
- Founded: October 1936; 89 years ago
- Headquarters: Chicago, Illinois, United States
- Area served: United States
- Products: Railcar repair and maintenance; Thermal insulation products; Railway equipment
- Parent: Marmon Rail (2019–present); Berkshire Hathaway
- Subsidiaries: Transco Railway Products Inc.; Transco Products Inc.; Advance Thermal Corp.

Transco Inc. is an American holding company for a group of corporations that provide products and services to the railroad industry. Established in October 1936, the company has operated in the rail transportation sector for nearly nine decades. Since 2019, Transco has been owned by Marmon Rail, a subsidiary of Berkshire Hathaway.

== History ==
Transco was founded in October 1936, originally focused on servicing the North American railroad industry.

In 1984, the company was restructured as Transco Inc. to serve as a parent entity for several subsidiaries, each concentrating on specialized areas of railcar maintenance, manufacturing, and thermal technologies.

== Subsidiaries ==
- Transco Railway Products Inc. – Corporate headquarters in Chicago, Illinois, with seven manufacturing facilities located along major rail transportation corridors in the United States.
- Transco Products Inc. – Provider of heat-resistant and thermal insulation products for the rail and industrial sectors.
- Advance Thermal Corp. – Specializes in advanced thermal protection solutions.

== Operations ==
Transco Railway Products operates facilities strategically located in rail hubs, focusing on:

- Freight railcar repair, maintenance, and conversion
- Supply of new and refurbished railcar components
- Design and application of thermal insulation systems for industrial use

The company’s operations have supported the growth of freight rail infrastructure in North America by maintaining rolling stock and providing replacement parts for rail operators.

== Acquisition by Marmon Rail ==
In 2019, Transco was acquired by Marmon Rail, a business unit of Marmon Group, which itself is part of Berkshire Hathaway. The acquisition integrated Transco’s railcar service network into Marmon’s broader railcar leasing and services portfolio.

== See also ==
- Rail transport in the United States
- Marmon Group

== Company Website ==
- Transco Railway Products Inc.

== External media coverage ==
- Logansport's Transco Railway Products and union reach tentative agreement
- Johnstown America begins coal-car deliveries for FirstEnergy
