= Translate.com =

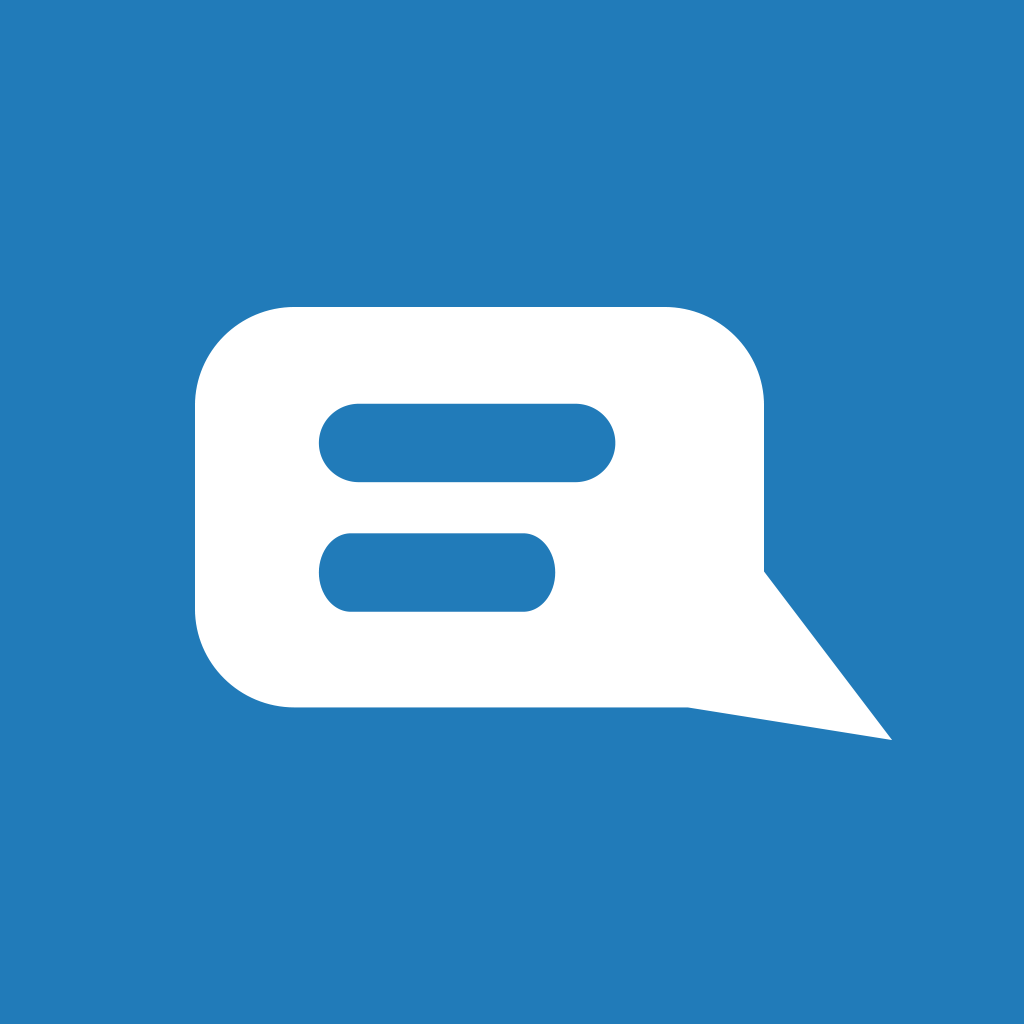
- Industry: Language translation
- Founded: 2011
- Founder: Emerge Media
- Headquarters: Chicago, United States
- Key people: Anthos Chrysanthou (CEO)
- Website: www.translate.com

Translate.com is a human-powered translation service based in Chicago, Illinois. The company offers a web-based human translation subscription platform in combination with artificial intelligence technologies.

== History ==
Translate.com was launched in 2011 by Emerge Media; a media and Internet company founded by Anthos Chrysanthou. Chrysanthou is the current CEO of Translate.com. In 2015, Translate.com launched its enterprise platform which brings together artificial intelligence, human translators and editors to offer scalable translation services.

== Products and services ==
Translate.com offers translation in 96 languages through a web-based translation platform using human translators and artificial intelligence technologies. Translate.com has launched its apps for iOS and Android.

== Controversy ==
In September 2017, NRK reported that documents originated by Norwegian individuals and organizations and translated by Translate.com are openly available online, also specifically reporting on internal documents of Statoil. A couple of days later, YLE reported that it was easily able to find, via Google searches, hundreds of confidential documents originated by Finnish companies, organizations, and individuals that had been translated by Translate.com and made publicly available on the Internet. YLE reported that the license terms of Translate.com grant it the rights to keep documents translated by it, and to make them available online alongside its translation service.

== See also ==
- Machine translation
- Language interpretation
- Duolingo
- DeepL
- vidby
- LanguageTool
