= Worldcom PR Group =

Worldcom Public Relations Group
- Industry: Public Relations
- Founded: 1988
- Headquarters: New York, New York
- Key people: Serge Beckers (Group Chair); Todd Lynch (Managing Director)
- Website: https://www.worldcomgroup.com

Worldcom Public Relations Group is an international network of independently owned public relations firms, with 116 integrated communications agencies in 42 countries.

The group was established in 1988, to allow independent firms to serve national and multi-national clients while maintaining the service characteristic of independent agencies. Partner agencies must pass WORLDCOM benchmarks in areas including client services, financial operations, business and human resource management and partnership cooperation.

Co-operation between partners is fostered by the exchange of knowledge and experience at meetings on an international and regional level. The Group is governed by an elected board of directors and three regional boards with the support of a chief operating officer.

The network also conducts continuing education for partner firms through web conferencing and its Worldcom professional development workshops.

== Worldcom Group Board and Regional Committees ==
The Worldcom Public Relations Group, (Worldcom) formally installed its 2024-25 group board and regional committees during its annual global meeting in Tokyo, Japan.

=== 2025-2026 Group Board ===
- Chair - Serge Beckers (Wisse Kommunikatie, Arnhem, The Netherlands)
- Past Chair - Stefan Pollack (The Pollack Group, Los Angeles, USA)
- EMEA Chair - Caroline Prince (Yucatan, Paris, France)
- North American Region Chair - Jessica Phelan (Vault Communications, Philadelphia, PA)
- Marketing - Chris Lawrance (JBP, London, UK)
- Vendor Partnerships - Cory Stewart (Cookerly PR, Atlanta, Georgia)
- NAR, Professional Development Chair Elizabeth Marshall Black (K Harvey Brand Partners, Houston, TX)
- Asia Pacific Co-Chair - Maetavarin Maneekulpan (TQPR Thailand, Bangkok, Thailand)
- Asia Pacific Co-Chair - Voal Voal Wong (IN.FOM, Singapore)
- LATAM Committee Co-Chair - Eduardo Avella (Grupo Albion, Bogota, Colombia)
- LATAM Committee Co-Chair- Mercedes Cordova (MC Comunicaciones, Quito, Ecuador)
- Past Chair, non-voting advisory position - Todor Ianev (Janev & Janev, Sofia, Bulgaria)

=== 2025-2026 North American Committee ===
- Chair -Jessica Phelan (Vault, Philadelphia, PA)
- NAR Recruitment - John Raffetto (Raffetto Herman Strategic Communications, Seattle, WA)
- NAR Recruitment - Josslynne Welch (Litzky PR, Hoboken, NJ)
- NAR Recruitment - Tina Charpentier (Padilla, Minneapolis, MN)
- Professional Development - Elizabeth Marshall Black (KGBTexas, Houston, TX)
- Professional Development - Ryan Cohn (Sachs Media, Tallahassee, FL)
- Partnerships - Cory Stewart (Cookerly PR, Atlanta, GA)
- Peer Review (management standards assessment) - Brad Fishman (Fishman PR, Chicago, IL)

=== 2025-2026 EMEA Committee ===
- Chair - Caroline Prince (Yucatan, Paris, France)
- Past Chair - Serge Beckers (Wisse Kommunikatie, Arnhem, The Netherlands)
- Treasurer - Hans Karperien (Insticom, Brussels, Belgium)
- Peer Review - Caroline Prince (Yucatan, Paris, France)
- New Membership - Björn Mogensen (Oxenstierna, Stockholm, Sweden)
- New Membership - Stephen Forbes (Meropa, South Africa)
- Young Consultants - András R. Nagy (Probako Communications, Budapest, Hungary)
- Marketing - Chris Lawrance (JBP, London, UK)
- Professional Development/Meetings - Seyhan Ayel (OptimoreGroup, Istanbul, Turkey)

=== 2025-2026 LATAM Committee ===
- Co-Chair, Treasurer - Eduardo Avella (Grupo Albion Colombia, Bogota, Colombia)
- Co-Chair, Training - Mercedes Cordova (MC Comunmicaciones, Ecuador)
- Recruitment - Luis Avellaneda (Realidades, Lima, Peru)
- Recruitment - Diego Arvizu (Arvizu Communications, Mexico City, Mexico)
- Recruitment - Marlene Fernandez (Agencia Interamericana de Comunicación, La Uruca, Costa Rica)
- Marketing - Angélica Consiglio (Planin Comunicação, São Paulo, Brazil)

=== 2025-2026 Asia Pacific Committee ===
- Co-Chair - Voal Voal Wong (IN.FOM, Singapore)
- Co-Chair - Maetavarin Maneekulpan (TQPR Thailand, Bangkok, Thailand)
- Recruitment - Eric Lee (Cognito, Indonesia)
