= The Care of Trees =

- Company type: Private
- Industry: Tree care
- Founded: Wheeling, Illinois, United States (1967)
- Founder: John Hendricksen, Bob Hendricksen
- Headquarters: Wheeling, Illinois, United States
- Key people: Karl J. Warnke (CEO)
- Revenue: ▲US$48,989,204 (2007)
- Owner: Employee owned
- Number of employees: 350
- Website: www.thecareoftrees.com

The Care of Trees is a privately held company that provides tree care services to the greater metropolitan areas of Chicago, southwestern Connecticut, New York, Philadelphia, northern Virginia, and Washington, D.C. It is the fourth largest residential tree care company in North America. It was incorporated in 1967 as Hendricksen Tree Experts, Inc. and changed its name to The Care of Trees, Inc. in November 1988. It merged with the Davey Tree Expert Company in June 2008 and is a wholly owned subsidiary.
