= Feefighters =

FeeFighters
- Website type: payment
- Available in: English
- Founders: Sean Harper; Josh Krall; Stella Fayman; Sheel Mohnot
- Website: www.feefighters.com
- Commercial: Yes
- Launched: 2009
- Current status: Active

FeeFighters is a payment processing platform and comparison shopping website for credit card processors. The site was launched in 2009 and was acquired by Groupon in 2012. FeeFighters has been featured in The New York Times, Entrepreneur (magazine), Inc. (magazine) and TechCrunch, with BusinessWeek profiling it as "One of America's Most Promising Startups."

== History ==
FeeFighters started out as a comparison shopping site for credit card processors and eventually launched its own payment processing platform, Samurai, to facilitate payment integration for software developers, achieve PCI compliance and reduce credit card processing fees.

FeeFighters raised $1.6 million in funding from investors including 500 Startups, Hyde Park Angels, OCA Ventures and Sandbox Industries.

== Controversy ==
In 2011, FeeFighters wrote a negative blog article claiming that a company bumped its rating from an "F" to an "A" by paying the Better Business Bureau. The controversy was covered by The Today Show. As a result, the BBB pulled the company's accreditation. The BBB later admitted the pay-for-ratings incident.

== Acquisition ==
In 2012, FeeFighters was acquired by Groupon. The company became part of Groupon's Merchant Operating System strategy which was designed to provide payment processing and online scheduling.
