= Topstep =

American financial technology company

- Formerly: TopstepTrader
- Type: Private
- Industry: Financial technology
- Founded: 2012; 14 years ago
- Founder: Michael Patak (CEO)
- Website: www.topstep.com

Topstep is a trader education and fintech enterprise, headquartered in Chicago, Illinois, active in more than 170 countries worldwide and founded by Michael Patak. It specializes in evaluating the performance of day traders through real-time simulated trading accounts. Originally founded as TopstepTrader, the company rebranded as Topstep in 2020 and was the first company to run a large scale funded trader accounts model called proprietary trading.

Through its subsidiaries, Topstep offers aspiring futures traders a structured, risk-managed environment to develop trading skills, qualify for funding, and trade with the firm's capital. The program combines educational resources and community features to build discipline and ability, with the aim of enabling participants to trade without using their own capital.

Traders are required to pass an evaluation process, called the Trading Combine, a process loosely based on NFL Scouting Combines. The evaluation process consists of three steps. The first step measures the trader's profitability and risk management in a simulated account. The second step is an Express Funded Account, where trading remains in a simulated environment using market data with performance-based payouts. After passing these two steps, in the third step the trader earns a Live Funded Account in which they can trade futures contracts backed by Topstep's proprietary capital. Topstep offers three trading account sizes of $50K, $100K, or $150K buying power.

In 2026, Topstep launched its affiliate, Topstep Brokerage, an Introducing Broker, allowing traders to transfer earnings from Topstep's prop programme, or to trade using their own capital.

Topstep has been listed on Inc. 5000’s list of America’s fastest-growing private companies and the Deloitte Technology Fast 500 list.

== History ==
=== 2012–2016: Early years ===
The company was established as a Limited liability company (LLC) in July 2012 as TopstepTrader by Michael Patak, who is still the current CEO and a former Dow futures contracts floor trader at the Chicago Board of Trade. After losing $90,000 in high-risk trading, Michael fine-tuned his approach on a trading simulator with clear risk parameters, which he credits for saving his trading career. The experience of being evaluated without the risk of losses led him to starting TopstepTrader. According to the Omaha World-Herald, the name TopstepTrader was chosen because the best traders within each trading pit stand on the top step, where they have the best view and could theoretically receive the best market prices.

Topstep was amongst the "industry's first [...] funded trading" companies. Topstep launched their Trading Combine in 2012 designed specifically for retail investors seeking funded accounts. Topstep was recognized by Forbes as a Techweek Companies to Bet On in 2013 for its notable drafting process. Topstep opened its first office in the Chicago West Loop in 2013.

Founder and CEO Michael Patak was a semi-finalist in 2015 and a finalist in 2016 for the Ernst & Young Entrepreneur of the Year Award. Topstep was awarded 101 Best and Brightest Companies to Work For in 2016, 2016 Chicago Innovation Awards Finalist, and 2016 FIA Innovator.

=== 2017–2020: Scaling ===
In 2017, Inc. Magazine ranked Topstep No. 1,261 on its 36th annual Inc. 5000. In 2020, Topstep was ranked #23 on Crain's Chicago Business Best Places to Work. The company was also recognized for its active diversity hiring and retention practices, with women accounting for 60% of its executives. In 2020, the company rebranded to Topstep from TopstepTrader.

=== 2021–2026: Partnerships and product expansion ===
Topstep underwent rapid expansion during this period, across their community and partner ecosystem. In 2023, Topstep joined the FIA, a leading global trade organization for the futures, options and centrally cleared derivatives markets, also ranking #37 on Crain's Chicago Business Fast 50, an annual fastest growing companies list this year.

An agreement was signed with Plus500 to provide clearing and technology infrastructure for Topstep brokerage and broader operations. According to the Founder and CEO, Michael Patak, the exclusive partnership ensured “we can offer our customers a best-in-class brokerage experience backed by world-class technology". This collaboration accelerated Topstep’s transition from an educational platform into a full-service brokerage.

Topstep launched Topstep Brokerage in early 2026, the industry's first Introducing Broker that allows individual accounts to be funded by direct transfer of payouts earned in Topstep’s Prop Firm. Traditional funding methods are also offered, giving clients flexibility in how they build capital and fund their brokerage accounts.

In February 2026, Topstep ran a television advertising campaign featuring skier Alex Ferreira, which aired during Super Bowl LX.

==== 2025 Service disruption ====
In late 2025, Topstep, experienced a series of critical technical failures on its proprietary trading platform, TopstepX. Over multiple trading sessions, users reported widespread platform outages, delayed order executions, and situations where stop-loss and take-profit orders failed to function as expected. In several cases, traders claimed to have lost profitable positions or suffered rule violations and account closures directly attributable to these system malfunctions, rather than their own trading activity.

These events triggered significant backlash within the trading community, particularly on social media and discussion forums. Traders shared anecdotal accounts of trades not closing correctly, profit targets being ignored, and lengthy delays in customer support responses. Some discussions referred to the platform’s handling of risk controls during the outages as inadequate, further fueling community frustration.

In response to the disruptions and growing public criticism, Topstep issued an official statement acknowledging the instability and outlined plans to implement technical improvements aimed at stabilizing TopstepX and reducing support backlogs. However, as of December 21st, 2025, the company’s communications were widely perceived as insufficient by many affected traders because they did not address compensation for alleged financial losses incurred during the outages.

The outages also coincided with a noticeable deterioration in the company’s online reputation. Trustpilot ratings reportedly dropped amid an influx of negative reviews, with multiple users citing platform reliability and customer support concerns. Some reviews described the issues as indicative of broader problems in accountability and transparency.

Some customers acknowledge that Topstep addressed the service disruption by compensating affected traders and improving support responsiveness in response to the event.

== Products and services ==
Topstep's funding process consists of three steps. The first step measures the trader's profitability and risk management in a simulated account. The second step is an Express Funded Account, where trading remains in a simulated environment using market data with performance-based payouts. After passing these two steps, the trader earns a "Funded Account", in which they can trade futures backed by Topstep's proprietary capital.

In April 2022, Topstep discontinued its Forex trading program to focus on its futures trading program. It initially required traders to use third-party platforms, including NinjaTrader and Quantower routed through the Rithmic data feed, before introducing its own retail trading platform, TopstepX. Topstep traders can trade futures listed on CME, NYMEX, COMEX and CBOT exchanges.

Alongside its evaluation program, Topstep provides educational services for traders, including coaching, trading tools and performance-tracking tools, which it expanded through its 2026 acquisition of The Futures Desk. In 2023 the company launched TopstepTV, an online channel offering market commentary and trading education.

In January 2026, Topstep launched an affiliated introducing broker, Topstep Brokerage. On launching the brokerage, founder Michael Patak described it as part of a long-running aim to give traders a path to trade with either the firm's capital or their own.

== Awards ==
Topstep has been awarded 101 Best and Brightest Companies to Work For in 2016, 2016 Chicago Innovation Awards Finalist, and 2016 FIA (Futures Industry Association) Innovator. Founder and CEO Michael Patak was a semi-finalist in 2015 and a finalist in 2016 for the Ernst & Young Entrepreneur of the Year Award.
