= Kemper Direct =

US insurance company

- Company type: Former subsidiary of Kemper Corporation
- Industry: Insurance
- Founded: 2000
- Headquarters: Chicago, Illinois, USA
- Key people: Donald G. Southwell (Former President, CEO, and Chairman, Kemper Corporation)
- Products: Insurance
- Website: www.kemperdirect.com

Kemper Direct Auto and Home Insurance (Kemper Direct) was a direct to consumer auto and home insurance writer headquartered in Chicago, Illinois and a former subsidiary of Kemper Corporation.

Kemper Direct is now part of Kemper Personal Insurance, a provider of both auto and home insurance with a concentration on preferred/standard insurance.

== History ==
Unitrin Direct was founded in 2000 as a subsidiary of Unitrin, Inc. (NYSE: UTR ).

In 2002 Unitrin Direct acquired eKemper and combined the business under Unitrin Direct.

On June 29, 2007 Trinity Universal Insurance Company, a subsidiary of Unitrin Inc., purchased Merastar Insurance Company: a company based in Chattanooga, Tennessee that specialized in the sale of personal automobile, homeowners, boat, and personal umbrella insurance through employer-sponsored voluntary benefit programs. The sale was completed for a cash payment of approximately $47 Million. Merastar Insurance became a part of Unitrin Direct.

Starting August 25, 2011, Unitrin officially began operations as Kemper Corporation, with trading on the New York Stock Exchange as the KMPR ticker symbol. On May 2, 2012, Unitrin Direct officially changed its name to Kemper Direct.

On July 19, 2012, Kemper Corporation announced it would cease direct marketing activities for Kemper Direct, after having placed Kemper Direct into a runoff strategy.

== States ==
Kemper Direct provided a combination of Auto, Renters, Condo, and/or Homeowners Insurance in 28 states, including Alabama, Arizona, California, Colorado, Connecticut, Georgia, Florida, Illinois, Indiana, Iowa, Kansas, Kentucky, Louisiana, Maryland, Michigan, Minnesota, Missouri, Nevada, New Jersey, New York, Ohio, Oregon, Pennsylvania, South Carolina, Texas, Virginia, Washington, and Wisconsin.

== Other Brands ==
Kemper Direct had two other brands of its product - iMingle Insurance and Teachers.com Insurance. They offered essentially the same products as Kemper Direct and were not legally considered companies of their own. Thus, their financial ratings, underwriting guidelines, etc. were listed under Kemper Direct and not under these specialized brands.

=== iMingle Insurance ===
iMingle was targeted towards what the company called the "i Generation". iMingle launched in 2010 and was available in select states that offered Kemper Direct-branded products.

=== Teachers.com Insurance ===
Teachers.com was a brand primarily targeted towards current and retired professional educators. Teachers.com offered specialized, educator-focused discounts on auto insurance. It launched in 1992, although it was not acquired by Kemper Corporation (then Unitrin, Inc.) until 2009.
