= Horwitz, Horwitz & Associates =

American law firm

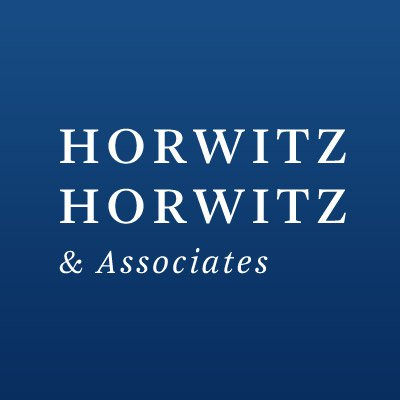
- Headquarters: Chicago
- No. of offices: 2
- No. of attorneys: 16
- Major practice areas: Personal Injury, workers' compensation, and nursing home abuse and neglect
- Key people: Jacob W. Horwitz; (founder); Mitchell Horwitz; (co-owner, head of Workers' Compensation Department); Clifford Horwitz; (co-owner, Lead Trial Attorney)
- Date founded: 1924
- Website: www.horwitzlaw.com

Horwitz, Horwitz & Associates is a Chicago, Illinois law firm that focuses its practices in personal injury, workers' compensation, nursing home abuse and neglect, and wrongful death law.

== History ==
Jacob W. Horwitz founded the law firm in 1924. Horwitz, Horwitz & Associates works in litigation for personal injury, in particular, work-related construction injuries.

== Ratings and reviews ==
In 2013 the Better Business Bureau honored Horwitz, Horwitz & Associates with an A+ rating.

== Notable cases ==
Horwitz, Horwitz & Associates has won numerous verdicts and settlements throughout Illinois, totaling over $1 billion. Horwitz, Horwitz & Associates won what was the largest non-death compensatory personal injury verdict in Illinois history as noted by the Illinois Jury Verdict Reporter.

- In 2012, Horwitz, Horwitz & Associates attorneys received a $64 million verdict, the largest in Illinois history and the second largest in U.S. history, for a Local ironworker who fell and was left paralyzed from a job-site accident.
- $64 million verdict on behalf of an injured ironworker who fell and was left paralyzed from a job-site accident. The verdict was noted as the highest jury verdict in Illinois history for an individual, beating the previous record verdict of $51 million. The National Law Journal recognized the verdict in their Top 100 verdicts of 2012.
- $10 million verdict on behalf of an injured woman who suffered from Complex Regional Pain Syndrome (CRPS) in both legs and feet after being struck in the right calf by a hand-truck carrying around 350 lbs. of milk cartons. The Illinois Jury Verdict Reporter confirmed the verdict as the largest CRPS injury verdict in Illinois.
- $8 million verdict on behalf of an injured journeyman ironworker who suffered from a serious shoulder injury after a barge collided with his safety skiff attached to a construction work-flat. The Illinois Jury Verdict Reporter confirmed the verdict as the largest adult male shoulder injury verdict in Illinois, beating the previous record of $3.8 million. LexisNexis featured the summary on their Case of the Week.
- $5.7 million verdict on behalf of an injured journeyman carpenter who suffered stage III CRPS-II (causalgia) after a drill bit punctured his hand, wrapping the ulnar nerve. The Illinois Jury Verdict Reporter confirmed the verdict as the largest non-amputation hand injury verdict in Illinois, beating the previous record of $4.2 million.
- Illinois Supreme Court Case on Temporary Total Disability Benefits - Justices' ruled in a unanimous 7-0 decision, agreeing with Horwitz, Horwitz & Associates attorney, Marc A. Perper, that when a worker receiving Total Temporary Disability (TTD) benefits due to a work-related injury is terminated, regardless of "cause", the employer must continue to pay benefits until the worker has been made whole or reaches maximum recovery.

== Community involvement ==
- Horwitz, Horwitz & Associates Fair Housing Scholarship - provides assistance to students who have completed their first year of study and are enrolled in The John Marshall Law School Fair Housing Clinic Preference.
- A Walk for Hope (2012 and 2013) Sponsor - Mutual Ground's annual walk fundraiser helps raise awareness about the crimes of domestic violence and sexual assault. In addition, the annual walk raises money to help victims of domestic violence and sexual assault become survivors.
- Hot Chocolate 15/5K America's Sweetest Race, Horwitz, Horwitz & Associates walkers and runners raised money for the Ronald McDonald House and Little City Foundation.
