= Islamica =

American company selling Islam-themed goods

- Founded: 1999; 27 years ago
- Founders: Mirza Baig, Azher Ahmed, Afeef Abdul-Majeed
- Headquarters: Chicago, Illinois, U.S.

Islamica is an Islamic company founded in Chicago, Illinois that sells apparel, accessories and media marketed towards Muslim youth. It was founded in 1999 by Mirza Baig, Azher Ahmed and Afeef Abdul-Majeed.

Islamica hosts an internet forum which is one of the busiest Muslim websites in North America. Islamica News offers Muslim-oriented parody news.

The Islamica Community forum, is still up and running online. However, public indicators suggest that current activity levels are limited. There are only a few registered members, and not much recent visible chatting or posts. This indicates that the forum may have had higher levels of activity in earlier years, but now shows substantially less participation.

Islamica News, one of the company’s media projects, identifies itself as a satirical site. The website clearly states that all the content and characters are made-up and meant purely for comedic purposes. This puts it in the genre of parody or satirical news, rather than real reporting like a regular news outlet. That difference distinguishes Islamica News from traditional news organizations and identifies it as a humor-focused part of the company’s media activities.
