= Bell Flavors & Fragrances =

- Formerly: William M. Bell Company
- Type: Private
- Industry: Flavors and fragrances
- Founded: 1912; 114 years ago in Chicago, Illinois, U.S.
- Founder: William M. Bell
- Headquarters: Northbrook, Illinois, U.S.
- Area served: Worldwide
- Key people: Jim Heinz (chairman); Ron Stark (president and CEO)
- Products: Flavors, fragrances, botanical extracts and specialty ingredients
- Owner: Heinz family
- Website: bellff.com

Bell Flavors & Fragrances is an American privately held manufacturer of flavors, fragrances, botanical extracts and specialty ingredients headquartered in Northbrook, Illinois.

The company was founded in Chicago in 1912 as the William M. Bell Company. Edward N. Heinz acquired the business in 1968, and the company has remained privately owned by the Heinz family.

== History ==
=== Founding and early development ===
The William M. Bell Company was founded in Chicago in 1912 by William M. Bell, a flavor chemist with experience in confectionery applications. The business initially supplied flavors to local ice cream parlors, grocery stores and soft-drink shops.

After William Bell's death, the business was eventually acquired by Theonett & Company. In 1968, flavor chemist and industry executive Edward N. Heinz purchased the William M. Bell Company and became its president. Heinz had previously worked for Food Materials Corporation and had served as president of the Flavor Extract Manufacturers Association, now known as the Flavor and Extract Manufacturers Association.

The company moved its operations from Chicago to Melrose Park, Illinois, in 1974. In 1976, it acquired Maumee Flavors & Fragrances of Danbury, Connecticut. According to the company's historical account, Maumee produced flavors, fragrances and anthranilate ingredients used in berry and grape flavor formulations.

In 1979, Bell acquired Chicago-based fragrance company Roubechez, Inc., which developed fragrances for candles, soaps, detergents and household-care products. Around this period, the company adopted the Bell Flavors & Fragrances name.

In 1981, Bell acquired the flavor division of Stepan Company and moved its headquarters to Northbrook, Illinois. Northbrook has remained the company's global headquarters.

During the 1980s, Bell expanded its flavor, fragrance and specialty-ingredient operations through additional acquisitions. These included American Brosynthetics Corporation and California-based Ritter Company in 1985.

=== International expansion ===
In 1993, Bell acquired the former Schimmel flavor and fragrance operations in Leipzig, Germany. The Saxon State Archives records that Bell took over the former Schimmel works in Miltitz in 1993.

The Leipzig operation traces part of its history to Schimmel & Co., a German fragrance and essential-oil business with nineteenth-century origins. The site also houses the Schimmel Library, established in 1878. The library contains approximately 30,000 items relating to essential oils, food chemistry, flavors, fragrances and plant extracts.

In 1994, Bell acquired a manufacturing plant in Middletown, New York, which became a production location for fragrances and botanical extracts. The following year, it acquired Naturome, a flavor company based in Brossard, Quebec.

Bell expanded its Latin American operations in 2001 through the acquisition of Empresa Industrializadora de Guadalajara (EIGSA), a flavor and fragrance manufacturer in Guadalajara, Mexico.

EIGSA had been established in 1952 and produced flavors and ingredients for beverage, bakery, confectionery and dairy applications, as well as fragrances for personal-care products.

In 2013, Bell acquired the flavor division of Iceberg Industries in São Paulo, Brazil. The acquired facility manufactured flavors, fragrances and botanical extracts for the South American market.

In 2019, Bell opened a culinary center and office in Ketton, England. The facility combined culinary development with flavor research and product applications.

=== Recent developments ===
In September 2018, Bell appointed Ron Stark as president and chief operating officer. Stark had previously served as vice president of North American sales at Givaudan.

Stark later became president and chief executive officer, while Jim Heinz became chairman.

In 2023, Bell commissioned a production facility in Sri City, India, and opened the Bell Technology and Innovation Center at its Northbrook headquarters.

In October 2024, Bell opened a 6,500-square-foot (600 m^{2}) Consumer Science Sensory Center at its Northbrook campus. The facility includes sensory-testing booths, a viewing area, kitchen and workspaces and is used for consumer and sensory research related to the development of flavors and fragrances.

== Operations ==
Bell develops and manufactures flavors, fragrances, botanical extracts and specialty ingredients for industrial customers. Its markets include food and beverages, pet care, personal care, household products and fine fragrances.

The company's global headquarters are in Northbrook, Illinois. A 2025 profile by the Northbrook Chamber of Commerce reported that approximately 350 employees worked at its Northbrook operations. The campus includes manufacturing, research and development, consumer-testing and corporate facilities.

Bell has manufacturing and development operations across North America, South America, Europe and Asia. Its expansion has included operations in the United States, Canada, Mexico, Germany, Brazil, China and India.

=== European operations ===
Bell's European operations are centered on its manufacturing and research site in Leipzig-Miltitz, Germany. Bell acquired the former Schimmel operations there in 1993.

The site includes the historical Schimmel Library. According to Leipzig University of Applied Sciences, its approximately 30,000-item collection contains literature on food chemistry and technology, essential oils, flavors, fragrances, synthetic ingredients and botanical extracts, as well as historical industry publications.

== Ownership and management ==
Bell Flavors & Fragrances is privately owned by the Heinz family. Edward N. Heinz acquired the company in 1968, and subsequent generations of the family remained involved in its ownership and management.

As of 2025, Jim Heinz served as chairman and Ron Stark as president and chief executive officer. In February 2025, Bell appointed Lee Brooks as chief operating officer. Brooks had previously managed global flavor and fragrance operations for Bell and had earlier worked for Givaudan.
