= Nerdio =

American information technology company

- Formerly: Adar, Inc
- Type: Private
- Industry: Software
- Founded: 2020; 6 years ago
- Founders: Vadim Vladimirskiy, Joseph Landes
- Headquarters: Chicago, Illinois, United States
- Area served: Global
- Key people: Vadim Vladimirskiy (CEO) Joseph Landes (CRO)
- Products: Nerdio Manager for Enterprise, Nerdio Manager for MSP
- Website: getnerdio.com

Nerdio is an American Information Technology (IT) company headquartered in Chicago that specialises in providing virtual desktop implementations for businesses. The company provides streaming IT and IT-as-a-service to small and medium-sized enterprises (SMEs).

The company offers two products: Nerdio Private Cloud and Nerdio for Azure.

== History ==
The company was founded as Adar, Inc in 2005 by Vadim Vladimirskiy, Stuart Gabel and Niall Keegan to provide online backup systems to SMEs. Soon after it was founded, the company transitioned into managing virtual infrastructure.

In 2007, it introduced Adar Private Cloud.

In January 2014, the company secured $2.4 million in Series A funding from MK Capital, which allowed it to expand and improve its products and services.

Adar Private Cloud was nominated for the CityLIGHTS Rising Star Award in July 2015. One year later, the company rebranded and launched Nerdio Private Cloud.

In 2017, the company introduced Nerdio for Azure. The company's CEO, Vadim Vladimirskiy, was nominated for the CityLIGHTS Technologist of the Year Award in 2018.

In January 2020, Nerdio split from Adar, Inc. and formed its own entity. Adar, Inc was acquired by private equity and the name ceased to exists.

In March 2025, the company raised $500 million in a series C Round of funding.

== See also ==
- VMware
- Virtual desktop
- Virtual Servers
- IT-as-a-service
- Web desktop
