= Amcol International Corporation =

Manufacturer based in Illinois, United States

AMCOL International Corporation
- Industry: Chemicals
- Founded: 1927
- Headquarters: Hoffman Estates, Illinois
- Area served: Global
- Products: Specialty Materials
- Number of employees: 2400
- Website: www.amcol.com

AMCOL International Corporation is a company that mines, processes, and distributes chemical products based in Hoffman Estates, IL. The Company also offers clays for use as a moisture barrier in commercial construction.

On February 14, 2014, AMCOL International Corporation announced that it has signed a merger agreement with Imerys. The merger, however, was terminated after AMCOL received a rival bid from Minerals Technologies, which AMCOL, deemed to be a superior bid.

On May 9, 2014, Minerals Technologies Inc., a New York Based international minerals supplier, acquired all the outstanding shares of AMCOL International Corporation. Minerals Technologies is traded on the New York Stock Exchange under the symbol MTX.

AMCOL International Corp. was a specialty materials and chemicals manufacturer based in Hoffman Estates, Illinois, United States. AMCOL International is no longer traded on the New York Stock Exchange.
