= Adeptia =

American software company

Adeptia Inc.
- Type: Private
- Industry: Computer software
- Founded: 2000; 26 years ago
- Headquarters: Jupiter, FL, United States
- Products: Adeptia Automate
- Website: adeptia.com

Adeptia is a Jupiter, Florida based software company. It provides an application to exchange business data with other companies using a self-service integration approach. This business software helps organizations create automated data connections to their customers and partners, and automate pre-processing and post-processing steps such as data validation, exception handling, and back-end data integration.

Adeptia was acquired by PSG Equity, a private-equity company based in Boston, however, Adeptia continues to operate as an independent software company in the PSG portfolio.

== Functionality and operation ==
Adeptia's products are designed to help on-board customer data, implement real-time interfaces between systems, connect with cloud applications, automate business processes, publish APIs, Electronic Data Interchange (EDI) integration, and enable Service-oriented architecture (SOA). Adeptia is being used by organizations in various industries including Insurance, Financial Services, Manufacturing, Logistics, Government, Health care, and Retail. Adeptia technology provides Data Integration, Enterprise Application Integration (EAI), and Business-to-business (B2B) Integration software capabilities.

Adeptia technology has been developed using Java, XML, and Web Services technologies. They are available in both traditional on-premises and cloud-delivery models. For cloud deployments, Adeptia utilizes the Amazon Elastic Compute Cloud (EC2).

Adeptia is notable for enabling business analysts and non-technical users to configure data integrations using a no-code web-browser user interface, rather than developer tool approach, although multiple other vendors now offer similar capabilities. Its Adeptia Connect technology is positioned by the company as an "all-in-one" business integration software on the market that combines Data Integration, Enterprise Application Integration, and Business-to-Business EDI capability on a core SOA architecture.

== History ==
Adeptia was founded in 2000 and its headquarters are situated in Chicago, IL. It has a wholly owned Research and Development Center in New Delhi, India.

In November 2014, Lou Ennuso, CEO of Adeptia, was inducted as a member of the University of Illinois at Chicago (UIC) Entrepreneurship Hall of Fame.

In January 2023, PSG Equity invested $65M in Adeptia.

== See also ==
- Enterprise Application Integration
- Enterprise service bus
- Comparison of business integration software
