= Bixbee =

Bixbee, was a benefit corporation based in Chicago, Illinois. Bixbee was co-founded in 2013 by Luis M. Garcia and Kalon R. Gutierrez. The company designed and sold children's products with a "One Here. One There." mission: for every backpack purchased, a schoolbag with supplies is donated to a child in need.

As of May 2025, Bixbee is no longer in operation.
