= Ecycler =

ecycler
- Type: Private
- Industry: Environmental technology
- Founded: 2009
- Headquarters: Lake Forest, Illinois
- Website: ecycler.com

ecycler is an environmental technology company and brand that provides a marketplace for discarders and collectors of recyclable waste in areas where no organized pickup is available.

== Profile ==
The company's web site can also be used by households, institutions or businesses that do have curb-side recycling but want to have their recyclables picked up when and where they desire. If a collector of recyclables is not yet available in an area, the people discarding recyclables may post their materials on a bulletin board-an area ecycler calls the "recycling exchange." New or existing collectors may view materials listed on the exchange and then contact the discarder for a pick-up.

The site is driven by individual collectors who establish their own ecycler recycling programs. Collectors can create and market their own ecycler recycling programs by downloading posters generated by ecycler.com and then posting them in public places. Ecycler provides personalized business cards to collectors making them "independent collectors" and allowing them to share in the use of the ecycler name in setting up their recycling programs in their community.

Ecycler encourages people to discard their recyclables for free; however, discarders can request a portion of the proceeds from the collector. Collectors can take the recyclables to a redemption center or reverse vending machine and make either 100% profit or they can make a 60% profit by giving 40% to the person from whom they collected the recyclables. It is up to the person discarding the recyclables whether or not they want to simply give them away or earn some money themselves.

The deposit-refund system was created by the beverage industry as a way to guarantee the return of their glass bottles to be washed, refilled and resold, filterforgood.com explains.

For non-traditional materials (tennis balls, wine bottle corks, eyeglasses, et al.) ecycler offers the opportunity to recycle these items that are not usually recyclable via local recycling centers.

== History ==
The company was founded in February 2009 and launched to the public at TechCrunch50 2009. Although, the company was based in Lake Forest, Illinois, ecycler went live with its Canada specific site in April 2010.

Ecycler ceased its US and Canada operations on December 31, 2013.

== Press and awards ==
- 2012 Illinois Technology Association CityLIGHTS Finalist
- 2011 Named as one of the U.S. Chamber of Commerce 25 Free Enterprise Honorees for the "DREAM BIG Small Business of the Year Award"
- 2011 Won the Fairfield Small Business Challenge
- 2010 Nominated for the Chicago Innovation Awards
- 2010 One of Ten finalist in the Fairfield Small Business Challenge

== Technology ==
Ecycler is hosted on a cloud computing platform developed on the LAMP stack.

Ecycler released an iOS application titled iCanRecycle in August 2011.
