= Metropolis Coffee Company =

American coffee roaster, wholesaler, producer and retailer

- Type: Private
- Industry: Coffee roasting, wholesale, and retail
- Founded: December 2003
- Founders: Jeff Dreyfuss; Tony Dreyfuss
- Headquarters: Chicago, Illinois, United States
- Key people: Anne Djerai (CEO); Tony Dreyfuss (president)
- Products: Coffee and coffee capsules
- Website: www.metropoliscoffee.com

Metropolis Coffee Company is a family-owned coffee roaster, wholesaler, private-label producer, and retailer based in Chicago, Illinois. Founded in 2003 by Jeff and Tony Dreyfuss, the company operates an Edgewater cafe and an 18,000-square-foot roastery in Avondale; its brand is also used at a partner-operated cafe in Terminal 5 at O'Hare International Airport.

== History ==
Jeff and Tony Dreyfuss opened Metropolis near Loyola University Chicago in December 2003. In 2005, Newcity named it the best place in Chicago to buy coffee beans and noted a campaign that donated $2 to Oxfam for each pound sold. Roast named Metropolis its 2007 Micro Roaster of the Year.

In 2009, Metropolis and the disability-services nonprofit Aspire created Aspire CoffeeWorks, a social enterprise providing paid work and job experience for adults with developmental disabilities. Proceeds from the coffee brand support Aspire's programs.

By 2010, the company had moved all roasting from the original cafe to a warehouse in Andersonville. Metropolis coffees received Good Food Awards in 2014 and 2015. In September 2015, it opened an 18,000-square-foot roastery at Rockwell on the River in Avondale, replacing the Andersonville space.

During the COVID-19 pandemic, the Edgewater cafe operated in reduced formats before temporarily closing in February 2021. It reopened that June with a revised menu and layout.

Anne Djerai was promoted to chief executive officer in December 2022 as Metropolis expanded its co-packing business and began producing compostable espresso capsules compatible with Nespresso Original machines. A Metropolis-branded cafe began operating at O'Hare's Terminal 5 in 2024 through local airport-concession partners. In 2024, the Avondale roastery produced more than one million pounds of coffee annually.
