= ParkWhiz =

E-parking service

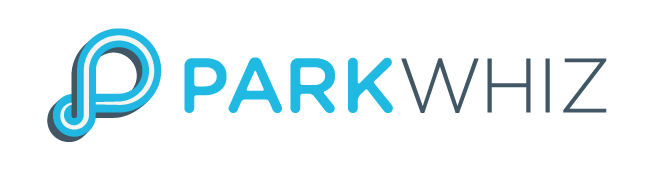
- Type: Private
- Industry: E-parking
- Founded: 2006; 20 years ago
- Founders: Aashish Dalal, Jon Thornton
- Headquarters: Chicago, Illinois
- Number of locations: Chicago; New York City; Boston; Indianapolis
- Area served: United States
- Key people: Yona Shtern (CEO)
- Products: Web and mobile e-parking applications
- Number of employees: 100
- Website: www.parkwhiz.com

ParkWhiz is an e-parking service that allows users to book parking spaces before reaching their destinations. ParkWhiz headquarters is located in Chicago, Illinois.

== Origins ==
ParkWhiz was founded in 2006 by Aashish Dalal and Jon Thornton. The company CEO is Yona Shtern. ParkWhiz works with 4,000 parking facilities in over 50 major cities and 35 states. Founders Dalal and Thornton conceived the ParkWhiz concept in 2004 after becoming frustrated with the problem of locating parking during baseball games. While parking spaces were available at various parking facilities, there was no organized system for determining their location or their price. ParkWhiz service allows users to locate and purchase parking spaces online and on mobile devices before reaching their destinations. As of March 2019 ParkWhiz employs over 100 people in the United States, Israel and the Philippines.

== Services ==
ParkWhiz allows drivers to locate and purchase daily, monthly, and event-based parking through its web and mobile applications. Users of the ParkWhiz service are able to compare prices, locations, and amenities. After drivers select a spot and process their payment, they are given an electronic parking pass that can be printed or presented on a smartphone or tablet.

In 2013, as part of its first growth beyond Chicago, ParkWhiz expanded its monthly parking feature to New York City, offering approximately 200 locations.

The company organized parking for the Super Bowl in 2010 and parked an estimated 30% of Super Bowl traffic in 2012.

== Partnerships and acquisitions ==
- In late 2015, ParkWhiz acquired BestParking.
- A partnership with Ford was announced at the Detroit Auto Show in 2016, where a range of ParkWhiz services including that smart parking would be integrated into the FordPass app.
- In 2018, ParkWhiz acquired CodiPark, a Tel Aviv-based company, to add drive up mobile payments to its platform.
- Also in 2018, ParkWhiz paired with Groupon to offer ParkWhiz's services through the Groupon app.
- ParkWhiz is a partner app in Concur's app center, allowing Concur users and business travellers to mail e-receipts from ParkWhiz bookings.
- ParkWhiz is the official parking provider for StubHub. Customers who buy tickets on StubHub are offered parking through ParkWhiz.
- ParkWhiz is an official partner of Barclays Center in Brooklyn, NY, with dasherboard ads and in-game promotions running during select New York Islanders hockey games.
- ParkWhiz is the official parking app of the Boston Red Sox.
- In late 2018, ParkWhiz began a partnership with GasBuddy on their app, connected to their "Pay With Gasbuddy" service.
- Also in 2018, ParkWhiz partnered with TomTom to provide integrated parking information for TomTom mapping services.

== Financial information ==
The company was a bootstrapped venture until December 2012 when it raised $2 million in Series A funding led by Hyde Park Venture Partners. Other investors in the round included: Alexis Ohanian of Reddit, Ira Weiss, Henry J. Feinberg, and Amicus Capital. ParkWhiz reported that the funding was used to broaden the company's reach and prepare for its first iOS and Android app releases. In July 2014, ParkWhiz raised $10 million in a Series B round of funding led by venture fund Jump Capital. The Series B round has allowed ParkWhiz to improve its mobile experience, expand its offerings and hire additional employees. At the End of 2015, ParkWhiz raised $24 million in a Series C round of funding led by Baird Capital with participation by growth capital investor Beringea and existing investor Jump Capital.
