= Steadfast Networks =

Chicago, Illinois-based Internet service provider

- Company type: Private company
- Industry: Web hosting service, Internet service provider
- Founded: Fond du Lac, WI, 1998
- Headquarters: Chicago, Illinois, United States
- Key people: Karl Zimmerman
- Products: Web services
- Website: www.Steadfast.net

Steadfast Networks was a Chicago, Illinois-based Internet service provider primarily focused on Cloud Computing, Dedicated Servers and Colocation. Founded in 1998 by then high-school student Karl Zimmerman in Fond du Lac, Wisconsin, Steadfast Networks was acquired by ColoHouse, a global provider of colocation, cloud, and managed services, in 2021. It was originally a division of Nozone, Inc., a company founded by Zimmerman and incorporated in 2000.

== History ==
In 2008, Steadfast Networks was named number 370 on the Inc 500 5000 Fastest Growing Private Companies in America List and was on the Inc 5000 List of the Largest Companies in America in both 2009 and 2010.

In 2021, ColoHouse acquired Steadfast Networks, including its three data center locations in Chicago and Edison, New Jersey. The acquisition also included Steadfast's cloud and hosting solutions. Steadfast's then-CFO Paul Voswinkel stated that "ColoHouse is bringing together best in breed digital infrastructure solutions to create a single IT provider that can deliver complete enterprise solutions."

== Locations ==
Prior to its acquisition, Steadfast had datacenter facilities in three locations: Two in downtown Chicago and one in Edison, New Jersey. These locations were incorporated into the ColoHouse portfolio following the acquisition.

Steadfast also maintained a private network with peering points throughout the United States along with London and Amsterdam.

== Controversy ==
In November 2007 the Chicago Tribune published an article on the hosting of hate sites in America, where they are protected by the First Amendment. The Anti-Defamation League noted that Steadfast hosted 17 such sites. Steadfast responded on the official company blog to clarify that they are strong supporters of the First Amendment, but against hate speech.
