= List of Illinois companies =

Top publicly traded companies in Illinois according to revenues with state and U.S. rankings
State rank	Corporation	US rank
1	Archer Daniels Midland	27
2	Boeing	30
3	Walgreen	37
4	Caterpillar Inc.	42
5	State Farm	44
6	Abbott Laboratories	70
7	Sears Holdings	71
8	United Continental	79
9	Deere	85
10	Mondelez International	88
11	Allstate	92
12	McDonald's	111
13	Exelon	129
14	Kraft Foods	151
15	IL Tool Works	155
16	Baxter	193
17	Navistar	216
18	RR Donnelley	264
19	CDW	267
20	Hillshire Brands	288
21	Discover Financial	294
22	W. W. Grainger	295
23	Motorola Solutions	304
24	Dover Corporation	308
25	Tenneco	349
26	OfficeMax	367
27	Ingredion	386
28	Anixter	405
29	CF Industries	419
30	Telephone and Data Systems	468
31	Essendant	484
32	Old Republic International	496
Source: Fortune 500 2013

This is a list of Illinois companies which includes notable companies that are headquartered in Illinois, or were previously headquartered in Illinois. In general, this list does not include companies headquartered in one of the municipalities of the Chicago metropolitan area.

== Companies based in Illinois ==
=== A ===
- Abbott Laboratories
- Abbvie
- Abt Electronics
- Adams Street Partners
- Alliant Credit Union
- Allstate
- Alton Steel
- American River Transportation Company
- Amoco
- Anixter
- Archer Daniels Midland
- Arthur J. Gallagher & Co.
- Astro-Physics
- Axium Foods

=== B ===
- Basler Electric
- Baxter
- Beer Nuts
- Believers Broadcasting Corporation
- Bell Sports
- Belly
- BenchPrep
- Black Dog Books
- BMO US
- Braintree
- Brewer Investment Group
- Bunn-O-Matic Corporation
- Busey Bank
- Byline Bank

=== C ===
- Cars.com
- Cboe Global Markets
- CDW
- CF Industries
- Citizens Equity First Credit Union
- City Water, Light & Power
- CIVC Partners
- CME Group
- CNA Financial
- Conagra Brands
- Consolidated Communications
- Country Financial
- CRRC Sifang America

=== D ===
- Dawn Equipment Company
- Detonics
- Discover Financial
- Donnelley Financial Solutions
- Dot Foods
- Dover Corporation

=== E ===
- Elliott Aviation
- Essendant
- Estwing
- Exelon

=== F ===
- Federal Signal Corporation
- Ferrara Candy Company
- Follett Corporation
- The Frantz Manufacturing Company
- Frasca International

=== G ===
- Gardner Denver
- GE Healthcare
- Glik's
- GlobalTap
- GoHealth
- Golub Capital
- Greenlee
- Group O
- Groupon
- Growmark
- Grubhub
- GTCR

=== H ===
- Harrisonville Telephone Company
- Hill-Rom
- Horace Mann Educators Corporation
- Horizon Hobby
- Hyatt

=== I ===
- Ideal Industries
- Illinois National Bank
- Illinois Tool Works
- IMC Financial Markets
- Invenergy

=== J ===
- Jenner & Block
- Jimmy John's
- JLL
- John Deere

=== K ===
- Katten Muchin Rosenman
- Kemper Corporation
- Kirkland & Ellis
- Kraft Foods
- Kraft Heinz
- Kress Corporation

=== L ===
- Legacy Audio
- Levi, Ray & Shoup
- Life Fitness
- Lightbank

=== M ===
- Madison Dearborn Partners
- Maui Jim
- Mayer Brown
- McDermott Will & Emery
- McDonald's
- Meatheads Burgers & Fries
- Mesirow Financial
- Metropolitan Educational Enterprises
- Mondelez International
- Monical's Pizza
- Morningstar, Inc.
- Morton Salt
- Motorola Mobility
- Motorola Solutions
- Mrs. Fisher's

=== N ===
- Nalco Holding Company
- National Railway Equipment Company
- Navistar International
- Northern Trust
- Nuveen

=== O ===
- Oberweis Dairy

=== P ===
- Pacific Bearing Company
- Packaging Corporation of America
- Pactiv
- ParkWhiz
- Peapod
- Peoria Charter Coach Company
- Pioneer Railcorp
- Plochman's
- Portillo's Restaurants
- Potbelly Sandwich Shop

=== Q ===
- QCR Holdings
- Quincy Media

=== R ===
- RLI Corp.
- Road Ranger
- Rock River Arms
- RR Donnelley
- Rural King

=== S ===
- Safeway Insurance Group
- Sears & Roebuck
- Shakespeare Squared
- Shaw Media
- Sidley Austin
- Skidmore, Owings & Merrill
- SpotHero
- Springfield Armory, Inc.
- STARadio Corporation
- State Farm
- Suburban Express

=== T ===
- Testor Corporation
- Thoma Bravo
- Thomas Research Products
- Titan Tire Corporation
- Tower Hobbies
- Trend Is Dead! Records
- Tri-State Christian Television

=== U ===
- Ulta Beauty
- United Airlines
- Uptake

=== V ===
- Vivid Seats
- Volition

=== W ===
- Wahl Clipper
- Walgreens Boots Alliance
- West Monroe Partners
- Western Cartridge Company
- Wicks Organ Company
- Winston & Strawn
- Wintrust
- Wiss, Janney, Elstner Associates, Inc.
- Wolfram Research, Inc.
- Wrigley Company

=== Z ===
- Zebra Technologies

== Companies formerly based in Illinois ==
=== A ===
- A. E. Staley
- ArmaLite
- Aventine Renewable Energy

=== C ===
- Container Corporation of America

=== D ===
- DeKalb Genetics Corporation

=== H ===
- Hilander Foods
- Hobbico

=== L ===
- Lincoln Land Express

=== M ===
- Montgomery Ward

=== N ===
- Nortrax

=== R ===
- Ryan International Airlines

=== S ===
- Sears & Roebuck
- Sundstrand Corporation

== See also ==
- List of breweries in Illinois
- List of casinos in Illinois
- List of companies in the Chicago metropolitan area
- List of newspapers in Illinois
- List of wineries in Illinois
