= Aventinus =

Aventinus may refer to:

Places:

- Aventinus, Latin name of Abensberg, Germany
- Aventine Hill, named after Aventinus, king of Alba and Latium

Persons:

- Aventinus (mythology), son of Hercules and Rhea
- Aventinus of Alba Longa, descendant of Aeneas, king of the Latins (future Rome site)
- Saint Aventinus (d. c 537), disciple of St. Loup
- Aventinus of Tours (d. 1180), hermit and saint
- Johannes Aventinus, Bavarian historian and philologist

Others:

- Aventinus (beer), a wheat doppelbock brewed by G. Schneider & Sohn, in Bavaria, Germany

== See also ==
- Aventine
