= 2015 Fred's 250 =

19th race of the 2015 NASCAR Camping World Truck Series

2015 fred's 250
Race details
- Race 19 of 23 of the 2015 NASCAR Camping World Truck Series
- Date: October 24, 2015
- Official name: 10th Annual fred's 250
- Location: Talladega Superspeedway, Lincoln, Alabama
- Course: Permanent racing facility
- Course length: 2.66 miles (4.28 km)
- Distance: 98 laps, 260 mi (419 km)
- Scheduled distance: 94 laps, 250 mi (402 km)
- Average speed: 130.051 mph (209.297 km/h)

Pole position
| Driver | Timothy Peters | Red Horse Racing |
- Time: 53.706

Most laps led
| Driver | Matt Crafton | ThorSport Racing |
- Laps: 43

Winner
| No. 17 | Timothy Peters | Red Horse Racing |

Television in the United States
- Network: FOX
- Announcers: Adam Alexander, Michael Waltrip, and Kevin Harvick

Radio in the United States
- Radio: MRN

The 2015 Fred's 250 was the 19th stock car race of the 2015 NASCAR Camping World Truck Series, and the 10th iteration of the event. The race was held on Saturday, October 24, 2015, in Lincoln, Alabama at Talladega Superspeedway, a 2.66 mi (4.28 km) permanent tri-oval shaped racetrack. The race was increased from 94 to 98 laps, due to a NASCAR overtime finish. Timothy Peters, driving for Red Horse Racing, would win the race after leading when caution came out on the final lap. This was Peters' ninth career NASCAR Camping World Truck Series win, his first of the season, and his second consecutive win at Talladega. Starting on the pole, Peters led a total of 23 laps, with Matt Crafton leading the most laps with 43. To fill out the podium, Brandon Jones, driving for GMS Racing, and Mason Mingus, driving for Billy Boat Motorsports, would finish 2nd and 3rd, respectively.

== Background ==
The layout of Talladega Superspeedway, the circuit where the race was held.

Talladega Superspeedway, nicknamed "Dega", and formerly named Alabama International Motor Speedway (AIMS) from 1969 to 1989, is a motorsports complex located in Lincoln, Alabama, north of Talladega, Alabama. It is located on the former Anniston Air Force Base. A tri-oval, the track was constructed in 1969 by the International Speedway Corporation, a business controlled by the France Family. As of 2015, the track hosts the NASCAR Sprint Cup Series, NASCAR Xfinity Series, NASCAR Camping World Truck Series, and ARCA Racing Series. Talladega is the longest NASCAR oval, with a length of 2.660 mi (4.281 km), compared to the Daytona International Speedway, which is 2.500 mi (4.023 km) long. The total peak capacity of Talladega is around 175,000 spectators, with the main grandstand capacity being about 80,000.

=== Entry list ===
- (R) denotes rookie driver.
- (i) denotes driver who is ineligible for series driver points.

| # | Driver | Team | Make | Sponsor |
|---|---|---|---|---|
| 1 | Travis Kvapil | MAKE Motorsports | Chevrolet | Bad Boy Mowers |
| 02 | Tyler Young | Young's Motorsports | Chevrolet | AKL Insurance Group |
| 4 | Erik Jones (R) | Kyle Busch Motorsports | Toyota | Toyota |
| 05 | John Wes Townley | Athenian Motorsports | Chevrolet | Zaxby's |
| 6 | Norm Benning | Norm Benning Racing | Chevrolet | Norm Benning Racing |
| 07 | Ray Black Jr. (R) | SS-Green Light Racing | Chevrolet | ScubaLife |
| 08 | Korbin Forrister (R) | BJMM with SS-Green Light Racing | Chevrolet | Tilted Kilt |
| 8 | John Hunter Nemechek (R) | SWM-NEMCO Motorsports | Chevrolet | SWM-NEMCO Motorsports |
| 10 | Jennifer Jo Cobb | Jennifer Jo Cobb Racing | Chevrolet | V. G. Pride Group |
| 11 | Ben Kennedy | Red Horse Racing | Toyota | Local Motors |
| 13 | Cameron Hayley (R) | ThorSport Racing | Toyota | Mattei, Carolina Nut Co. |
| 14 | Daniel Hemric (R) | NTS Motorsports | Chevrolet | California Clean Power |
| 15 | Mason Mingus | Billy Boat Motorsports | Chevrolet | Call 811 Before You Dig |
| 16 | Chad Boat | Billy Boat Motorsports | Chevrolet | Pristine Auction |
| 17 | Timothy Peters | Red Horse Racing | Toyota | Red Horse Racing |
| 19 | Tyler Reddick | Brad Keselowski Racing | Ford | Stoney Creek Records |
| 23 | Spencer Gallagher (R) | GMS Racing | Chevrolet | Allegiant Travel Company |
| 28 | Andy Seuss | FDNY Racing | Chevrolet | FDNY, Cancer Wellness TV |
| 29 | Brian Keselowski | Brad Keselowski Racing | Ford | Cooper-Standard Automotive |
| 30 | Terry Jones | Rette Jones Racing | Chevrolet | Nortrax |
| 33 | Brandon Jones (R) | GMS Racing | Chevrolet | Wittichen Supply Company |
| 36 | Bobby Gerhart (i) | Bobby Gerhart Racing | Chevrolet | Lucas Oil |
| 45 | Chris Fontaine | Glenden Enterprises | Toyota | Glenden Enterprises, Racktail.com |
| 50 | Ryan Ellis | MAKE Motorsports | Chevrolet | PTR Industries, Inc. |
| 51 | Matt Tifft | Kyle Busch Motorsports | Toyota | Waves for Water |
| 54 | Christopher Bell | Kyle Busch Motorsports | Toyota | JBL |
| 63 | Tyler Tanner | MB Motorsports | Chevrolet | Mittler Bros., Ski Soda |
| 68 | Clay Greenfield | Clay Greenfield Motorsports | Chevrolet | ClutchDefense.com |
| 74 | Jordan Anderson | Mike Harmon Racing | Chevrolet | Rusty's Off Road |
| 82 | Austin Hill | Empire Racing | Ford | Empire Racing Driver Development |
| 88 | Matt Crafton | ThorSport Racing | Toyota | Hormel, Menards |
| 91 | Stanton Barrett (i) | Stanton Barrett Motorsports | Chevrolet | NavySEALsvsZombies.com |
| 94 | Timmy Hill | Premium Motorsports | Chevrolet | Testoril, Champion Machinery |
| 98 | Johnny Sauter | ThorSport Racing | Toyota | Nextant Aerospace, Curb Records |
Official entry list

== Practice ==
=== First practice ===
The first practice session was held on Friday, October 23, at 12:00 PM CST, and would last for 55 minutes. John Hunter Nemechek, driving for family-owned SWM-NEMCO Motorsports, would set the fastest time in the session, with a lap of 49.977, and an average speed of 191.608 mph (308.363 km/h).

| Pos. | # | Driver | Team | Make | Time | Speed |
|---|---|---|---|---|---|---|
| 1 | 8 | John Hunter Nemechek (R) | SWM-NEMCO Motorsports | Chevrolet | 49.977 | 191.608 |
| 2 | 05 | John Wes Townley | Athenian Motorsports | Chevrolet | 49.978 | 191.604 |
| 3 | 17 | Timothy Peters | Red Horse Racing | Toyota | 49.998 | 191.528 |
Full first practice results

=== Final practice ===
The final practice session was held on Friday, October 23, at 2:00 PM CST, and would last for 55 minutes. Jennifer Jo Cobb, driving for her team, Jennifer Jo Cobb Racing, would set the fastest time in the session, with a lap of 52.338, and an average speed of 182.965 mph (294.454 km/h).

| Pos. | # | Driver | Team | Make | Time | Speed |
|---|---|---|---|---|---|---|
| 1 | 10 | Jennifer Jo Cobb | Jennifer Jo Cobb Racing | Chevrolet | 52.338 | 182.965 |
| 2 | 82 | Austin Hill | Empire Racing | Ford | 52.341 | 182.954 |
| 3 | 30 | Terry Jones | Rette Jones Racing | Chevrolet | 52.341 | 182.954 |
Full final practice results

== Qualifying ==
Qualifying was held on Saturday, October 24, at 9:30 AM CST. The qualifying system used is a multi car, multi lap, two round system where in the first round, everyone would set a time to determine positions 13–32. Then, the fastest 12 qualifiers would move on to the second round to determine positions 1–12.

Timothy Peters, driving for Red Horse Racing, would win the pole after advancing from the preliminary round and setting the fastest time in Round 2, with a lap of 53.706, and an average speed of 178.304 mph (286.952 km/h).

Andy Seuss and Ryan Ellis would fail to qualify.

=== Full qualifying results ===
| Pos. | # | Driver | Team | Make | Time (R1) | Speed (R1) | Time (R2) | Speed (R2) |
|---|---|---|---|---|---|---|---|---|
| 1 | 17 | Timothy Peters | Red Horse Racing | Toyota | 53.735 | 178.208 | 53.706 | 178.304 |
| 2 | 05 | John Wes Townley | Athenian Motorsports | Chevrolet | 53.888 | 177.702 | 53.778 | 178.065 |
| 3 | 4 | Erik Jones (R) | Kyle Busch Motorsports | Toyota | 54.116 | 176.953 | 53.954 | 177.485 |
| 4 | 14 | Daniel Hemric (R) | NTS Motorsports | Chevrolet | 53.977 | 177.409 | 53.997 | 177.343 |
| 5 | 11 | Ben Kennedy | Red Horse Racing | Toyota | 54.093 | 177.028 | 54.013 | 177.291 |
| 6 | 51 | Matt Tifft | Kyle Busch Motorsports | Toyota | 54.281 | 176.415 | 54.277 | 176.428 |
| 7 | 88 | Matt Crafton | ThorSport Racing | Toyota | 54.421 | 175.961 | 54.305 | 176.337 |
| 8 | 98 | Johnny Sauter | ThorSport Racing | Toyota | 54.331 | 176.253 | 54.340 | 176.224 |
| 9 | 23 | Spencer Gallagher (R) | GMS Racing | Chevrolet | 54.419 | 175.968 | 54.373 | 176.117 |
| 10 | 54 | Christopher Bell | Kyle Busch Motorsports | Toyota | 54.445 | 175.884 | 54.400 | 176.029 |
| 11 | 29 | Brian Keselowski | Brad Keselowski Racing | Ford | 54.334 | 176.243 | 54.441 | 175.897 |
| 12 | 45 | Chris Fontaine | Glenden Enterprises | Toyota | 54.649 | 175.227 | 54.913 | 174.385 |
Eliminated from Round 1
| 13 | 33 | Brandon Jones (R) | GMS Racing | Chevrolet | 54.703 | 175.054 | – | – |
| 14 | 8 | John Hunter Nemechek (R) | SWM-NEMCO Motorsports | Chevrolet | 54.753 | 174.895 | – | – |
| 15 | 19 | Tyler Reddick | Brad Keselowski Racing | Ford | 54.798 | 174.751 | – | – |
| 16 | 13 | Cameron Hayley (R) | ThorSport Racing | Toyota | 54.824 | 174.668 | – | – |
| 17 | 36 | Bobby Gerhart (i) | Bobby Gerhart Racing | Chevrolet | 55.015 | 174.062 | – | – |
| 18 | 02 | Tyler Young | Young's Motorsports | Chevrolet | 55.028 | 174.020 | – | – |
| 19 | 15 | Mason Mingus | Billy Boat Motorsports | Chevrolet | 55.137 | 173.676 | – | – |
| 20 | 16 | Chad Boat | Billy Boat Motorsports | Chevrolet | 55.166 | 173.585 | – | – |
| 21 | 91 | Stanton Barrett (i) | Stanton Barrett Motorsports | Chevrolet | 55.353 | 172.999 | – | – |
| 22 | 82 | Austin Hill | Empire Racing | Ford | 55.601 | 172.227 | – | – |
| 23 | 30 | Terry Jones | Rette Jones Racing | Chevrolet | 55.613 | 172.190 | – | – |
| 24 | 6 | Norm Benning | Norm Benning Racing | Chevrolet | 55.712 | 171.884 | – | – |
| 25 | 94 | Timmy Hill | Premium Motorsports | Chevrolet | 55.783 | 171.665 | – | – |
| 26 | 68 | Clay Greenfield | Clay Greenfield Motorsports | Chevrolet | 55.807 | 171.591 | – | – |
| 27 | 07 | Ray Black Jr. (R) | SS-Green Light Racing | Chevrolet | 55.898 | 171.312 | – | – |
Qualified by owner's points
| 28 | 63 | Tyler Tanner | MB Motorsports | Chevrolet | 56.002 | 170.994 | – | – |
| 29 | 10 | Jennifer Jo Cobb | Jennifer Jo Cobb Racing | Chevrolet | 56.226 | 170.313 | – | – |
| 30 | 08 | Korbin Forrister (R) | BJMM with SS-Green Light Racing | Chevrolet | 56.767 | 168.690 | – | – |
| 31 | 1 | Travis Kvapil | MAKE Motorsports | Chevrolet | 56.931 | 168.204 | – | – |
| 32 | 74 | Jordan Anderson | Mike Harmon Racing | Chevrolet | 57.318 | 167.068 | – | – |
Failed to qualify
| 33 | 28 | Andy Seuss | FDNY Racing | Chevrolet | 56.048 | 170.854 | – | – |
| 34 | 50 | Ryan Ellis | MAKE Motorsports | Chevrolet | 57.609 | 166.224 | – | – |
Official starting lineup

== Race results ==
| Fin | St | # | Driver | Team | Make | Laps | Led | Status | Pts | Winnings |
|---|---|---|---|---|---|---|---|---|---|---|
| 1 | 1 | 17 | Timothy Peters | Red Horse Racing | Toyota | 98 | 23 | Running | 47 | $67,978 |
| 2 | 13 | 33 | Brandon Jones (R) | GMS Racing | Chevrolet | 98 | 7 | Running | 43 | $48,318 |
| 3 | 19 | 15 | Mason Mingus | Billy Boat Motorsports | Chevrolet | 98 | 0 | Running | 41 | $36,014 |
| 4 | 3 | 4 | Erik Jones (R) | Kyle Busch Motorsports | Toyota | 98 | 6 | Running | 41 | $27,203 |
| 5 | 15 | 19 | Tyler Reddick | Brad Keselowski Racing | Ford | 98 | 0 | Running | 39 | $20,861 |
| 6 | 16 | 13 | Cameron Hayley (R) | ThorSport Racing | Toyota | 98 | 0 | Running | 38 | $20,056 |
| 7 | 8 | 98 | Johnny Sauter | ThorSport Racing | Toyota | 98 | 0 | Running | 37 | $19,470 |
| 8 | 12 | 45 | Chris Fontaine | Glenden Enterprises | Toyota | 98 | 0 | Running | 36 | $18,939 |
| 9 | 20 | 16 | Chad Boat | Billy Boat Motorsports | Chevrolet | 98 | 0 | Running | 35 | $16,579 |
| 10 | 18 | 02 | Tyler Young | Young's Motorsports | Chevrolet | 98 | 0 | Running | 34 | $19,675 |
| 11 | 14 | 8 | John Hunter Nemechek (R) | SWM-NEMCO Motorsports | Chevrolet | 98 | 0 | Running | 33 | $18,616 |
| 12 | 17 | 36 | Bobby Gerhart (i) | Bobby Gerhart Racing | Chevrolet | 98 | 0 | Running | 0 | $18,428 |
| 13 | 10 | 54 | Christopher Bell | Kyle Busch Motorsports | Toyota | 98 | 0 | Running | 31 | $18,318 |
| 14 | 27 | 07 | Ray Black Jr. (R) | SS-Green Light Racing | Chevrolet | 98 | 1 | Running | 31 | $18,214 |
| 15 | 30 | 08 | Korbin Forrister (R) | BJMM with SS-Green Light Racing | Chevrolet | 98 | 0 | Running | 29 | $18,705 |
| 16 | 2 | 05 | John Wes Townley | Athenian Motorsports | Chevrolet | 98 | 1 | Running | 29 | $18,000 |
| 17 | 11 | 29 | Brian Keselowski | Brad Keselowski Racing | Ford | 98 | 10 | Running | 28 | $17,891 |
| 18 | 9 | 23 | Spencer Gallagher (R) | GMS Racing | Chevrolet | 98 | 0 | Running | 26 | $17,787 |
| 19 | 32 | 74 | Jordan Anderson | Mike Harmon Racing | Chevrolet | 97 | 0 | Running | 25 | $17,655 |
| 20 | 25 | 94 | Timmy Hill | Premium Motorsports | Chevrolet | 97 | 1 | Running | 25 | $16,796 |
| 21 | 24 | 6 | Norm Benning | Norm Benning Racing | Chevrolet | 96 | 0 | Running | 23 | $16,192 |
| 22 | 22 | 82 | Austin Hill | Empire Racing | Ford | 96 | 0 | Running | 22 | $15,082 |
| 23 | 6 | 51 | Matt Tifft | Kyle Busch Motorsports | Toyota | 96 | 0 | Running | 21 | $14,979 |
| 24 | 7 | 88 | Matt Crafton | ThorSport Racing | Toyota | 96 | 43 | Running | 22 | $15,869 |
| 25 | 5 | 11 | Ben Kennedy | Red Horse Racing | Toyota | 96 | 6 | Running | 20 | $14,909 |
| 26 | 28 | 63 | Tyler Tanner | MB Motorsports | Chevrolet | 91 | 0 | Accident | 18 | $14,655 |
| 27 | 31 | 1 | Travis Kvapil | MAKE Motorsports | Chevrolet | 91 | 0 | Accident | 17 | $14,551 |
| 28 | 4 | 14 | Daniel Hemric (R) | NTS Motorsports | Chevrolet | 91 | 0 | Running | 16 | $14,215 |
| 29 | 21 | 91 | Stanton Barrett (i) | Stanton Barrett Motorsports | Chevrolet | 85 | 0 | Accident | 0 | $14,106 |
| 30 | 26 | 68 | Clay Greenfield | Clay Greenfield Motorsports | Chevrolet | 77 | 0 | Overheating | 14 | $13,606 |
| 31 | 23 | 30 | Terry Jones | Rette Jones Racing | Chevrolet | 35 | 0 | Accident | 13 | $12,106 |
| 32 | 29 | 10 | Jennifer Jo Cobb | Jennifer Jo Cobb Racing | Chevrolet | 29 | 0 | Engine | 12 | $11,106 |
Official race results

== Standings after the race ==
Drivers' Championship standings

| | Pos | Driver | Points |
|---|---|---|---|
| | 1 | Erik Jones | 742 |
| 1 | 2 | Tyler Reddick | 724 (-18) |
| 1 | 3 | Matt Crafton | 719 (–23) |
| | 4 | Johnny Sauter | 687 (–55) |
| 1 | 5 | Timothy Peters | 642 (–100) |
| 1 | 6 | Cameron Hayley | 622 (–120) |
| 2 | 7 | Daniel Hemric | 612 (–130) |
| | 8 | John Wes Townley | 594 (–148) |
| | 9 | Ben Kennedy | 565 (–177) |
| | 10 | Spencer Gallagher | 559 (–183) |
Official driver's standings

- Note: Only the first 10 positions are included for the driver standings.

| Previous race: 2015 Rhino Linings 350 | NASCAR Camping World Truck Series; 2015 season | Next race: 2015 Kroger 200 |
