= Karen Hudson-Edwards =

Canadian mineralogist & geochemist

- Born: Canada
- Education: Queen's University at Kingston; Memorial University of Newfoundland; University of Manchester
- Scientific career
- Fields: Geology
- Workplaces: Professor of Environmental Geochemistry and Mineralogy at Birkbeck University of London (1998-2017); Professor in Sustainable Mining for Camborne School of Mines and University of Exeter (2017-Current)

Karen A. Hudson-Edwards is a Canadian mineralogist and geochemist. She is a professor at the University of Exeter, where she specializes in sustainable mining jointly between the Camborne School of Mines and the Environment and Sustainability Institute (University of Exeter). Specifically, she has delved into research on contaminant cycling, remediation strategies for mining waste, surface and ground water, sustainable mining practices, and the circular economy in mining.

== Education ==
Born in Canada, Hudson-Edwards studied Geology at Queen's University at Kingston in 1981. She graduated in 1985, attaining her BSc in the Department of Geological Sciences. Edwards then went onto receive her MSc in Earth Science at Memorial University of Newfoundland from 1985 to 1988. From 1993 until 1996, Karen Hudson-Edwards achieved her PhD from the University of Manchester in the study of Environmental Mineralogy and Geochemistry.

Before her receiving her PhD, Edwards worked as geologist for the Geological Survey of Canada until 1989, before operating as an Exploration Geologist for Falconbridge Ltd. from the same year up to 1992.

Post-PhD, Hudson-Edwards assisted temporarily as a Postdoctoral Research Fellow for the School of Geography, at the University of Leeds.

== Career ==
She has worked in the Department of Earth and Planetary Sciences at Birkbeck University of London for almost 20 years, before joining the Environment and Sustainability Institute and Camborne School of Mines in October 2017. Her research focuses on the environmental impact of mine wastes, including understanding their character, stability, impact, remediation, and reuse. In her research she looked into specific examples such as Fundão and Santarém mine tailings dam failure in Minas Gerais, Brazil, on November 5, 2015, and how it showed the world the results of unsustainable mining.

She also has conducted detailed mineralogical and geochemical studies on the effects of mining on river sediments, particularly in the Rio Tinto and Rio Pilcomayo regions between 1999-2001.

In 2019 she was invited to be the European Association of Geochemistry Distinguished Lecturer for 2019. Hudson-Edwards has authored more than 120 scientific articles and has an h-index of 49.

She was recognized by the '100 Global Inspirational Women in Mining' publication in 2022 as one of the most inspirational women in mining worldwide.

In addition to her research, she advises the Eden Project with their Living Worlds Exhibit which was on display until 2023. Furthermore, Hudson-Edwards is advising the law commission on their consultation on Regulating Coal Tip Safety in Wales. She is a member of the editorial board of the peer-reviewed publication called the Journal of Geochemical Exploration and Mineralogical Magazine, and associate editor for Frontiers in Earth Sciences, and Geoscience and Society. In addition, she currently holds the position of publications manager for the Mineralogical Society of Great Britain and Ireland.

Recently she has been contributing, and working with fellow researchers in natural carbon mineralization. Specifically, delving into the influence on the Geochemical Evolution of Coal-Based Aquifers in the Salt Ranges, in Punjab and Pakistan.

== Research and contributions ==
Research Projects Hudson-Edwards Has Contributed To
Name of Project and Official Website	Year	Brief Description
NEMO: Near-zero-waste recycling of low-grade sulphidic mining waste for critical-metal, mineral and construction raw-material production in a circular economy	May 2018 - Nov 2022	The NEMO Project aims to eliminate excessive waste in mining projects, discovering new methods in recycling sulphidic mining waste.
Legacy Waste in the Coastal Zone: Environmental Risks and Management Futures	Jan 2020 - Dec 2023	Investigates the biogeochemical aspects in legacy waste along the coastal zones, assessing the impact of its effects and developing strategies in future management of the waste.
Lithium for Future Technology (LiFT)	Nov 2020 - Nov 2024	LiFT dives into the understanding of the lithium cycle and ways in which lithium is deposited, bringing forth a multitude of possibilities in searching sustainable and new Li resources.
UKRI Interdisciplinary Circular Economy Centre for Technology Metals (Met4Tech)	Jan 2021 - Dec 2024	Met4Tech, structured on the collaboration of various research teams based in the UK, dedicates itself in its improvement of raw materials and technology metals, ensuring efficient manufacturing and the recycling of metal goods such as batteries.
PAMANA: Philippine Mining at the National to Catchment Scale	Oct 2021 - May 2025	Project PAMANA aims to preserve legacy and future mining opportunities to take place in the Philippines, a mineral-rich country, through embedding catchment in monitoring and managing sustainable mining.
Bioprocessing of Lithium Brines (BBSRC)	Feb 2023 - May 2025	BBSRC closely observes and investigates the usage of biotechnology in recovering lithium found in geothermal brines, as well as how biotechnology can be served as a means in the circular economy.

NEMO Project Website
- Website: https://h2020-nemo.eu/project-2/

Legacy Waste in the Coastal Zone
- Website: https://research.ncl.ac.uk/legacywastes/

Project PAMANA
- Website: https://projectpamana.org/

Met4Tech
- Website: https://met4tech.org/about/
