= AccessAir =

Low-cost airline of the United States (1998–2001)

Access Air
IATA	ICAO	Call sign
ZA	CYD	CYCLONE
- Founded: 1998
- Commenced operations: February 1999
- Ceased operations: February 2001
- Hubs: Des Moines International Airport
- Fleet size: 4
- Headquarters: Des Moines, Iowa

Access Air was a short-lived low-cost airline based in Des Moines, Iowa, United States.

== History ==
AccessAir was founded in 1998 and, after multiple delays, began operating flights in February 1999. Looking to provide lower rates at niche markets such as Des Moines, the Quad Cities, and Peoria, major investors at its start included many local companies, such as Caterpillar Inc. (Peoria) and FBL Financial Group, Principal Financial Group, MidAmerican Energy, and Pioneer Hi-Bred (Des Moines). Flights would fly from Des Moines to New York–LaGuardia via either the Quad Cities or Peoria. Direct service to Los Angeles was added later; Colorado Springs was later added as a stop.

Despite offering discounted rates below major carriers, AccessAir struggled to fill planes, with most planes not even half full. The airline filed for Chapter 11 bankruptcy in November 1999, after just nine months of operations. A total of 14,000 enplanements resulted in an estimated $30 million in losses. Des Moines business leader John Ruan III came forward in the spring of 2000 and injected the money necessary to take control of the company and restart operations. The airline resumed flights in November 2000 with daily flights from Des Moines to Chicago Midway Airport with the intent of offering flights to Phoenix, Los Angeles, and Cedar Rapids. However, low passenger loads again led to the airline shutting down in February 2001.

== Destinations ==
AccessAir provided service to cities such as Los Angeles (via LAX) and New York City (via LaGuardia Airport) from its hub in Des Moines, Iowa from 1998 to 2001. Other cities included Colorado Springs, Colorado; Peoria, Illinois; and Moline, Illinois. Access was a point-to-point carrier, meaning flights did not always start or stop in its hub city of Des Moines. Access Air utilized a series of thru-flights to connect its route network. For example, if a passenger wanted to fly Access Air from New York to Los Angeles, they would have to first fly through one or two stops, i.e. Peoria, Moline, Des Moines, and Colorado Springs before reaching Los Angeles. In most cases, it would be a quick 25-minute turn-around for fuel and a few passengers before continuing to the next destination.

AccessAir flew (or had planned to fly) to the following domestic destinations:

- California
  - Los Angeles – Los Angeles International Airport
  - San Francisco – San Francisco International Airport
- Colorado
  - Colorado Springs – City of Colorado Springs Municipal Airport
- Florida
  - Miami – Miami International Airport
- Georgia
  - Atlanta – Hartsfield–Jackson Atlanta International Airport
- Illinois
  - Chicago – Chicago Midway International Airport
  - Moline/Quad Cities – Quad Cities International Airport
  - Peoria – General Wayne A. Downing Peoria International Airport
- Iowa
  - Des Moines – Des Moines International Airport (Hub)
- Massachusetts
  - Boston – Boston Logan International Airport
- New York
  - New York City – LaGuardia Airport
- Oregon
  - Portland – Portland International Airport
- Washington
  - Seattle/Tacoma – Seattle–Tacoma International Airport

== Fleet ==
The airline operated Boeing 737-200 jetliners.

The airline's logo was a stylized capital A with a circle around it, similar to "@". The aircraft was bare metal with a red stripe along the window line which continued to the rudder (but not the rest of the vertical stabilizer). There was also a black stripe under the red one on the fuselage.

The airline's fleet included four 737s registered in the US as N621AC, N623AC, N624AC and N625AC. N621AC and N623AC originally flew under German registration for Lufthansa. After Access Air service, N623AC operated as PK-JGR in Indonesia for Jatayu Airlines.

== See also ==
- List of defunct airlines of the United States
