= Quad Cities International Airport =

Airport in Moline, Illinois, United States

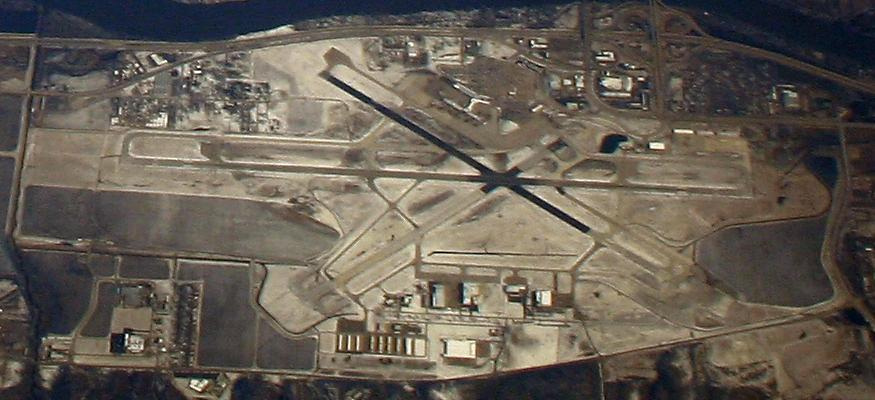
- IATA: MLI; ICAO: KMLI; FAA LID: MLI; WMO: 72544

Summary
- Airport type: Public
- Owner: Rock Island County
- Operator: Metropolitan Airport Authority of Rock Island County
- Serves: Quad Cities, Eastern Iowa, Western Illinois
- Location: Moline, IL
- Elevation AMSL: 590 ft (180 m)
- Coordinates: 41°26′55″N 90°30′27″W
- Public transit access: Quad Cities MetroLINK
- Website: qcairport.com

Maps
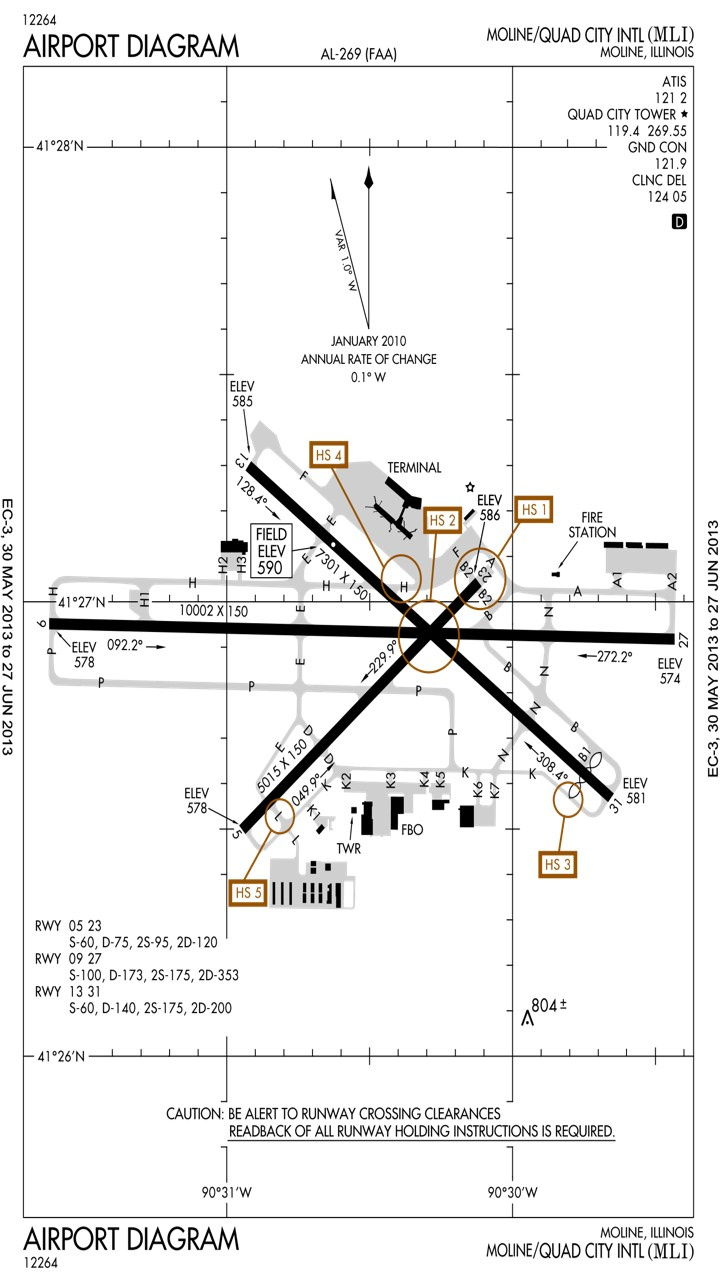
- FAA airport diagram
- Interactive map of Quad Cities International Airport

Runways
Direction	Length		Surface
Direction	ft	m	Surface
9/27	10,002	3,049	Concrete
13/31	7,301	2,134	Asphalt
5/23	3,514	1,071	Concrete

Statistics (2023)
- Total Passengers: 537,000
- Aircraft operations: 43,366
- Based aircraft (2021): 85
- Source: FAA

Quad Cities International Airport (IATA: MLI, ICAO: KMLI, FAA LID: MLI) is a public airport in Rock Island County, Illinois, three miles (5 km) south of Moline, partly in Blackhawk Township and partly in Coal Valley Township. In 2012 it was named "Illinois Primary Airport of the Year". It serves the Quad Cities Metropolitan area, including Davenport and Bettendorf in Scott County, Iowa as well as Moline in Rock Island County, Illinois.

The airport does not have any international commercial passenger flights; its international designation is due to being an official port of entry and having a Foreign Trade Zone and U.S. Customs Office, enabling international cargo shipments and international general aviation passenger flights.

The airport is directly south of the Quad-City Seaplane Base, which is located on the Rock River, Quad Cities International's northern boundary.

== History ==
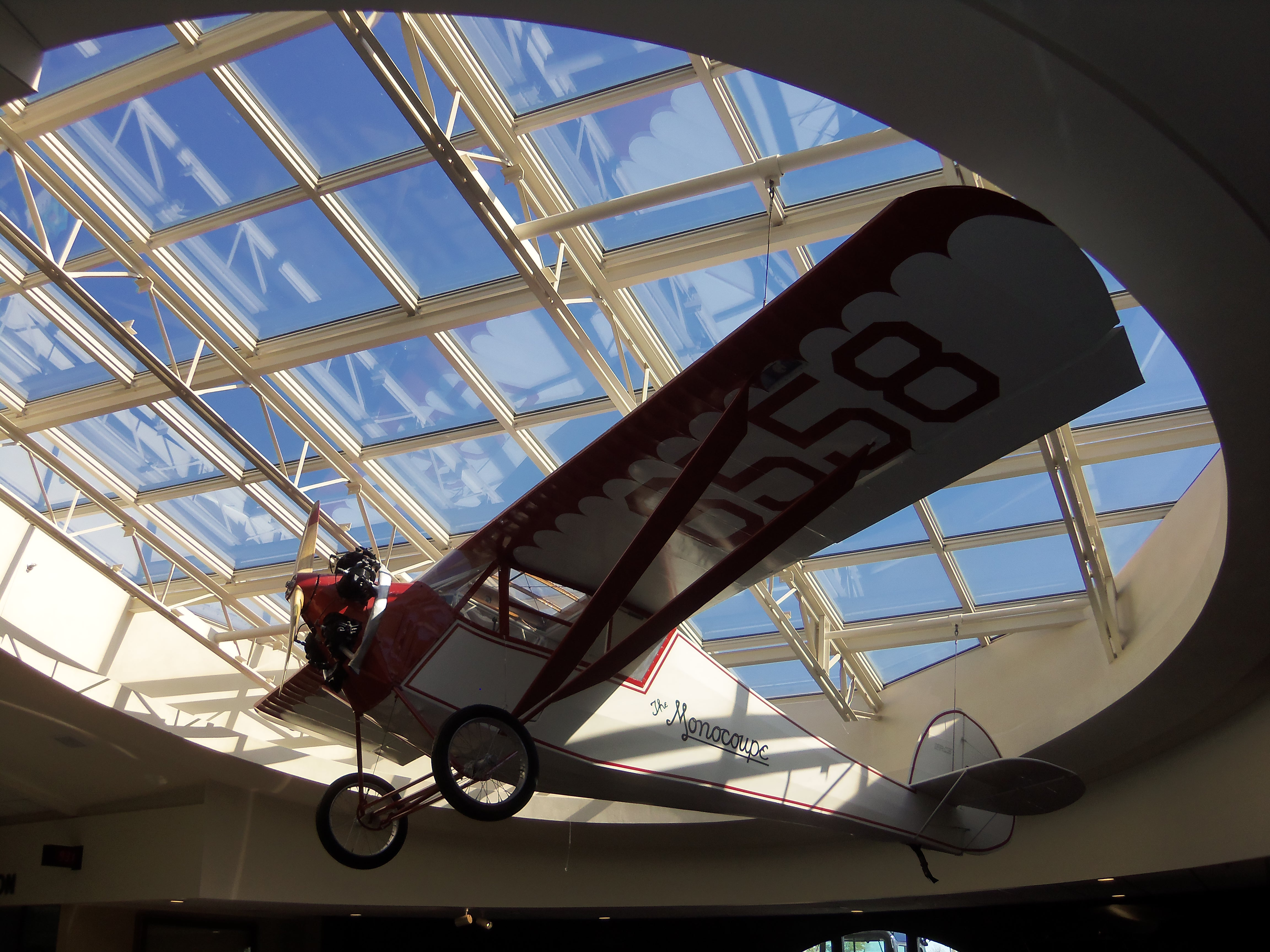
A Velie Monocoupe airplane in the terminal

Franing Field, the site of the present Quad Cities International Airport, was picked as an ideal flying field, with 120 acres (49 ha) of level, grassy land free of obstacles. The airport made headlines right at the start, chosen as a control point for the first coast-to-coast flight in the fall of 1919. On August 18, 1927, an estimated 10,000 people came to welcome Charles Lindbergh in Moline and his famous plane, the Spirit of St. Louis, on the Gugenheim tour, a cross-country commercial aviation promotion tour. In 1929, Phoebe Omlie set an altitude record above the airport in a Velie Monocoupe, the only plane ever manufactured in Moline, which still hangs in the passenger terminal.

In 1947, the Metropolitan Airport Authority of Rock Island County was formed after seven townships voted to establish it.

In 1957, the first count of enplaning and deplaning passengers was made, with a total of 59,701 recorded.

The airport underwent major remodeling in 1961 and 1968, adding everything from baggage claim to a restaurant and boarding areas.

The present airport terminal was completed in 1985 after studies showed that an addition to the 1954 structure would be more costly than an entirely new terminal. The shift to the new $11 million terminal allowed expansion of airline facilities; between 1979 and 1986, the number of airlines increased from two to seven.

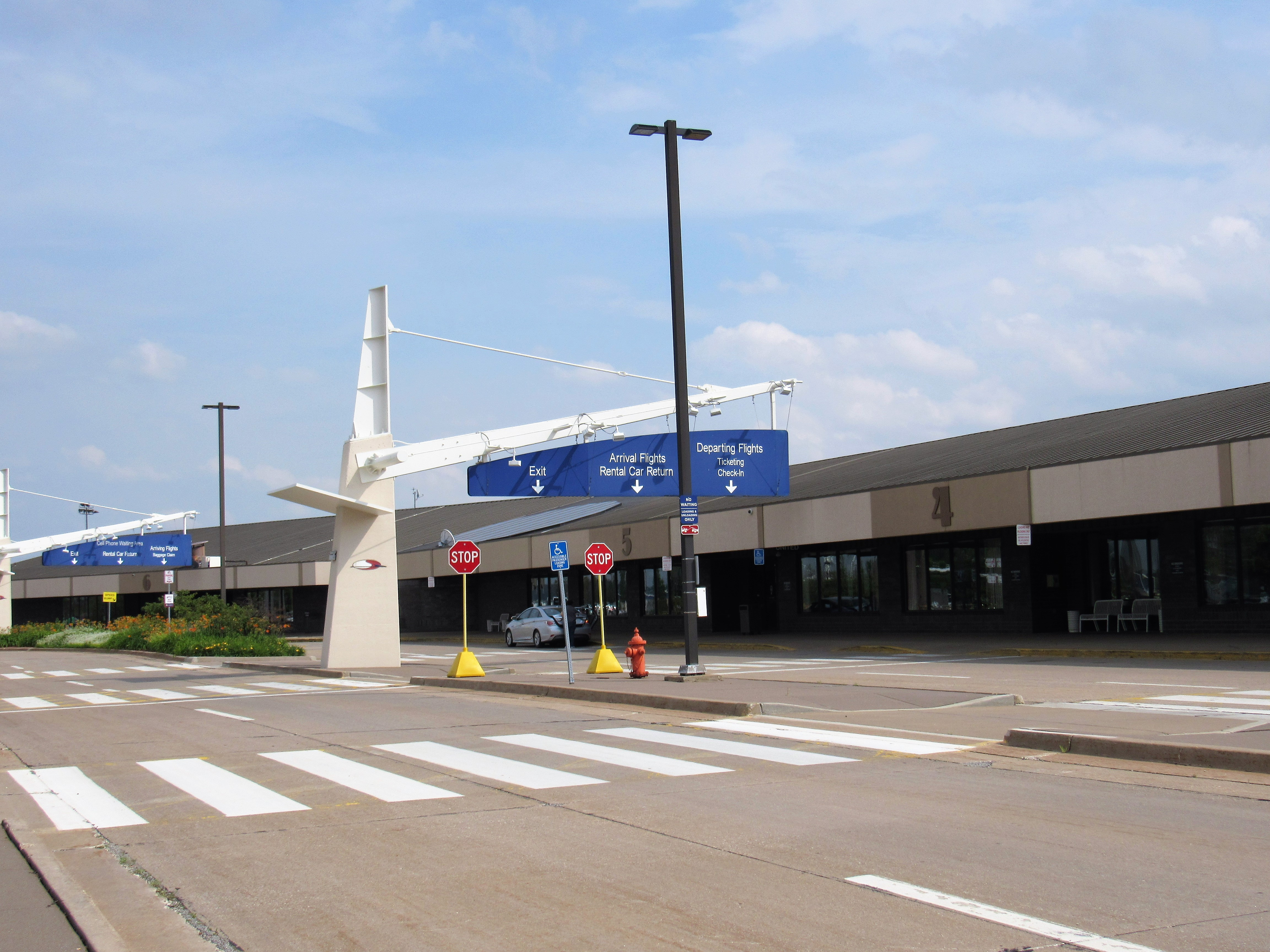
Terminal

AccessAir, Air Midwest, AirTran Airways, America West Airlines, American Airlines, Allegiant Air, Chicago Air, Midway Connection, Northwest Airlines, Ozark Air Lines, Pan American World Airways, Skyway Airlines, Trans World Airlines, United Airlines, SkyWest Airlines, and Sun Country Airlines have flown to Quad Cities. At one time Mississippi Valley Airlines had its headquarters at the airport. In the early and mid-1990s turboprop equipment was common; Northwest Airlink and other airlines had Saab 340Bs. Carriers have replaced their turboprops with newer regional jets. Allegiant Air Airbus A319s and Airbus A320s fly to Orlando, Las Vegas, Clearwater, and Phoenix/Mesa.

None of the current legacy carriers fly mainline jets from Moline; the most recent mainline service was Delta Air Lines A319s and A320s to Atlanta in 2013. Until 2002–03, American Airlines MD-80s flew to Saint Louis after its acquisition of TWA in the early 2000s; TWA succeeded Ozark, which started flying to Moline in 1950. (Moline's first jets were Ozark DC-9s in 1966.)

United Boeing 727s and 737s flew non-stop to Denver until 1995; United flights to Moline began in the 1930s. Republic DC-9s flew to both Detroit and Minneapolis starting in 1986; successor Northwest pulled out in 1989. America West 737s flew to Phoenix in 1987–92, and Braniff served Moline from the 1940s until 1959.

In 2001, the terminal underwent a major renovation and expansion: two new concourses, a larger baggage claim area, new restaurants, and gift shops. The project doubled the size of the terminal. The Philadelphia architectural firm DPK&A designed the new concourses.

A larger U.S. Customs and Border Protection Facility was opened in 2014 in a former air cargo building. The facility processes international passengers arriving on general aviation flights. No airlines use this facility. It has a processing room, an interview room, space for agricultural inspections, office space, and holding cells for passengers who are prohibited from entering the U.S. or who are being detained and transported by law enforcement. Phase two of the project will renovate the remainder of the building to create an international terminal or Federal Inspection Service should the airport establish nonstop international charter flights. Gere-Dismer Architects of Rock Island designed the facility.

On March 30, 2021, the airport announced another major renovation at a cost of $20-$40 million. This renovation will update and expand the ticketing area, which was last updated in 1985. Other changes include a wider TSA screening area, an indoor/outdoor garden and observation deck with water feature, modern seating and power sources throughout the airport, and exterior solar panels above covered parking. The announcement coincided with a renaming of the airport from Quad City International Airport to Quad Cities International Airport along with a new logo. The architectural firm Alliiance, of Minneapolis, designed the renovations.

The airport received funding for this renovation in part from the 2021 Infrastructure Investment and Jobs Act. Upgrades are set to begin in 2023.

The airport set its passenger record in 2007 when 484,212 passengers boarded flights while 481,930 deplaned, for a total of 966,142. The total beat the record of 911,522 set the previous year. In 2008 passenger numbers declined: 957,087 passengers enplaned or deplaned. Passenger count dropped to 763,416 in 2013.

== Facilities ==
Quad Cities International Airport covers 2,021 acres (818 hectares) and has three runways:

- 9/27: 10,002 ft × 150 ft (3,049 m × 46 m), concrete, ILS
- 13/31: 7,301 ft × 150 ft (2,225 m × 46 m), asphalt/concrete
- 5/23: 3,514 ft × 150 ft (1,071 m × 46 m), concrete

Quad Cities International Airport can accommodate any aircraft in almost any weather with the long runways, ILS, and high-intensity lighting. Airport officials claim that the airport is possibly capable of handling the Airbus A380. The airfield has had many changes over the past few years, including extending taxiway H.

Runway 9/27, the longest runway, was rebuilt in 2011. The program included a temporary 6,500-foot (2,000 m) parallel runway (10/28), now taxiway P. The new runway 9/27 has new pavement, new shoulder construction, taxiway additions, and a new glide-slope capture effect kit for runway 9. It cost $34 million and was completed in late 2012 when the temporary runway became a taxiway.

In 2022, the airport began a reconstruction process to alter the layout of its airport. The plan would shorten runway 5/23 by 1500 feet and add a new taxiway parallel to runway 9/27, the airport's main commercial runway. The $10 million project is funded entirely by the FAA.

The airport's first air traffic control Tower was on top of the old (1954-era) passenger terminal. The present tower, on the south side of the airport near fixed-base operator Elliot Aviation, is staffed seven days a week from 5:30 a.m. to 10:30 p.m. At other times control of airspace is by the Chicago Air Traffic Center remoted from Aurora.

The airport is designated international for having a port of entry customs service. A Foreign Trade Zone and U.S. Customs Office are located at the airport, enabling international inbound and outbound shipments. The Customs & Border Protection offices recently opened in the easternmost former cargo building. There are three cargo facilities for every available ramp and the airport has expansion capabilities. A number of air freight companies are located at the airport including BAX Global, DHL, and UPS Supply Chain Solutions.

Fixed-base operators (FBOs) on the airport include Elliott Aviation and QCIA Airport Services.

In 2021 the airport had 28,181 aircraft operations, average 77 per day: 61% general aviation, 21% air taxi, 14% airline and 3% military. In December 2021, 85 aircraft were based at the airport: 55 single-engine, 18 multi-engine, 11 jet and 1 helicopter.

== Services ==
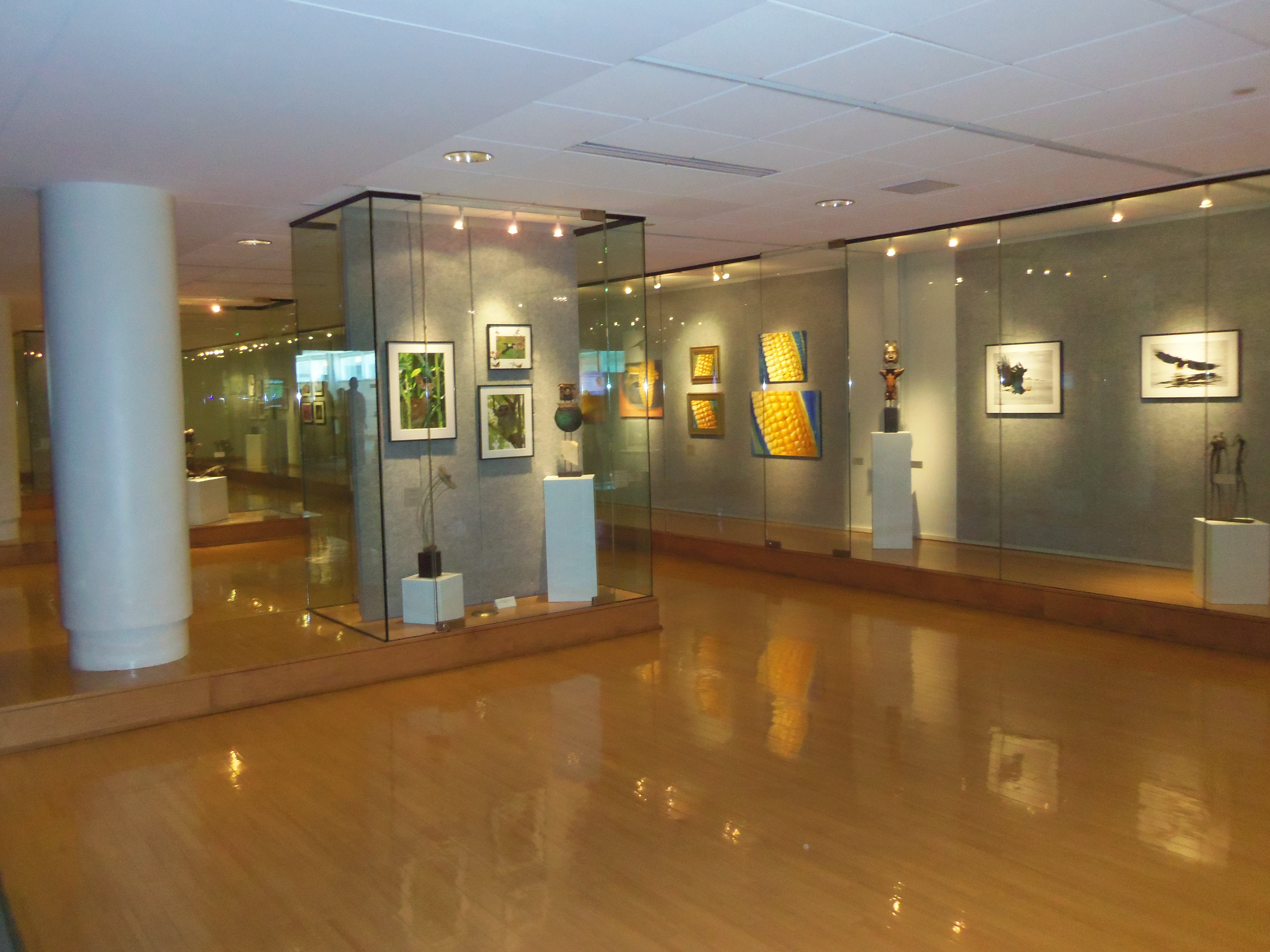
Art gallery

The terminal features the full-service Air Host Restaurant. There are also a full-service bar, Paradies Gift Shop, shoe shine service, post office boxes, and a mail drop. An art gallery, featuring local and regional modern and contemporary art, is located near the security check point. There is a visitor information center near baggage claim to provide passengers local tourism information and directions. Free internet access via Wi-Fi is available throughout the airport.

Beyond the security checkpoint in between Concourses A & B, there is a snack bar, lounge, bar, and a Gevalia Kaffe Coffee Shop. Located on Concourse B is a CNBC News and Gift Shop. Destination Points, a frequent flyer lounge, is available for local and regional travelers who fly approximately eight or more times, annually. There are also several work stations that passengers may utilize to set out their computers or work, and recharge their electronics.

There are two hotels on the airport property across the parking lot from the terminal. A three-story Hampton Inn & Suites opened in 2006 and a four-story Holiday Inn Express in 2014. In an effort to decrease the number of people circling the airport proper waiting to pick up arriving passengers a cell phone waiting area was created in 2008 adjacent to the airport's entrance road. A consolidated rental car facility opened in October, 2014. The airport has a TSA office, serving administrative functions for Downstate IL airports, on the second floor of the terminal.

== Airlines and destinations ==
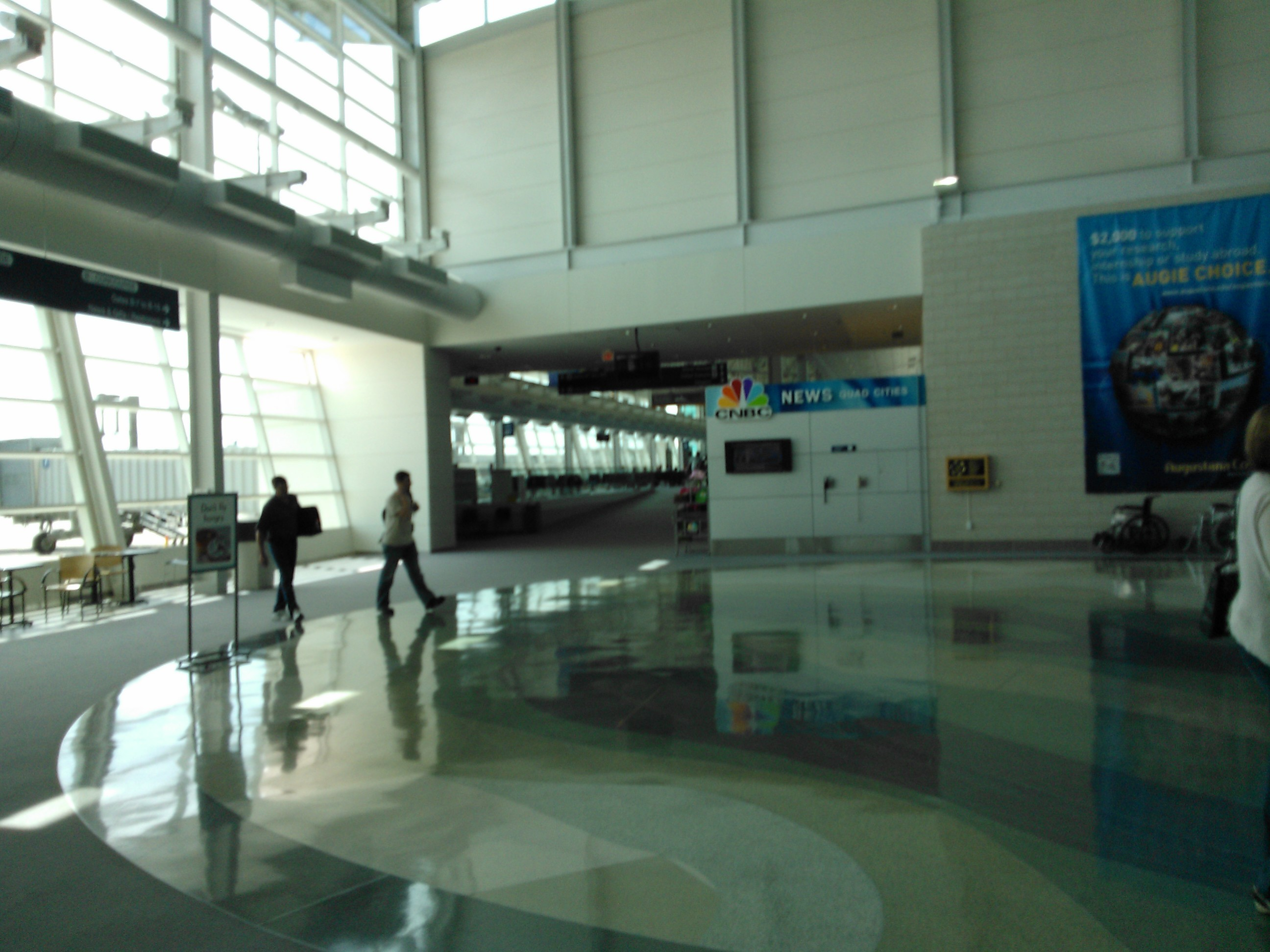
Atrium between the concourses

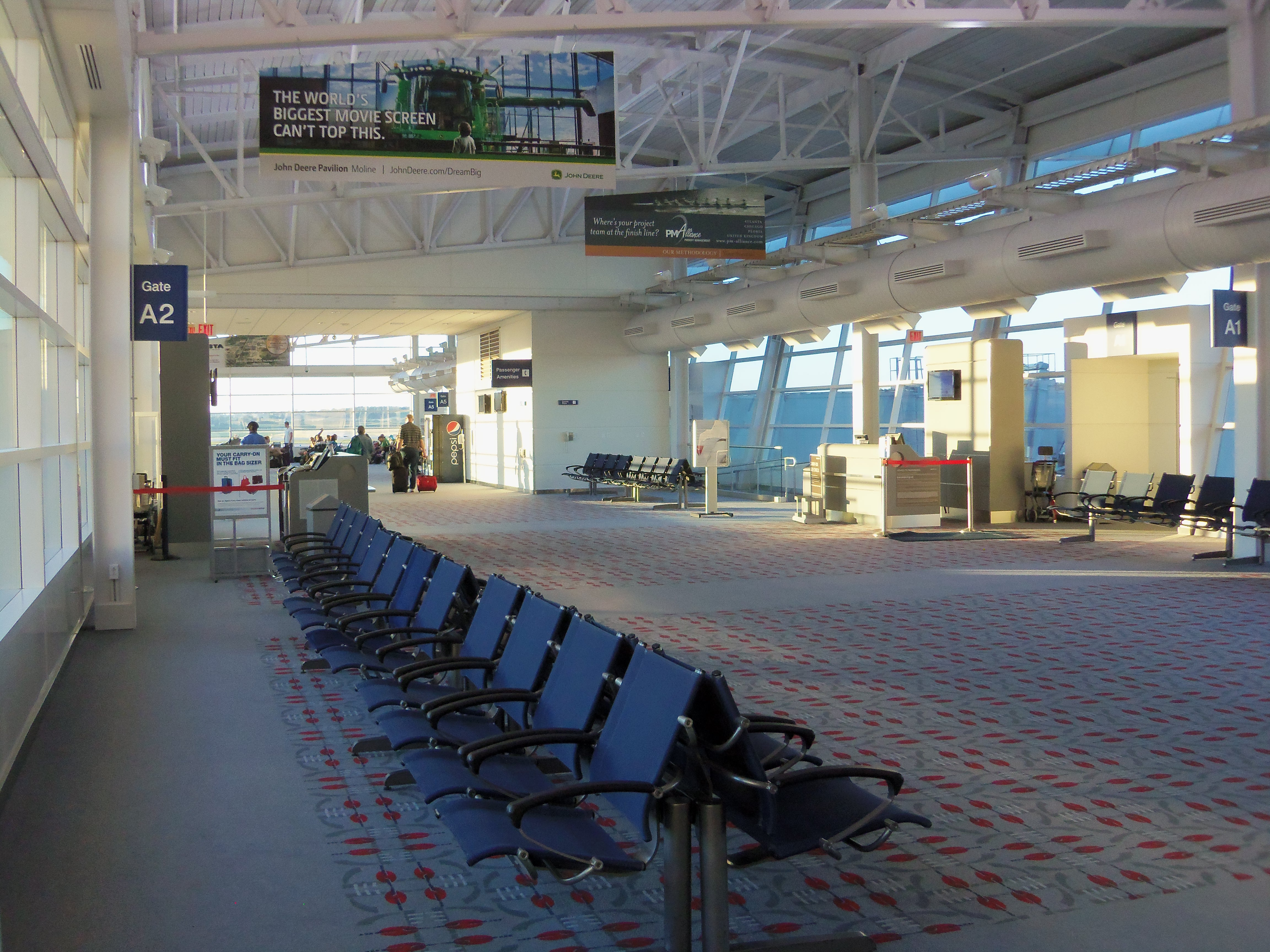
A Concourse

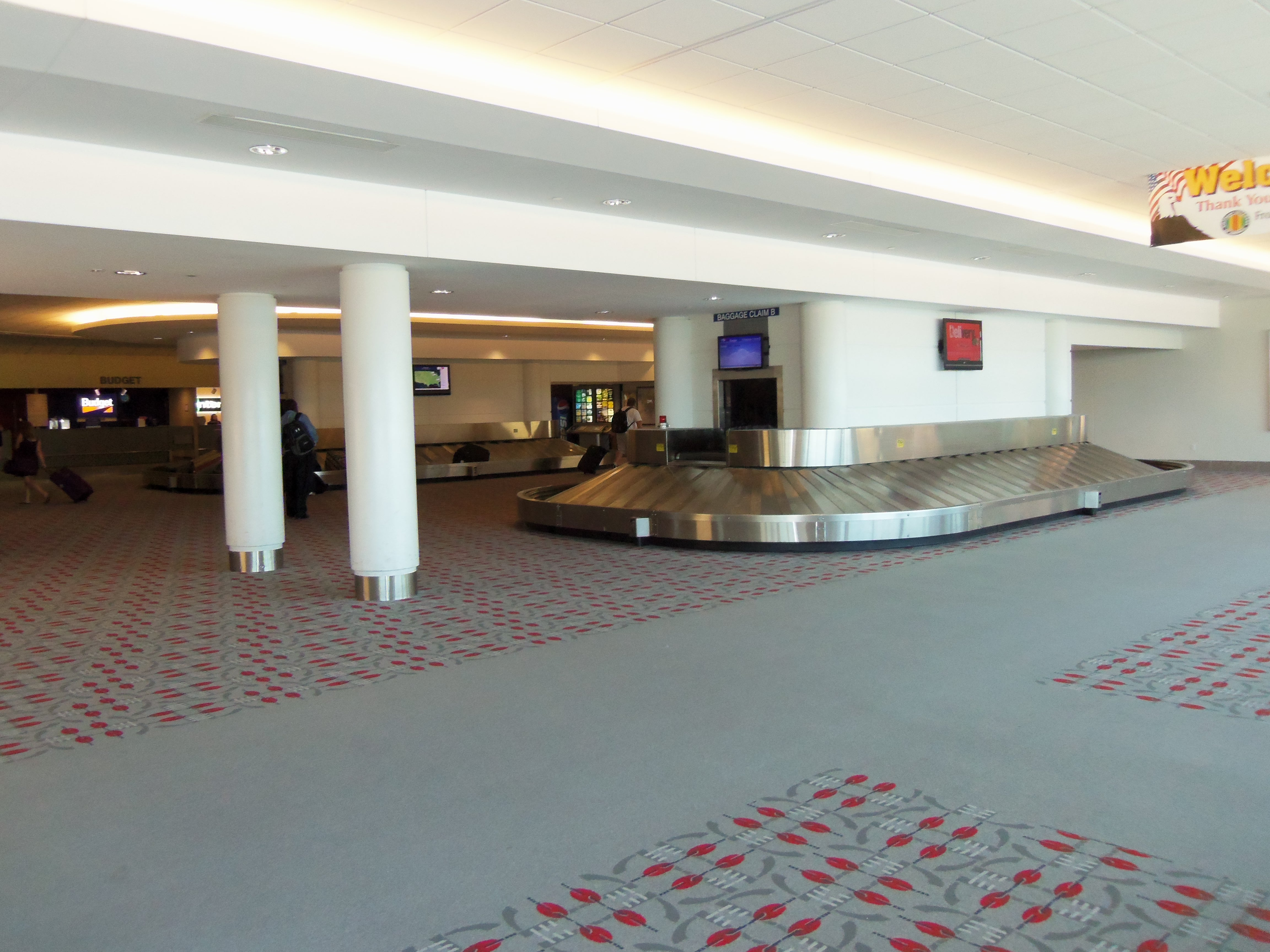
Baggage claim

Airlines	Destinations	Refs
Allegiant Air	Las Vegas, Sarasota; Seasonal: Orlando/Sanford, Phoenix/Mesa, Punta Gorda (FL), St. Petersburg/Clearwater	
American Eagle	Charlotte, Chicago–O'Hare, Dallas/Fort Worth	
Delta Connection	Atlanta	
United Express	Chicago–O'Hare, Denver	

Destinations map
Destinations from Quad Cities International Airport

• Red represents year-round destinations.
• Green represents seasonal destinations.

• Blue represents future destinations.

== Statistics ==
Busiest domestic routes out of MLI (March 2025 – February 2026)
Rank	Airport	Passengers	Carriers
1	Chicago-O'Hare, Illinois	109,180	American, United
2	Dallas/Fort Worth, Texas	55,190	American
3	(Georgia (U.S. state)) Atlanta, Georgia	43,280	Delta
4	Charlotte, North Carolina	35,280	American
5	Denver, Colorado	23,800	United
6	Las Vegas, Nevada	14,820	Allegiant
7	Orlando/Sanford, Florida	14,640	Allegiant
8	Phoenix/Mesa, Arizona	14,330	Allegiant
9	Punta Gorda, Florida	14,170	Allegiant
10	St. Petersburg/Clearwater, Florida	12,740	Allegiant

Carrier shares for (March 2025 – February 2026)
Carrier	Passengers (arriving and departing)
SkyWest	168,000(24.81%)
Allegiant	145,000(21.53%)
Envoy Air	137,000(20.25%)
Endeavor	86,560(12.82%)
PSA	77,180(11.43%)
Other	61,740(9.15%)

== Ground transportation ==
Public transit service to the airport is provided by Quad Cities MetroLINK. Route 20 operates daily from downtown Moline to the airport.

== See also ==
- List of airports in Illinois
- Moline station
