= Aventine =

Aventine may refer to:

- Aventine (album), album by Danish singer-songwriter Agnes Obel.
  - "Aventine" (song), title track from album above

== See also ==
- Aventine Hall, historic home located at Luray, Page County, Virginia
- Aventine Hill, one of the seven hills on which ancient Rome was built
- Aventine Renewable Energy, bioethanol and biodiesel company based in Pekin, Illinois
- Aventine Secession (494 BC)
- Aventine Secession (20th century)
- Aventine Triad, modern term for the joint cult of the Roman deities Ceres, Liber and Libera
- Mount Aventine, farm complex and national historic district located along the Potomac River in Bryans Road, Charles County, Maryland.
- Santa Sabina, or Basilica of Saint Sabina, historical church on the Aventine Hill in Rome, Italy
