= Shakespeare Squared =

Shakespeare Squared was a content development company in the United States. The company created print and digital products for educational and trade book publishers. Their work included standards-based writing and editing for preK-12 textbooks and workbooks, specialized assessment and test preparation materials, translations, and online content development.

Company logo

The company's office was in Northbrook, IL. In addition to a small in-house staff, the company utilized a network of more than 2000 freelance editors, writers, and other contributors.

The business is now closed.

== History ==
Shakespeare Squared was co-founded in 2003 by Kim and Jay Kleeman. High school teachers themselves, the Kleemans decided to join their expertise in language and literature and math and science to offer comprehensive development services across all disciplines and media. While Jay stayed in the classroom, Kim served as the company's president and CEO.

== Divisions ==
While Shakespeare Squared had its roots in the educational publishing industry, the company expanded its services in 2008 with the launch of its digital media division, S2EO. S2EO provided content for a wide variety of industries in the business world. Their services included article writing, marketing materials, e-newsletters, social media, white papers, and web content and development.

== Products ==
Shakespeare Squared created projects for CB Richard Ellis, Honor Flight Chicago, Houghton Mifflin, Hudson Highland Group, McGraw-Hill, McDougal Littell, Pearson Education, and Riverside Publishing, among others. Their products included children's books, teacher guides, student workbooks, and online universities. Samples of their work include:

- Articles–HowStuffWorks
- Teacher guide and student activity pages–Zondervan
- Lesson plans and activities–Habitat for Humanity International
- Cosmeo Explorations–Discovery Communications
- I Can Read!–HarperCollins
- George's Secret Key to the Universe–Simon & Schuster

== Recognition and awards ==
- Alfred P. Sloan Award for Business Excellence in Workplace Flexibility (2010)—Honorable Mention
- Alfred P. Sloan Award for Business Excellence in Workplace Flexibility (2009)
- Chicago Innovation Award Nominee (2008)
- Alfred P. Sloan Award for Business Excellence in Workplace Flexibility (2008)
- 30 Best Places to Work in Illinois (2008)
- Inc. 500 Fastest Growing Private Companies in America (2007)—No. 5 Ranking in Education, No. 329 Ranking Overall
- Working Mother Best 25 Small Companies (2007)
- Business Ledger's Entrepreneurial Excellence Awards (2007)—Nominee in the "Today’s Young Entrepreneur" category

== Media spotlights ==
- Crain's 40 Under 40–Kim Kleeman (2008)
- Fox News Chicago, "Some Workplaces Making Themselves More Baby-Friendly" (October 31, 2008)
- MSNBC, "Your Business"
- Inc. Magazine, "The Way I Work: Kim Kleeman" (2007)

== See also ==
- List of Illinois companies
