= Blackhawk Township, Rock Island County, Illinois =

Coordinates: 41°26′28″N 90°35′35″W

Blackhawk Township
- Township
- Location in Rock Island County

- Rock Island County's location in Illinois
- Country: United States
- State: Illinois
- County: Rock Island
- Established: October 1, 1857

Area
  - Total: 29.8 sq mi (77 km^{2})
  - Land: 28.03 sq mi (72.6 km^{2})
  - Water: 1.77 sq mi (4.6 km^{2}) 5.94%

Population (2010)
  - Estimate (2016): 9,799
  - Density: 357.5/sq mi (138.0/km^{2})
- Time zone: UTC-6 (CST)
  - Summer (DST): UTC-5 (CDT)
- FIPS code: 17-161-06301

Blackhawk Township is located in Rock Island County, Illinois. As of the 2010 census, its population was 10,019 and it contained 4,563 housing units. Blackhawk Township changed its name from Camden County on October 1, 1857.

Quad City International Airport is partially within the township.

== Geography ==
According to the 2010 census, the township has a total area of 29.8 square miles (77 km^{2}), of which 28.03 square miles (72.6 km^{2}) (or 94.06%) is land and 1.77 square miles (4.6 km^{2}) (or 5.94%) is water.

== Demographics ==
Historical population
Census	Pop.	Note	%±
2016 (est.)	9,799
U.S. Decennial Census
