= Metropolitan Educational Enterprises =

Metropolitan Educational Enterprises, Inc. is a company founded in 1932 and based in Chicago, Illinois, that reportedly sells educational materials through independent contractors. The company often targets US military members as potential customers, sometimes even conducting door-to-door soliciting on military bases.

Military families have complained to the media that the company's representatives use deceptive selling techniques and hidden fees and charges. If military families fall behind on payments for expensive encyclopedias or educational materials, which customers report are often never or tardily delivered, the company used aggressive collection tactics, including calling the commanders of customer's military units.
