= Jatayu Airlines =

Indonesian airline

IATA	ICAO	Call sign
VJ	JTY	JATAYU
- Founded: 2000
- Ceased operations: 2007
- Hubs: Soekarno-Hatta International Airport
- Fleet size: 5
- Destinations: 10
- Headquarters: Jakarta, Indonesia
- Website: jatayuair.co.id

Jatayu Airlines (Jatayu Gelang Sejahtera) was an airline based in Jakarta, Indonesia. It operated domestic and international services from Jakarta and was established in 2000. Its main base was Soekarno-Hatta International Airport, Jakarta. On 26 June 2007, The Indonesian Transportation Ministry discontinued the airline's Aircraft Operator Certificate because of "the management's inability to consistently apply flight safety measurements as stipulated."

== History ==
Jatayu Airlines was founded in 2000 and ceased operations in 2007.

== Destinations ==
At the time operations were ceased, Jatayu Airlines flew to the following destinations:

=== Domestic ===
- Banda Aceh - Sultan Iskandar Muda International Airport
- Batam - Hang Nadim Airport
- Jakarta Soekarno-Hatta International Airport - main hub
- Medan Polonia International Airport - focus city
- Palembang - Sultan Mahmud Badaruddin II International Airport
- Pangkal Pinang - Depati Amir Airport
- Pekanbaru - Sultan Syarif Qasim II International Airport

=== International ===
- Penang - Penang International Airport

== Fleet ==
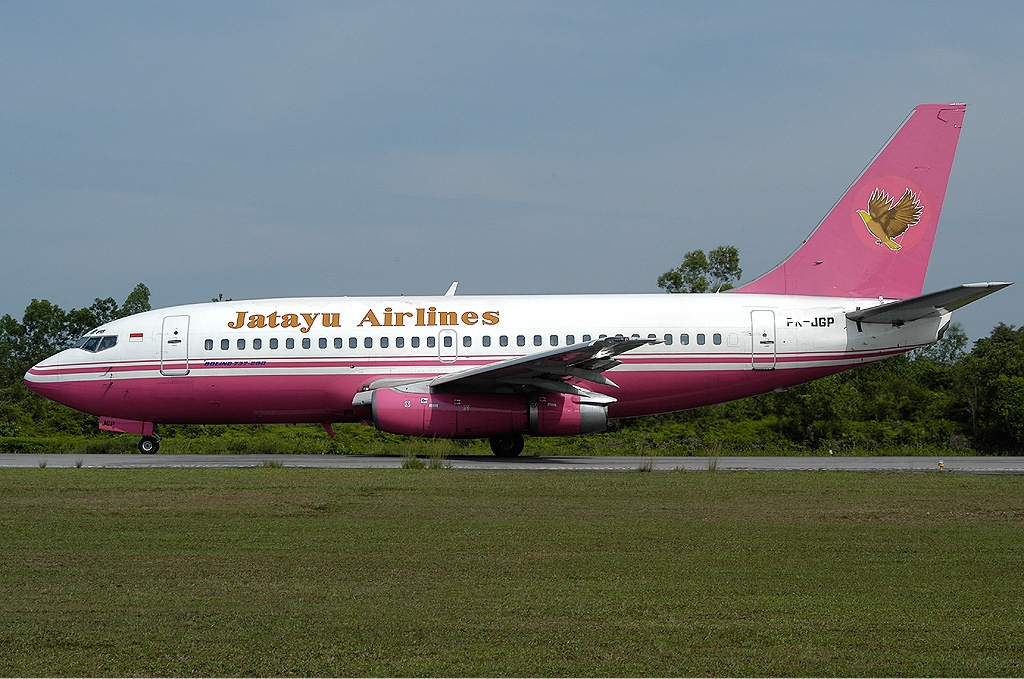
Jatayu Airlines Boeing 737-200 at Pekanbaru

=== Previously operated ===
In November 2005 the airline also operated:

- 5 Boeing 737-200

By end of 2005, only 5 737-200 were active as the airline retired all 727s in that year prior to closure in 2007.
