= Aventinus of Tours =

French Roman Catholic saint

Saint Aventinus
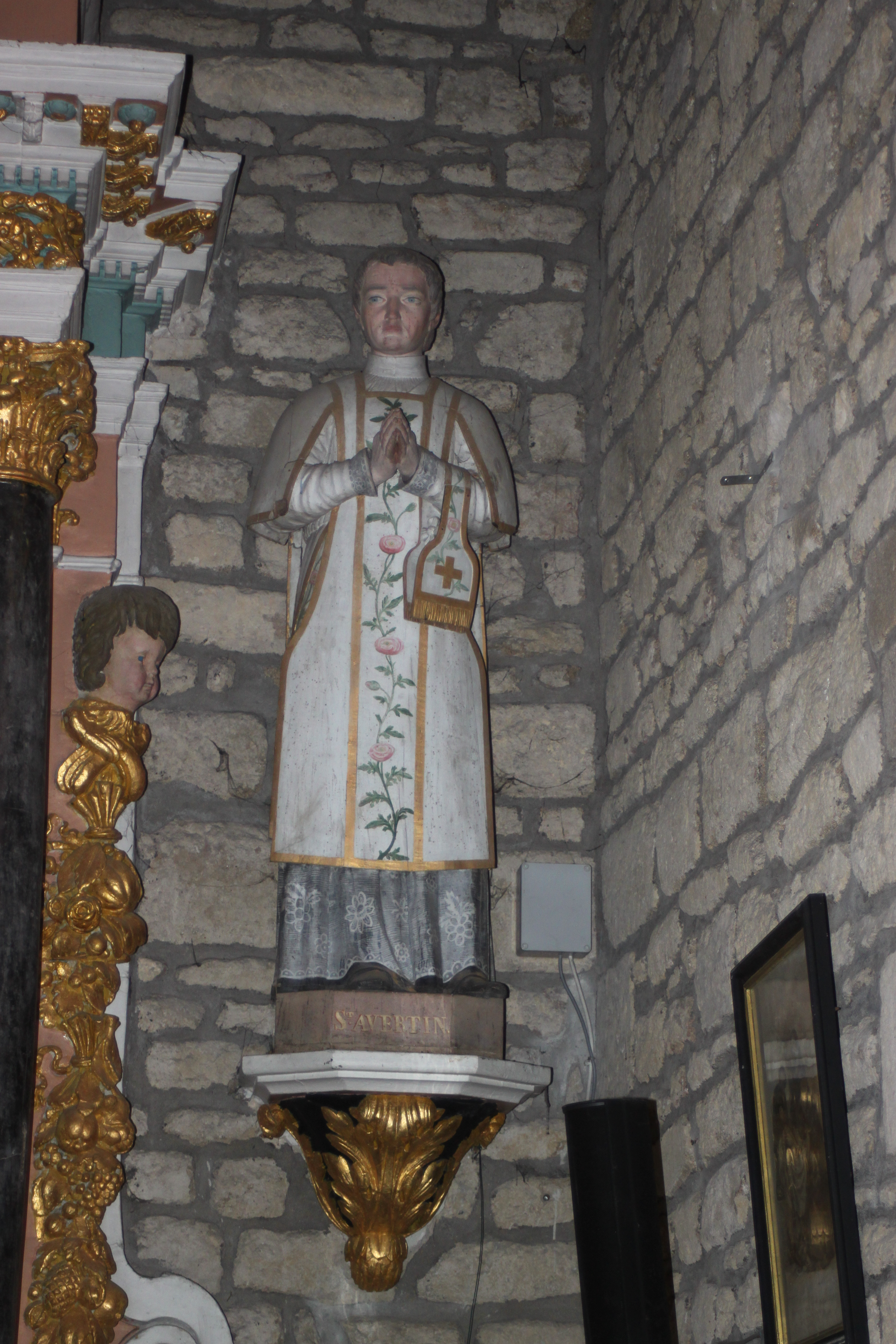
- Died: 1180; Touraine, France
- Venerated in: Roman Catholic Church
- Feast: 5 May

Aventinus was a hermit and friend of Thomas Becket. Living the life of a hermit in Tours, France, before being ordained a deacon by Thomas Becket, and subsequently accompanied him to the Synod of Tours in 1163.

After the martyrdom of Thomas Becket in 1170, Aventinus settled in Touraine, France, where he remained until his death, in 1180.
