= Waves for Water =

2017 documentary by Maximilian Haidbauer

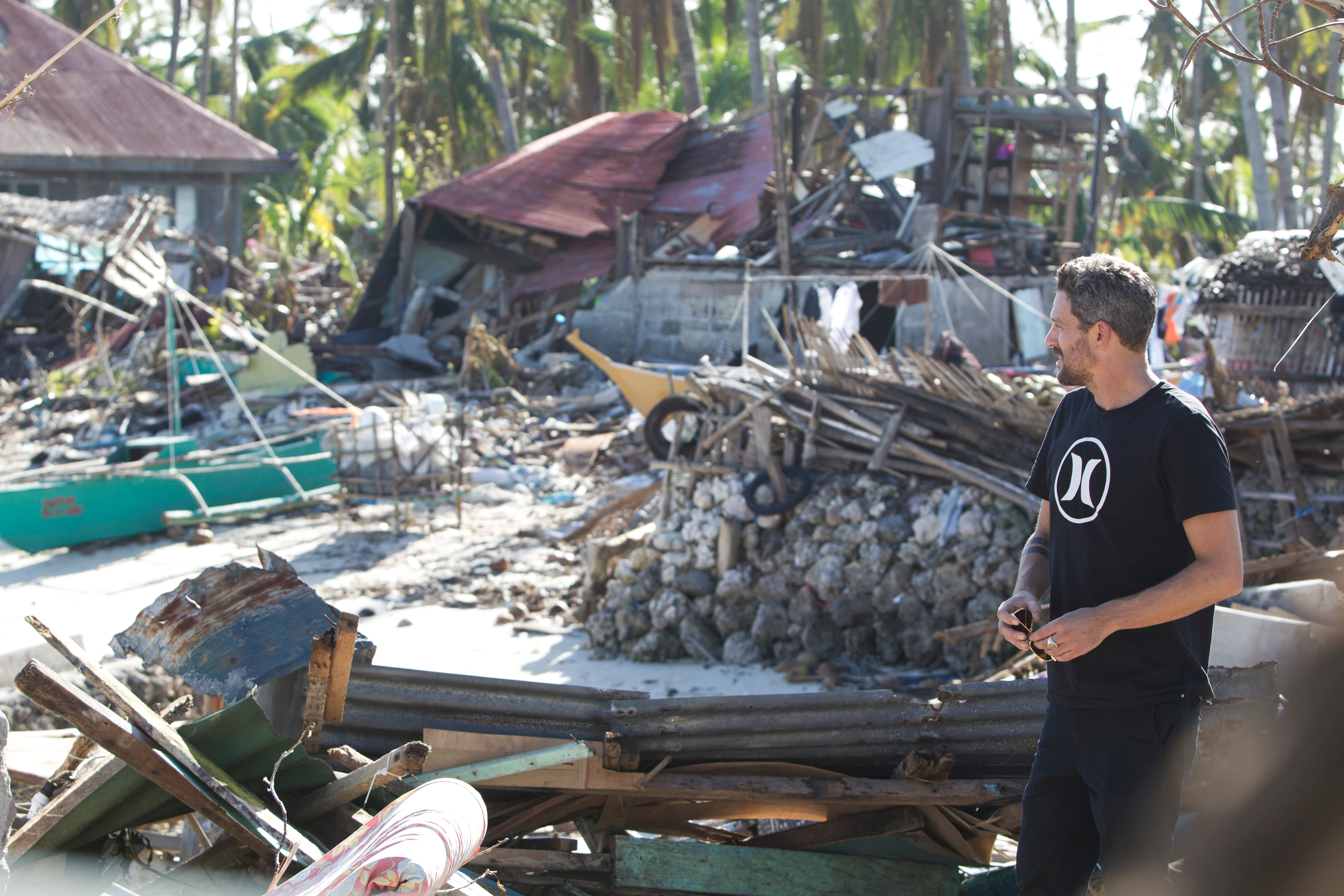
- Jon Rose in the Philippines
- Directed by: Maximilian Haidbauer
- Produced by: Abigail Shafran MacCarthy, Maximilian Haidbauer
- Starring: Jon Rose, Rosario Dawson, Patricia Arquette, Bob Hurley
- Cinematography: Robbie Stauder, Blair Maddigan
- Edited by: Alejandro Valdes-Rochin
- Distributed by: Red Bull Media House
- Release date: March 22, 2017
- Running time: 52 minutes
- Country: United States
- Language: English

Waves for Water is a 2017 documentary film produced and directed by Maximilian Haidbauer.

The film is about Jon Rose, a former professional surfer who created the organization Waves for Water to bring clean drinking water to Third World populations.

== Synopsis ==
“Waves for Water is a non-profit group that creates access to clean water worldwide. The 60-minute documentary follows Rose to Haiti, the Philippines and Brazil.

The film includes interviews with Rose and his collaborators. It shows how Waves for Water grew from a surf trip to Sumatra to an international NGO with brand partners including PayPal and BMW. .

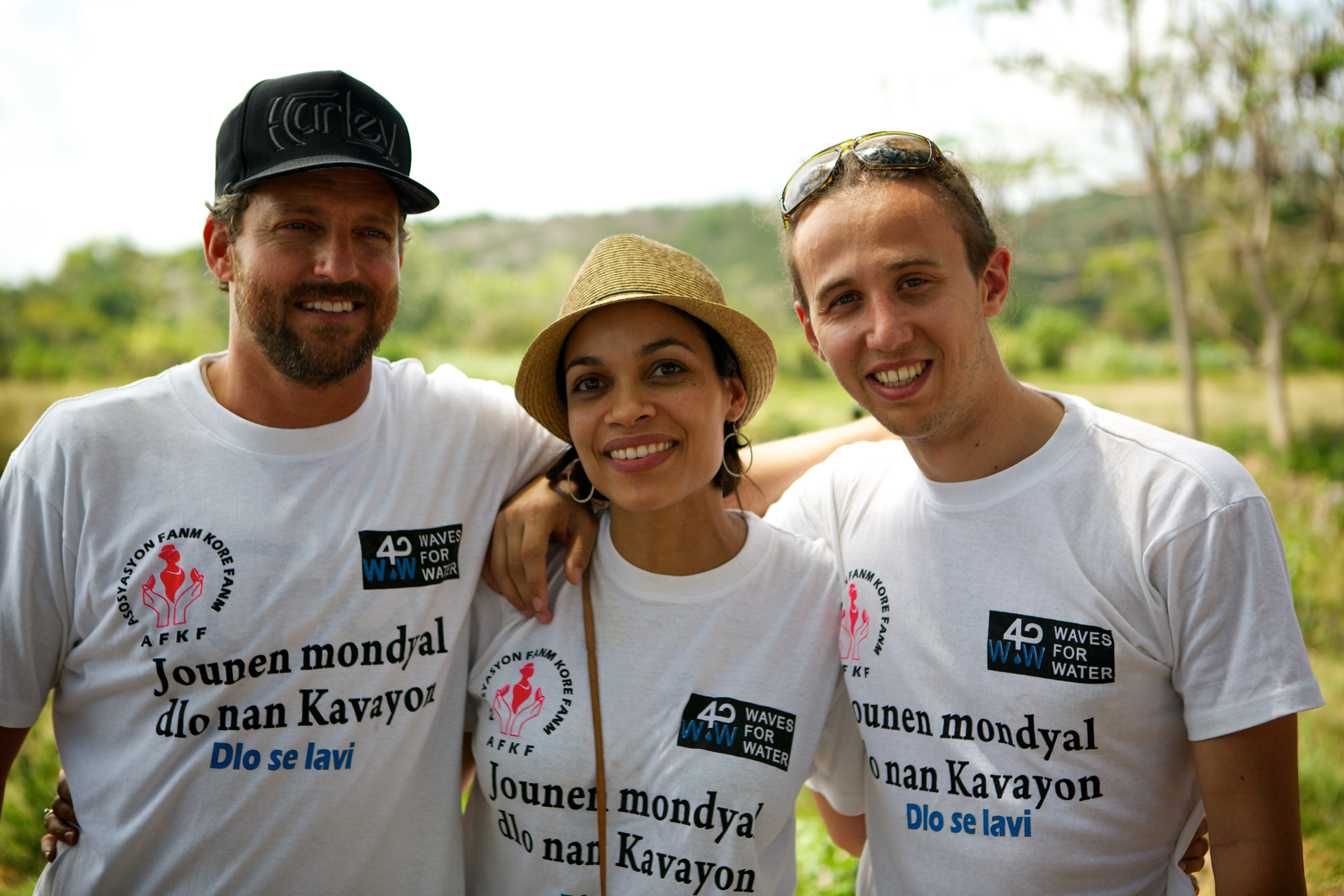
Jon Rose, Rosario Dawson and Maximilian Haidbauer in Haiti 2014

== Cast ==
- Jon Rose
- Rosario Dawson
- Patricia Arquette
- Bob Hurley
- Neymar JR
- Guga Ketzer
- Jack Rose
- Jordan Tappis
- William Gardner
