= Mrs. Fisher's =

American brand of potato chips

Mrs. Fisher's, Inc.
- Product type: Snack foods
- Current owner: Roma and Mark Hailman
- Country: United States
- Previous owners: 1932 - Ethel Fisher
- Website: www.mrsfisherschips.com

Mrs. Fisher's, Inc., also known as Mrs. Fishers Potato Chips, is a regional manufacturer of potato chips founded in Rockford, Illinois. The company was begun in 1932 by Ethel Fisher and today is one of the oldest chip manufacturers in the Midwest and is the recognized brand name of potato chips in parts of the Midwestern United States.

== History ==
According to the Mrs. Fisher's website, it was Eugene Fisher, Ethel (Feldt) Fisher's husband, who had the idea of producing potato chips. Eugene and Ethel cooked chips to earn extra money during The Depression. The logo for Mrs. Fisher's potato chips, invented by Eugene in the first year of business, has changed little over the years. The logo features a 'potato-man' wearing a top hat dancing in a circle with two children. Packaging for Mrs. Fisher's also features bright red and yellow striping along the edges. Originally, the brand carried the name "Mr. and Mrs. Fisher's"; but when Eugene Fisher later deserted his wife and daughter and the business, Ethel Fisher removed his name from the branding.

The company, which still operates out of Rockford, was eventually sold by Ethel Fisher to truck driver Sylvester Hahn in 1949. Employee Anthony Marsili, and his brother Mario, purchased the business in 1962. Later, and for 29 years, the company was owned by Chuck, Pete and Paul DiVenti. The company is currently owned by Roma and Mark Hailman, former employees who bought the company in 2007. Since its inception Mrs. Fisher's has remained a locally run company. Mrs. Fisher's chips are sold in northern Illinois and southern Wisconsin.

== Products ==
Currently Mrs. Fisher's produces several types of potato chips: regular, rippled, BBQ, BBQ rippled, French Onion, and dark chips. The dark chips are made from a different potato. The company also produces caramel corn, nuts and other items under separate label.

The company has been estimated to produce around 600 tons of potato chips per year.

== FDA regulation ==
In 2017, Mrs. Fisher's was forced to make big changes in its traditional recipe when the U.S. Food and Drug Administration (FDA) issued a ban on partially hydrogenated oils. Since the ruling, Mrs. Fisher's has adjusted their chip recipe to use hydrogenated soybean oil instead. The company states that it has been the third time in the company's history that an FDA regulation has caused the company to change their recipe.

== See also ==
- Rockford, Illinois
- Potato chip
