= Pacific Bearing Company =

American manufacturing and distribution company

- Company type: Privately held company
- Industry: Manufacturing
- Predecessor: Premac, Inc
- Founded: Rockford, Illinois, U.S. (December 14, 1962)
- Headquarters: Roscoe, Illinois, U.S.
- Number of locations: 1 manufacturing plant, 4 warehouses (2010)
- Area served: Worldwide
- Key people: Robert Schroeder (Owner and CEO); Thomas Schroeder (Owner and General Manager)
- Products: Plain bearings, rolling-element bearings, 3D printers
- Services: Engineering; Cost reduction Contract manufacturing
- Owner: The Schroeder family
- Subsidiaries: PBC Linear; PBC Lineartechnik GmbH; 3DP Unlimited
- Website: pbclinear.com

Pacific Bearing Company, dba PBC Linear and PBC Lineartechnik GmbH, is a manufacturer and distributor of plain bearings, linear guides and custom machined parts.

== History ==
Prodo Mach Corporation, the predecessor to Pacific Bearing, was incorporated December 1962 in Rockford, Illinois, before changing its name to Premac, Inc in 1963. The company purchased precision machine shop assets from Harsco Corporation's Globe Imperial division, which had been in the Rockford area since the 1940s. Premac originally manufactured ball valves; through the 1960s and 70s it expanded into making skid plates and contract machined parts for large midwestern companies, including Caterpillar, John Deere, International Harvester, Kendon Exeter and J. I. Case.

Premac was purchased by the Schroeder family in 1981 and was nearing bankruptcy by 1982, mainly due to lack of demand when Caterpillar went on strike and International Harvester left the agricultural market. The owner, Robert Schroeder, incorporated the "Pacific Bearing Company" in 1983 in an attempt to dissociate the business from the Rust Belt. Pacific Bearing was originally created as the sales company for Premac, but the two officially merged in 1985. During the 1980s, the re-formed company shifted focus from metalworking to bearing manufacturing. Its first bearing product was a line of self-lubricating bearings; the company also manufactured bushings, thrust bearings, and skid plates, and continued to produce custom parts.

By the turn of the century, Pacific Bearing had reciprocal trade agreements with manufacturers in Japan and Europe, expanding the range of products it could offer and opening new markets for its own products overseas. The company changed names again in 2008, becoming "PBC Linear". This name change coincided with the opening of a European office under the name "PBC Lineartechnik GmbH". In 2009, PBC won Design World's "Leadership in Engineering" award for work in motion control.

== Products ==
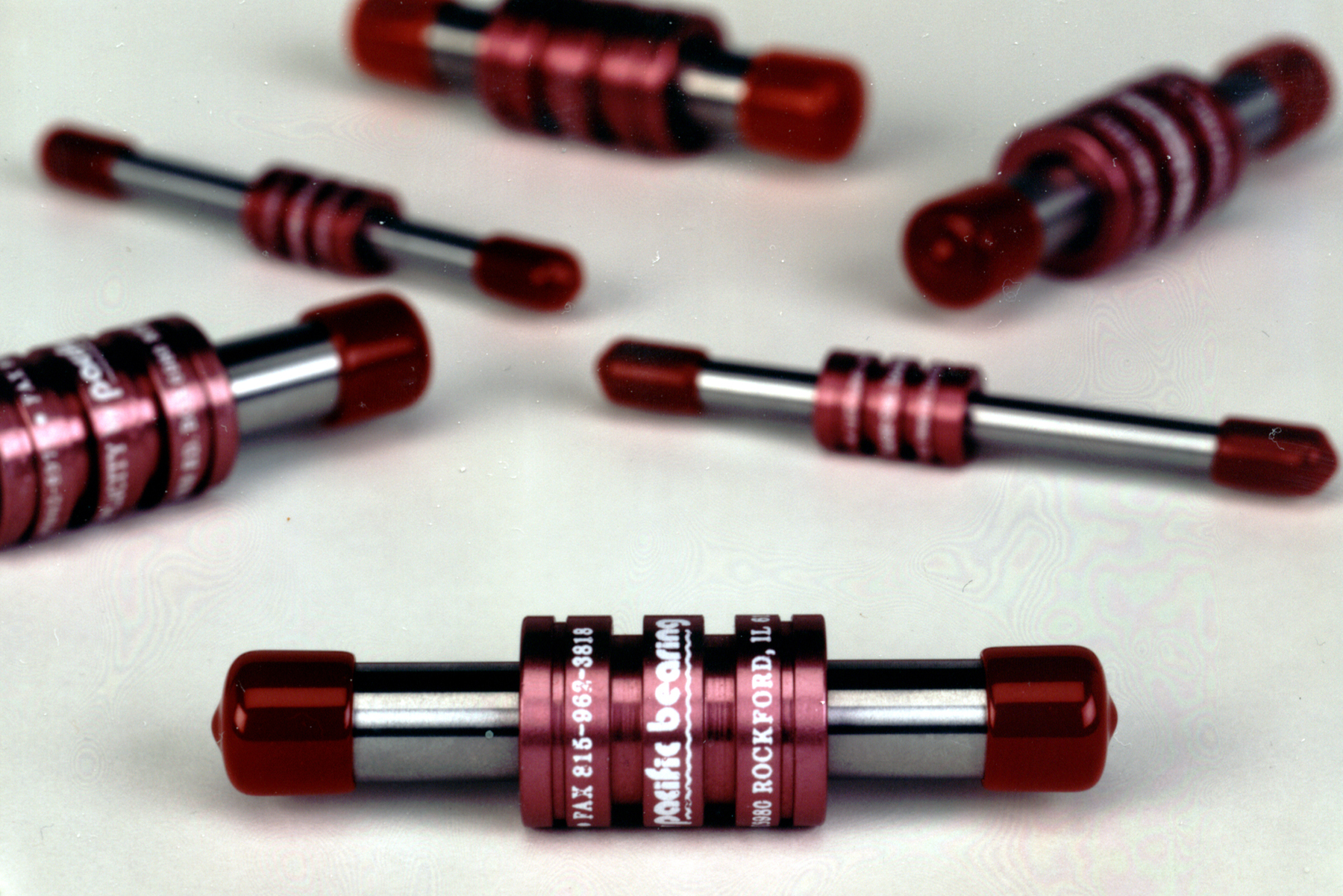
"Little Red Bearing" product sample

As Premac, the company manufactured ball valves and contract parts for heavy industry. By the 1980s, it was producing round bushings and saddle bearings for hydraulic pumps.

Pacific Bearing's initial product line was the Simplicity bearing, a linear bearing that uses a special Teflon compound to provide lubrication and extend product life. The bearings are designed to be size-interchangeable with standard bearings. PBC went on to offer ISO metric and JIS metric versions of its bearings in addition to the original imperial sizes. PBC developed pillow block, flanged, and die set bearings as well.

The company holds multiple patents. By 2019, its products included linear guides, linear actuators, rails, bushings, and several types of bearings.
