= Thomas Research Products =

- Company type: Subsidiary
- Industry: Lighting
- Founded: 1997
- Headquarters: Elgin, IL, USA
- Products: LED Drivers Surge Protectors
- Parent: Hubbell Lighting Inc.
- Website: trpssl.com

Thomas Research Products is a lighting manufacturer that is wholly owned by Hubbell Lighting Inc. Based in Elgin, Illinois, the company designs, manufacturers and supplies energy-saving electronic lighting components and integrated light engine modules for luminaires.

== Company Profile ==
Thomas Research Products was founded in 1997 as a manufacturer of quartz restrike controls which sense when a high intensity discharge light is extinguished, and automatically light a standby secondary light source in commercial and industrial lighting.

Over time, the company expanded its product line to include additional electronic controls for both HID and fluorescent lighting. The company also added LED power supplies, known as drivers, and accessories.

In 2012, the company began to develop LED light engines, beginning with the introduction of a complete module that provided an energy efficiency rating exceeding 100 lumens per watt. The following year, the company entered the AC LED market with light engine modules that do not require LED drivers. In 2014, the company moved to a larger facility in Elgin, IL with larger manufacturing, warehouse, engineering and office space.

== Company history ==
- 1997 - Thomas Research Products founded as a manufacturer of quartz restrike controls for HID lamps.
- 1998 - Expands product line to include additional HID and fluorescent controls.
- 2000 - Thomas Research Products becomes part of the newly formed Varon Lighting Group.
- 2007 - Adds LED, fluorescent, HID and induction surge protectors to product line.
- 2008 - The company's contact voltage detection switch wins 2008 LFI Innovation Award.
- 2008 - Thomas Research Products adds LED drivers to its product line.
- 2008 - The Varon Lighting Group acquired by Hubbell Lighting Inc., Thomas Research Products continues to operate independently.
- 2010 - Continued expansion of LED driver product line.
- 2012 - Introduced step-dimming modules for LED luminaires. LED Core™ Light Engine Module Exceeds 100 lumens per watt efficiency.
- 2013 - Developed more advanced surge protectors for outdoor luminaires.
- 2014 - The company moved to Elgin, IL. Introduced complete line of standard DC-based light engines
