= GlobalTap =

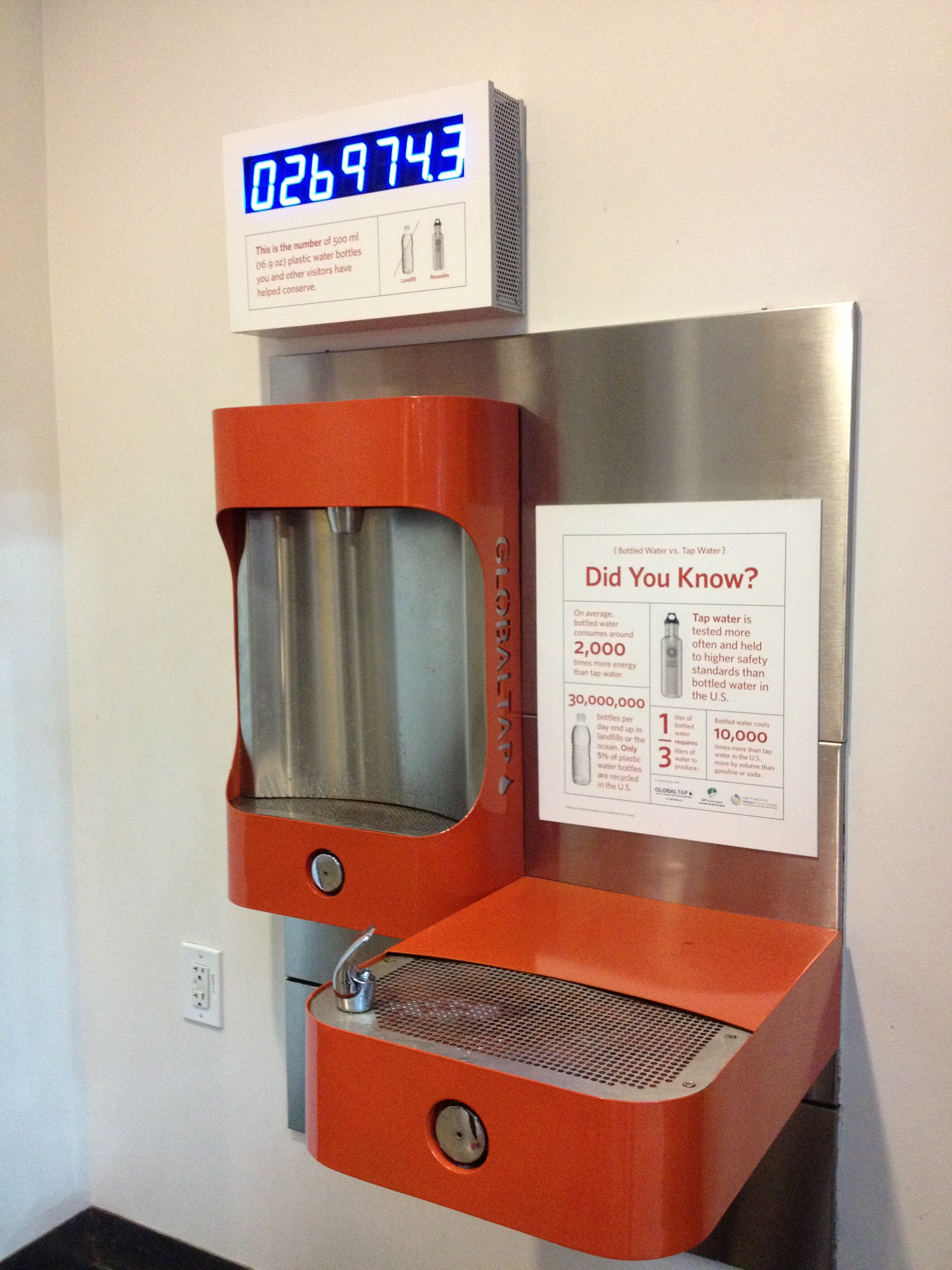
- A GlobalTap at the California Academy of Sciences
- Industry: Water Purification
- Founder: Daniel H. Whitman

GlobalTap is an American company that makes water fountains that provide free water refills for reusable water bottles, with the goal of making clean water more accessible and to cut back use of plastic water bottles. GlobalTap was started in 2008 by Daniel H. Whitman, an architect from Chicago, Illinois in the United States. The fountain was designed by IDEO.

GlobalTap has partnerships with the cities of London and Paris. In 2009, Globaltap started a partnership with the San Francisco Department of the Environment and the San Francisco Public Utilities Commission to install GlobalTap systems in the city. In 2015, GlobalTap was involved in a contract issue of trade secret misappropriation claim regarding product manufacturing.
