= Brewer Investment Group =

- Type: Private
- Industry: Wealth Management
- Founded: 2000
- Founder: Steven J. Brewer, Founder
- Headquarters: Chicago, Illinois, U.S.
- Services: Financial Services, Futures, Forex, Insurance.
- Website: www.brewerinvestmentgroup.com

Brewer Investment Group is a wealth management firm founded in 2000 and headquartered in Chicago, Illinois.

The firm owns five subsidiary companies: Brewer Financial Services; Brewer Investment Advisor (RIA); Advisor Resource; Brewer Futures Group; and Brewer Insurance Group.

The Securities and Exchange Commission announced that, on October 28, 2010, it filed a civil action in the United States District Court for the Northern District of Illinois, Eastern Division, against Brewer Financial Services, LLC ("BFS"), a registered broker-dealer, Brewer Investment Advisors, LLC ("BIA"), a registered investment adviser, Brewer Investment Group, LLC ("BIG"), their parent holding company, and their managing principals/officers, Steven Brewer and Adam Erickson, for allegedly participating in a fraudulent offering of promissory notes. BFS, BIA, and BIG are based in, and Brewer and Erickson reside in, Chicago, Illinois.

The Complaint alleges that, from June 2009 through at least September 2010, the defendants raised approximately $5.6 million from 74 investors who invested in promissory notes issued by an Isle of Man company. Although investors were told that their money would be used to repay certain debts of the issuer's parent company, and thereby release assets that would be used to secure their promissory note obligations, the Complaint alleges that nearly all of the offering proceeds were transferred to BIG and its subsidiaries. According to the Complaint, in addition to misrepresenting the manner in which the offering proceeds would be used, the defendants failed to tell investors that BIG and its subsidiaries were in a precarious financial state. In addition to sustaining substantial operating losses from the inception of the offering through the present, BIG had failed to make required interest payments to investors by July 1, 2010, and had failed to meet its own payroll obligations by August 2010. The Complaint alleges that, notwithstanding, and without disclosing, this material information, the defendants continued selling promissory notes to new investors for at least three additional months. According to the Complaint, the note offerings were not registered with the commission.

== Divisions/Subsidiaries ==
Brewer Financial Services, LLC is Brewer's main subsidiary, a full-service broker-dealer specializing in wealth management with twenty-seven additional offices across the United States.

Brewer Investment Advisors, LLC is RIA advisory services and management of investor assets. Works closely with Brewer Financial Service.

Advisor Resource, LLC is research & international wholesaling of third-party investment products for broker-dealers, RIAs (Registered Investment Advisors), and trust departments.

Brewer Futures Group, LLC is an Introducing Broker with futures and forex (off-exchange foreign currency futures and options) trading, managed trading programs, market commentary and educational resources.

Brewer Insurance Group, LLC is an insurance brokerage division.
