= Group O =

American business process outsourcing company

Group O, Inc.
- Type: Private
- Industry: Business process outsourcing
- Founded: 1974
- Headquarters: Milan, Illinois, U.S.
- Key people: Gregg Ontiveros, CEO; Robert Ontiveros, Chairman & Founder
- Products: Marketing, Supply Chain Management, Packaging and Business Analytics
- Revenue: US$559 million
- Number of employees: 1,500
- Website: http://www.groupo.com

Group O, headquartered in Milan, Illinois, is one of the largest Hispanic-owned companies in the U.S. and a provider of managed products and services.

== History ==
Group O was founded in Milan, Illinois in 1974 by Robert Ontiveros. Bob's initial business, Bi-State Packaging, was started to sell packaging materials and equipment to manufacturers. During the 1970s Bi-State Packaging experienced sales growth, requiring the opening of several warehouses throughout the United States, Mexico and Puerto Rico – making Group O an international business.

In 1979, Group O opened R&O Specialties to provide supply chain solutions to industrial and consumer products companies. R&O Specialties brought a focus on process management and a Six Sigma culture to Group O that permeates the entire company to this day.

In 1990, Group O identified additional opportunities for growth in the area of marketing support services and created Group O Direct. This venture took Group O into customer loyalty and marketing fulfillment programs which required Group O to develop competencies in the areas of: data management, printing, direct mail, promotional campaign management and business process outsourcing.

In 2007, those three separate companies merged under Group O to become the three divisions – Packaging Solutions, Supply Chain Solutions and Marketing Solutions – that make up Group O. In 2008, Group O began offering print procurement and premium managed services to its clients. In 2013, Group O began to promote its Business Analytics offerings as a fourth vertical, aligned closely with its Marketing Solutions division.

In 2012, CEO Gregg Ontiveros was recognized by the United States Hispanic Chamber of Commerce as the HBE Hispanic Businessman of the Year.

In 2013, Chairman Robert Ontiveros was presented with the Order of Lincoln Award, recognized as the state of Illinois' highest honor.

In 2013, Group O presented the first of five Hispanic MBA scholarships to a student attending Notre Dame University, partnering with the U.S. Hispanic Chamber of Commerce.

Group O has over 1,500 employees across 34 U.S. facilities and is recognized as one of the largest Hispanic-owned businesses in the U.S.

== Products and Services ==
The company is specialized in marketing services, print management, business analytics, decision sciences, business process outsourcing, managed services, packaging, supply chain management and third-party logistics. The company targets a broad range of industries, including: food and beverage, telecommunications, manufacturing, consumer packaged goods, financial services, pharmaceutical, health care, retail and technology.

=== Clients ===
The company's major clients include AT&T, Bristol-Myers Squibb, Caterpillar, Frito-Lay, Kraft Foods, Microsoft, PepsiCo, and Staples.

== Company ==
=== Management ===
Current CEO is Kevin Kotecki. Robert Ontiveros is the founder and chairman of the company. Bob Marriott was named CFO.

=== Awards and Facts ===
- 15th Largest Hispanic Owned Business, by revenue, in the United States
- 2011 National Minority Supplier of the Year (Greater than $50M US revenue) - National Minority Supplier Development Council
- 25 Largest Employers in the Quad City Region (14th)
- 3rd Largest Company, by employees, headquartered in the Quad City Region
