= Aventine Renewable Energy =

- Company type: Subsidiary of Pacific Ethanol, Inc.
- Industry: Biofuels
- Founded: 1981
- Headquarters: United States
- Products: Corn ethanol Corn gluten Corn germ
- Website: www.pacificethanol.com

Aventine Renewable Energy, founded in 2003, was a bioethanol and biodiesel company based in Pekin, Illinois that produced and marketed these biofuels.

Aventine engaged in the production and marketing of corn-based fuel-grade ethanol in the United States. Aventine marketed and distributed ethanol to many of America's leading energy and trading companies. Aventine’s facilities produced several co-products while manufacturing ethanol, such as distillers grain, corn gluten meal and feed, corn oil, corn germ and grain distillers dried yeast. Aventine marketed these co-products primarily to livestock producers and other end users as a substitute for corn and other sources of starch and protein.

Aventine's main office was located in Pekin, Illinois and the comoany had operations in Pekin, Illinois and Aurora, Nebraska.

The company, which was delisted from the New York Stock Exchange after its stock crashed after initially being listed in 2006, filed Chapter 11 bankruptcy on April 8, 2009. It emerged from bankruptcy March 16, 2010.

On July 1, 2015, Pacific Ethanol, Inc. acquired Aventine Renewable Energy Holdings, Inc. through a merger with AVR Merger Sub, Inc., one of Pacific Ethanol's wholly owned subsidiaries.

== See also ==
- Verbio
