= GoHealth =

Medicare marketplace

GoHealth, Inc.
- Trade name: GoHealth
- Type: Public
- Traded as: Nasdaq: GOCO
- Industry: Healthcare
- Founded: 2001; 25 years ago, in Chicago, Illinois, U.S.
- Founders: Clint Jones; Brandon Cruz
- Headquarters: Chicago, Illinois, U.S.
- Area served: United States
- Key people: Vijay Kotte (CEO); Brandon Cruz, (co-executive chairman); Jason Schulz (CFO)
- Products: Medicare Advantage; MediGap; Medicare Part D; Individual Health Insurance; Final Expense Insurance
- Revenue: ▲US$800 million (2020)
- Number of employees: 1,500
- Website: gohealth.com

GoHealth, Inc. is an American marketplace for Medicare plans including Medicare Advantage, MediGap and Medicare Part D, which are programs administered through private health insurance companies. It also operates an online health insurance marketplace offering individual health insurance and short-term health insurance.

In 2012, GoHealth became a government-approved exchange after a deal was signed into place by the Obama administration and the Centers for Medicare & Medicaid Services (CMS). This would allow GoHealth to enroll people in the same plans and offer the same tax-subsidies found on HealthCare.gov. CMS signed the deal with a few private health insurance marketplaces including GoHealth in an effort to provide affordable premiums from the increase in enrollment.

In 2013, GoHealth acted as the first of the private health insurance marketplaces to enroll Americans in subsidy-eligible ObamaCare plans, following the technical challenges from HealthCare.gov's launch. Soon after a fix for broker functionality was implemented on HealthCare.gov, the company utilized their call centers to help Americans enroll in both on-exchange and off-exchange plans while on the phone. While customers had the ability to start the enrollment process using GoHealth's website, speaking with a representative allowed for the company to confirm a person's eligibility for subsidies and complete enrollment. The regulatory approval to enroll people in these plans only applied to residents from the 36 states that used the federal insurance exchange in lieu of a state exchange.

In 2016, after growth from the Affordable Care Act slowed and following the departure of the former President Barack Obama from office, GoHealth turned its focus to Medicare.

GoHealth is headquartered in Chicago, Illinois, with locations in Charlotte, North Carolina, Lindon, Utah, and Bratislava, Slovakia.

== History ==
GoHealth, originally named Norvax, Inc., was founded in 2001 by Clint Jones and Brandon Cruz. The business initially started by creating websites and lead management software for insurance brokers.

In 2008, then-company Norvax offered online comparison health insurance shopping.

In 2009, Norvax, Inc. was renamed to GoHealth.

In 2012, GoHealth received a $50 million investment from Norwest Equity Partners.

In 2013, GoHealth was appointed by the federal government to enroll eligible residents from 36 states in subsidized health exchange-based plans, made available under the Patient Protection and Affordable Care Act, otherwise known as Obamacare.

In 2013, GoHealth purchased 90,000 sq. ft. in Merchandise Mart, expanding its Chicago locations to four.

In 2015, ADP partnered with the company to help employees, who did not have employer health insurance coverage, enroll in subsidized health plans.

In 2016, GoHealth opened a location in Charlotte, North Carolina.

In 2018, GoHealth opened a location in Lindon, Utah.

In 2019, Centerbridge Partners made a majority stake investment in GoHealth, with a valuation of approximately $1.5B (considered a unicorn status). The purchase became the largest of any Chicago-based technology company within the previous five years, and topped IBM's purchase of $1.3 billion for Cleversafe and SAP's purchase of $974 million for Fieldglass. Norwest Equity Partners retained a stake in GoHealth, while co-founders, Jones and Cruz, continued to hold substantial equity stake.

GoHealth announced a plan to file for IPO in June 2020.

On June 6, 2022, GoHealth announced its appointing of Vijay Kotte as CEO and Jason Schulz as CFO effective immediately. Co-founder and current chief executive officer, Clint Jones, would then become the Executive Chairman of the Board.

On June 7, 2026, GoHealth filed for Chapter 11 bankruptcy protection as part of a plan to transfer ownership of the company to lenders while also reinstating preferred equity, paying trade payables and ensuring cash payments to equity holders.

== Acquisitions ==
In 2015, GoHealth acquired software development company Creatix, based in Bratislava, Slovakia.
