= Elliott Aviation =

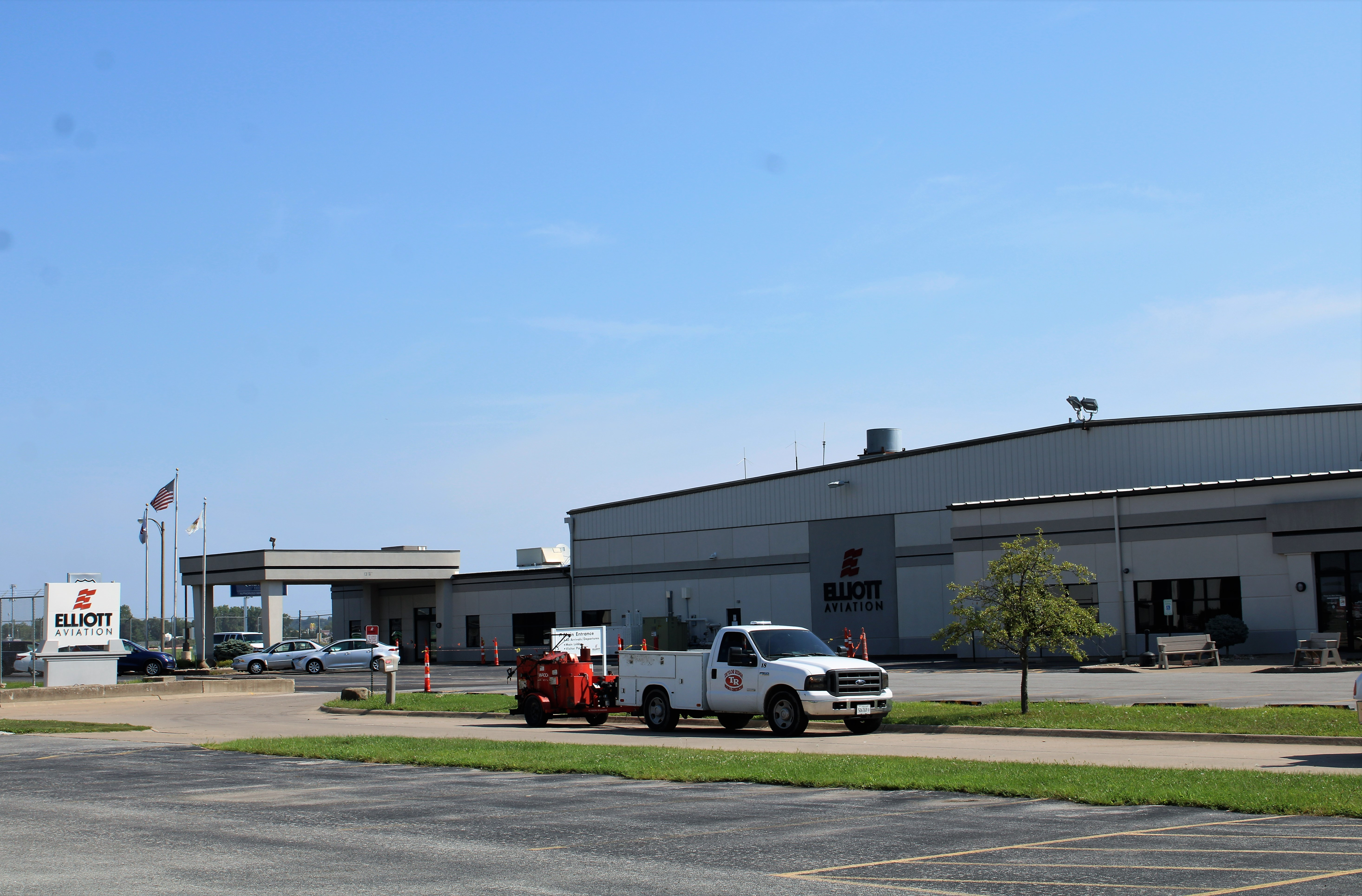
Part of the Elliott Aviation facility in Moline, Illinois

Elliott Aviation is a chain of fixed-base operators (FBOs) representing Beechcraft and Socata products. Headquartered in Moline, Illinois, Elliott Aviation has branches in Moline, Illinois, Des Moines, Iowa, and Minneapolis, Minnesota.

Elliott Aviation has been providing aircraft sales and aviation services since 1936. Elliott Aviation is an authorized service center for the following airframes:

- Hawker 125 Series
- Beechjet/Hawker 400XP
- Premier
- Phenom 100/300
- King Air
- Baron & Bonanza
