= Nortrax =

- Type: Subsidiary
- Industry: New and Used Sales, Rental, Parts, and Service of Heavy equipment
- Headquarters: Mississauga, Ontario, Canada
- Products: Construction, Forestry, Mining, & Utility Equipment
- Parent: John Deere

NORTRAX, Inc. was a Canadian corporation with headquarters in Mississauga, Ontario; Laval, Quebec; and Westbrook, Maine. Nortrax is a subsidiary of machinery manufacturer John Deere.

Nortrax sold heavy equipment, such as bulldozers and backhoes, for the construction, mining, forestry, and utility industries. Nortrax offered specialized field services for the equipment, which included 24-hour equipment fueling, daily maintenance, preventive maintenance, equipment inspections, and satellite support technology. The company was North America's main John Deere dealership group, extending across the eastern and central portions of the United States and Canada. Nortrax factory-trained technicians service all makes and models, with an extensive parts inventory.

== History ==
Nortrax expanded through purchases of dealerships to strengthen its market position against competition from Caterpillar Inc., with a few hiccups along the way, continuing through 2002.

Since 2003, Deere and Company has owned a majority stake in the company.

In 2005, Papé Machinery Inc. purchased the assets of the Western region of Nortrax, consisting of 8 locations in northern California and western Nevada.

Formerly headquartered in Moline, Illinois, in 2009 Nortrax opened its centralized shared services facility in Tampa, FL.

In January 2013, Nortrax celebrates grand opening of new 26,000-sq.-ft. facility in Miami, FL.

In 2015, John Deere approved the sale of eight Nortrax locations in Tennessee and Kentucky to Meade Tractor.

January 2016, Nortrax opened a new flagship location in Ottawa, ON.

In November 2017, Nortrax sold seven locations in Florida to Dobbs Management Service.

In October 2019, Nortrax Canada and Nortrax Quebec were sold to the Brandt Group of Companies.

In October 2021, The remaining 9 Nortrax Inc. stores were sold to Fernandez Holdings under United Construction & Forestry.
