= Quadracci =

Quadracci is a surname. Notable people with the surname include:

- Elizabeth Quadracci, American businessperson
- Harry V. Quadracci, American businessperson
