= Quadracci Pavilion =

Building part of the Milwaukee Art Museum, Wisconsin

- The pavilion seen from the south

General information
- Location: 700 N Art Museum Drive, Milwaukee, United States
- Coordinates: 43.0397°N 87.8970°W
- Construction started: 1997
- Inaugurated: October 13, 2001; 25 years ago
- Cost: US$121,000,000 to US$130,000,000
- Owner: Milwaukee Art Museum

Height
- Height: 27.4 m (90 ft) (roof); 50.1 m (164 ft) (pylon)

Technical details
- Material: concrete, steel, glass, Carrara marble, Wisconsin granite
- Floor area: 13,197 m^{2} (142,050 sq ft)

Design and construction
- Architect: Santiago Calatrava
- Architecture firm: Kahler Slater

Website
- mam.org

The Quadracci Pavilion is an architectural addition to the Milwaukee Art Museum in Milwaukee, Wisconsin. Designed by Spanish architect and structural engineer Santiago Calatrava, the pavilion was completed in 2001. It was Calatrava's first building in the United States The structure contains a reception hall, temporary exhibition space, an auditorium, a café, a museum shop, and underground parking. Its principal architectural feature is the Burke Brise Soleil, a movable steel sunscreen consisting of two wing-like assemblies positioned above the building's central hall.

The pavilion forms part of a museum complex that includes the Milwaukee County War Memorial Center, designed by Eero Saarinen, and a 1975 addition designed by David Kahler. Located beside Lake Michigan, the pavilion comprises a glass-enclosed reception hall and a cable-supported pedestrian bridge connecting the museum to the downtown side of Lincoln Memorial Drive. Its architectural forms have been compared to sails, birds' wings, and Gothic vaulting.

The project attracted national architectural attention following its opening. Though critics originally differed in their assessments of the relationship between its sculptural design and its function, the pavilion subsequently became a widely recognized symbol of the city of Milwaukee.

Though colloquially known as "the Calatrava", the building was actually named after Milwaukee philanthropists Harry V. and Elizabeth Quadracci, co-founders of the printing and marketing company Quad, who were major donors to the construction project.

== History ==
In 1957, the Milwaukee Art Institute and Layton Art Gallery combined their collections in the Milwaukee County War Memorial Center, designed by Finnish-American architect Eero Saarinen. The museum expanded in 1975 with a building designed by Milwaukee architect David Kahler yet, by the early 1990s, the museum was considering another expansion. The existing buildings provided galleries for the permanent collection but had limited facilities for temporary exhibitions and large public gatherings. The museum also sought to improve its visibility and create a more direct connection between the lakefront site and downtown Milwaukee.

In 1994, Santiago Calatrava was selected to design the addition over Japanese architects Arata Isozaki and Fumihiko Maki. Calatrava had previously worked on bridges, railway stations, and other structures characterized by expressive structural forms. His proposal introduced a new entrance complex rather than substantially enlarging the galleries devoted to the permanent collection. The program included approximately 980 m^{2} (10,500 sq ft) of flexible temporary exhibition space, together with public amenities and parking.

Construction began in December 1997. The lakefront location, which included reclaimed land, presented engineering challenges. A substantial concrete foundation was required, and the complex geometry of the building necessitated specialized construction methods. The project increased considerably in cost during its development. Early estimates were approximately $20 million, while the completed project cost was reported at roughly $121 million to $130 million, depending on which associated expenditures were included. These figures encompassed more than the pavilion itself, including landscape improvements and work on the existing museum. The increase reflected changes in the project's scope as well as the costs associated with its construction. The pavilion opened in October 2001.

The pavilion became associated with Milwaukee's public image during the years following its opening. Visit Milwaukee, the city's tourism marketing organization, incorporated an image of the building into its logo from 2005 until 2024. The building also became a venue for civic gatherings and public events in addition to museum programming. In 2026, the museum marked the pavilion's twenty-fifth anniversary with an exhibition documenting its design and construction, while the Quadracci family established a $10 million endowment fund for the preservation of the building.

== Architecture ==
Described as postmodern or futuristic, the Quadracci Pavilion's architectural language incorporates references to both natural and constructed forms, with its roof and movable sunscreen suggesting wings or sails, while the lake-facing end of Windhover Hall resembles the prow of a ship. The building was conceived as an extension of the surrounding public landscape.

=== Windhover Hall ===
Windhover Hall, looking toward Lake Michigan

Windhover Hall is the principal reception and circulation space of the Pavilion. Its glass roof rises approximately 27.4 m (90 ft) above the floor. The hall contains a series of white structural ribs, pointed arches, and supporting members resembling the flying buttresses of Gothic cathedrals. The hall's central space is flanked by circulation areas known as gallerias and opens toward views of Lake Michigan. Its interior includes marble flooring and exposed concrete structural elements. Windhover Hall serves as an entrance to the museum's galleries and as a venue for public and private events. The hall itself can be accessed without purchasing admission to the museum's exhibition galleries.

=== Burke Brise Soleil ===
External video
- Time lapse of the brise soleil opening and closing

Brise soleil fully open

The Burke Brise Soleil is a movable sunscreen installed above Windhover Hall. It consists of 72 steel fins arranged into two symmetrical wing-like assemblies. When fully extended, the structure has a wingspan of approximately 66.1 m (217 ft). Its individual fins range in length from approximately 8 m (26 ft) to 32 m (105 ft). The sunscreen is designed to regulate the amount of sunlight entering the hall through its glass roof. Its movement also changes the pavilion's exterior appearance. The wings are raised and lowered by a mechanical system, with a complete opening or closing cycle taking approximately three and a half minutes. The structure is equipped with sensors that monitor wind conditions: if winds reach over 37 km/h (23 mph) for at least three seconds, the wings are lowered. The use of kinetic structural elements is consistent with Calatrava's broader architectural practice, which frequently incorporates engineering components as visible elements of a building's design.

=== Reiman Bridge ===
Reiman pedestrian bridge from Museum Center Park

The Reiman Bridge connects the Pavilion to the downtown side of Lincoln Memorial Drive. Its structure is supported by an inclined mast and a system of tensioned cables. The bridge's total length is 87.5 m (287 ft) and the longest of its two spans approximately 73 m (240 ft), with a mast or pylon approximately 50.1 m (164 ft) high and inclined at 48 degrees. Its structural arrangement uses the mast and anchoring cables to support the pedestrian deck. The bridge provides an elevated approach to the museum and a viewing position for the pavilion's exterior.

=== Materials ===
The pavilion's main structure was built using reinforced concrete cast into specially fabricated timber forms. This construction method allowed the production of curved structural elements that would have been difficult to achieve using conventional rectilinear formwork. Steel is used extensively in the movable brise soleil (whose fins were originally conceived as carbon fiber elements) and the bridge, while large glazed surfaces enclose Windhover Hall. The foundation and supporting structure were designed for the conditions of the lakefront site.

== Reception and debates ==
The Quadracci Pavilion received considerable attention after its opening. Reviews frequently addressed its structural expression, unusual silhouette, function, and relationship to the existing museum buildings. The project also contributed to a wider discussion about the role of architecture in attracting visitors to cultural institutions.

In an October 2001 review for The New Yorker, architecture critic Paul Goldberger examined the relationship between the pavilion's public spaces and its exhibition facilities. Goldberger observed that the main architectural emphasis was placed on the reception hall and movable sunscreen, while the galleries were comparatively restrained. He regarded this separation as a response to the tension between the architectural identity of an art museum and its function as a place for displaying art. Writing for the Chicago Tribune, architecture critic Blair Kamin compared the pavilion's sculptural design to Frank Gehry's Guggenheim Museum Bilbao. Kamin emphasized the building's relationship to its waterfront setting and the range of nautical forms suggested by its exterior.

The project's cost and architectural priorities also became subjects of discussion. In a 2006 exchange published in The New York Review of Books, museum director David Gordon disputed aspects of Martin Filler's earlier criticism of Calatrava, particularly concerning the cost of the project and its intended function. Gordon argued that the pavilion had been commissioned primarily to provide public facilities and temporary exhibition space, rather than additional galleries for the permanent collection. He reported a total project cost of $121 million, of which approximately $100 million was attributed to the pavilion.

The pavilion has also been considered in relation to the use of distinctive cultural buildings as instruments of urban redevelopment and promotion. Its adoption in Milwaukee tourism branding provides a documented example of the building's use beyond its museum function. In 2022, Milwaukee Mayor Cavalier Johnson credited the building with helping the city's redevelopment, while Milwaukee County Executive David Crowley emphasized its importance to Milwaukee's identity.

The pavilion's mechanical components require maintenance beyond that associated with conventional fixed architectural elements. The Burke Brise Soleil is subject to inspections, mechanical adjustments, and weather-related operating restrictions. The museum uses an automated building-control system and has undertaken changes intended to improve energy efficiency. The building's long-term maintenance requirements have remained a consideration for museum administrators. In 2026, Milwaukee Magazine reported that an engineering team continued to conduct regular inspections of the wings and that a museum board committee oversaw the structure's long-term preservation.

== See also ==
- Milwaukee Art Museum
- Santiago Calatrava
- Kinetic architecture
- Museum architecture

== Bibliography ==
- Schulze, Franz (2001). Building a Masterpiece: Milwaukee Art Museum. Easthampton, MA: Hudson Hills Press.
- Jodidio, Philip (2002). Architecture Now! Volume 2. Los Angeles: Taschen. pp. 114–121.
- Kent, Cheryl (2005). Santiago Calatrava: Milwaukee Art Museum, Quadracci Pavilion. New York: Rizzoli.
- Tzonis, Alexander (2007). Santiago Calatrava: The Complete Works, Expanded Edition. New York: Rizzoli.
- Kamin, Bruce (2010). Terror and Wonder: Architecture in a Tumultuous Age. Chicago: University of Chicago Press.
- Lindsay, Georgia (2016). The User Perspective on Twenty-First-Century Art Museums. New York: Routledge. pp. 76–95.
