= Worldcolor =

Commercial printing company

World Color Press Inc.
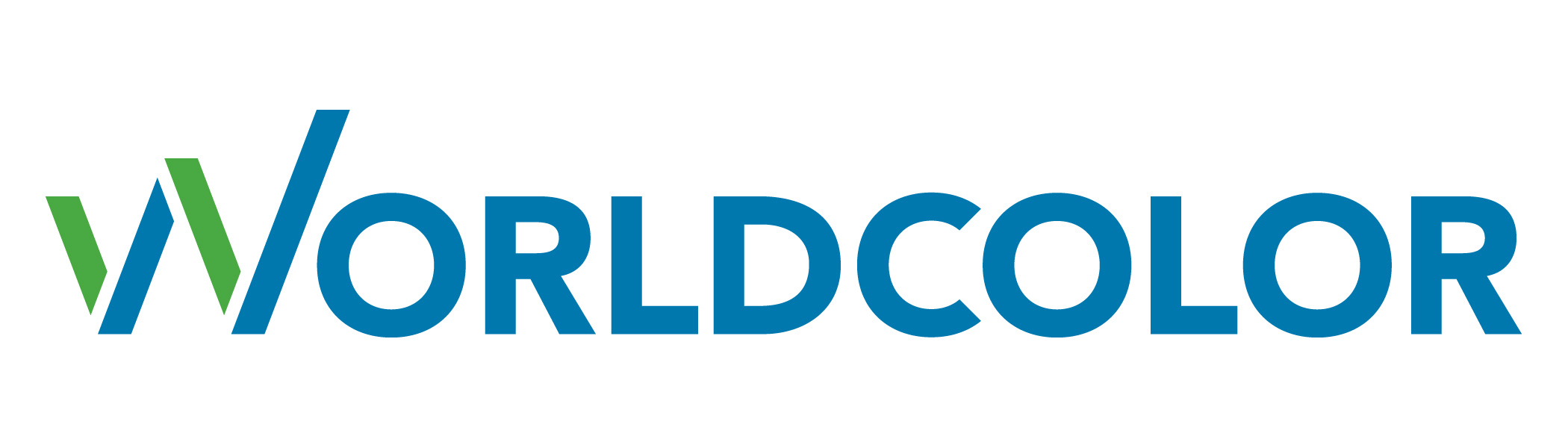
- Company type: Subsidiary of Quad/Graphics
- Industry: Commercial and industrial printing
- Founded: 1903
- Headquarters: Montreal, Quebec, Canada
- Key people: Mark Angelson, Chairman and CEO
- Revenue: $4,016.9 million USD (2008)
- Number of employees: 20,000 (2009)
- Website: worldcolor.com

World Color Press Inc. ("Worldcolor") (formerly Quebecor World) was a company which provided high-value and comprehensive print, digital, and related services to businesses worldwide. World Color and its subsidiaries printed various commercial products, including comic books, magazines, brochures, direct mail and newspaper inserts, and directories, while also providing clients a broad range of pre-press services, such as desktop production and assembly.

World Color was the first printer to make comic book printing a major part of its business throughout most of its history was the dominant North American printer of comics and associated publications. During its history, World Color was also at the forefront of many new technologies and printing innovations, including use of web offset presses, "pool shipping," rotogravure printing, computer technology, digital registration systems, and flexography.

World Color merged with Quebecor Printing in 1999; at the time World Color was the largest printer of consumer magazines in the United States and the third largest commercial printer in North America. Worldcolor was acquired by Quad/Graphics in early 2010.

== History ==
=== World Fair Color Printing ===
World Color Press was founded in 1903 by the owners of the St. Louis Star under the name World's Fair Color Printing. The wholly owned subsidiary was created to handle color printing for the upcoming 1904 St. Louis World's Fair, the Louisiana Purchase Exposition, and was expected to disband at the World Fair's conclusion. Instead, the company name was shortened to World Color Printing and continued as a commercial printer, focusing on a new business: the color "funnies" section of the Sunday newspaper.

=== Comics ===
World Color's first foray into comics was syndicating George Herriman's Major Ozone's Fresh Air Crusade from January 2, 1904, to November 19, 1906. During this period, World Color also distributed the Herriman strips Grandma's Girl—Likewise Bud Smith, which he combined from two earlier strips, and a two-tiered children's strip, Rosy Posy—Mama's Girl.

Robert Grable and Roswell Messing, Sr., two St. Louis Star senior employees, purchased the company in 1922. As the popularity of the Sunday color comic section increased, the funnies quickly evolved into an American institution, and metropolitan papers increasingly began featuring comic supplements. As the first major printer of color sections, World Color Press was often the first choice for printing these sections, and by the early 1930s, the company had printing contracts with newspapers nationwide.

In the early 1930s, realizing the sales potential of the comics medium, company management attempted to maximize profits by reprinting the funnies in magazine format, thereby creating one of the first prototypes of the comic book. While the initial comic books were simply collections of previously published editions of the Sunday comic strips, by 1936 they contained original material.

World Color made the most of the idea and quickly emerged as the leading printer in this new field. To keep up with ever-increasing demand, the company began construction of a satellite printing plant in Sparta, Illinois. Opened in 1948, the Sparta plant was the most technologically advanced plant in the industry devoted solely to the printing of comic magazines.

Within five years World Color Press became the largest producer of comic magazines in the industry. Comic book sales boomed during World War II and the postwar period, and throughout this period, World Color was the nation's leading comic book printer. (Comics were the most popular form of newsstand magazine.)

In 1956, the company installed one of the first web-offset presses in its Sparta plant. This innovative printing process, in which rolls or "webs" of paper are fed through rubber-blanketed cylinders, producing tens of thousands of impressions an hour, helped lead the industry into the modern era of print technology. By the early 1970s, World Color purchased more equipment and expanded its plants, becoming the largest player in the comic and newsstand special-interest publication market.

June 18, 1977, was declared "World Color Press Day": a comic book about the history and process of printing color comics was produced by the Joe Kubert School of Cartoon Art; it was called, Magazineland USA: Sparta, Effingham, Salem, Illinois.

By the early 1980s World Color Press printed most American comic books, including those of the industry giants Marvel and DC. World Color's dominance in the field led to a 1984 lawsuit by Illinois-based First Comics, accusing them of anti-competitive practices. The suit was resolved in the spring of 1988. In 1985, DC Comics named World Color Press as one of the honorees in the company's 50th anniversary publication Fifty Who Made DC Great.

=== Diversification and growth ===
The development of the web-press in the 1950s enabled World Color to further diversify into the relatively new product lines of web-printed newsstand and special interest magazines. Equally important to the company's growth during the 1950s was its development of the "pool shipping" concept, a distribution method in which publications from different customers going to the same destination were shipped together, reducing freight costs and increasing the timeliness of deliveries. By establishing the first major pool shipping network to newsstands, the company was able to expand its customer base by offering the lowest distribution costs in the industry.

World Color computerized many aspects of its business in the 1960s, providing the company with more efficient production and distribution capabilities, as well as the ability to perform more complicated printing procedures and reproduce more complex data. In 1969, World Color started construction of a web-offset facility in Effingham, Illinois, approximately 120 miles northeast of Sparta. The new plant was designed to produce magazines printed on coated paper with extensive use of four-color printing. Success in this arena led to a 1971 expansion of the Effingham plant that nearly doubled its original size. The 1971 addition increased the company's ability to produce large-circulation monthly magazines printed on letter-press equipment.

Responding to a need to increase the company's flexibility in scheduling presses, in 1970, the company standardized the make and type of its presses. This change was expected to result in paper savings, more consistent quality, and schedule flexibility. Though it was a short-term risk, the strategy paid off with its clients, enabling the company to become a stronger competitor in the four-color, high-quality magazine market.

In 1975, the company expanded its gravure division by constructing a plant between Effingham and Sparta. Further expansions in client-base led to the 1980 construction of another new plant in Des Plaines, Illinois. By the beginning of the 1980s, the company had emerged as the leader in the printing and distribution of consumer publications, with sales of more than $371 million. During the 1980s, World Color added seven state-of-the-art printing facilities, strategically located throughout the United States, strengthening the company's reputation for providing low distribution costs. In 1985, World Color Press was listed as the fourth largest printer in North America, with sales totaling $544 million.

By 1993, World Color's core business was magazine printing; contracts with hundreds of leading periodicals, including U.S. News & World Report, Cosmopolitan, Rolling Stone, and Forbes, accounted for approximately half of the company's 1993 revenues. (The company came to the aid of competitor R.R. Donnelley & Sons in January 1995, printing 300,000 issues of People magazine for Donnelley after flood waters forced the closing of a Donnelley plant near Los Angeles.) During this period, World Color expanded its operations into a number of specialty services: catalog printing contracts generated more than a fifth of total revenues in 1993, and represented the company's fastest growing division.

== Business acquisitions and mergers ==
World Color's early dominance in the comics market led the company to diversify, their first move being the 1928 purchase of another St. Louis-based printer, Commercial Color Press, which specialized in printing weekly newspapers and circulars. This diversification helped the company survive the lean years of the Great Depression.

In 1968, World Color was purchased by New York-based City Investing, prompting World Color to move its headquarters from St. Louis to New York.

In 1974, as World Color shifted focus to the high-end magazine market, the company purchased Louisville, Kentucky-based Fawcett Printing. This acquisition enabled World Color Press to add the rotogravure printing process to its repertoire.

In 1984, the investment giant Kohlberg Kravis Roberts & Co. bought World Color from City Investing, providing the company with continued financial backing. In 1989, World Color acquired Chicago's Bradley Printing, and in December 1991, they acquired California's third-largest printer, George Rice & Sons. In January 1993, they purchased catalog/direct mail printer Alden Press. With these acquisitions, in just a few years World Color became a major player in the catalog and commercial publishing arenas.

World Color pursued major expansions in 1996 and 1997, purchasing Ringier America and Rand McNally's Book Services Group, thereby becoming second in size only to RR Donnelley. In 1999, the company merged with Quebecor Printing in a U.S. $2.7 billion deal to create Quebecor World (USA) Inc., moving its headquarters to Montreal. At the time of the merger, World Color operated 17 production, distribution, and sales facilities throughout the United States.

=== Financial struggles ===
Quebecor World entered a difficult period in the early 2000s as the market has gradually shifted focus to digital media. Quebecor World filed for Chapter 11 bankruptcy protection on January 21, 2008, at the United States Bankruptcy Court for the Southern District of New York. In May 2009, RR Donnelley tendered an unsolicited bid to purchase Quebecor World; this was rejected as the company emerged from creditor protection in July 2009 (having changed its name back to "Worldcolor Press"). On July 2, 2010, Quad/Graphics purchased Worldcolor.

== Locations ==
By the time of its purchase by Quad/Graphics, Worldcolor had facilities located in the United States, Canada, Argentina, Brazil, Chile, Colombia, Mexico, the United Kingdom, and Peru.

== Corporate Governance ==
Recent members of the board of directors of Worldcolor were:

- Mark Angelson (Chairman): Former CEO of RR Donnelley and leading architect of the 2003–2007 printing industry consolidation
- Tom Ryder: Former Chairman and CEO of Reader's Digest, also sits on the boards of Amazon.com, Virgin Mobile and Starwood
- Jack Kliger: Former President and CEO of Hachette Filipacchi
- Raymond Bromark: Chairman of the Audit Committee of CA, Inc., and a retired senior partner of PricewaterhouseCoopers
- Michael Allen: Printing Industry Veteran
- David McAusland: Canadian Lawyer and Former Senior Officer of Alcan Inc.
- Gabriel de Alba: Managing Director and Partner of Catalyst Capital Group of Toronto

== Principal subsidiaries ==
- Alden Press
- Bradley Printing
- George Rice & Sons
- Midwest Litho Arts
- Network Color Technology
- Universal Graphics
- Web Inserts
