= Elizabeth Quadracci =

Businessperson

Elizabeth "Betty" Ewens Quadracci (April 3, 1938 – December 9, 2013) was an American businesswoman and philanthropist who co-founded the Sussex, Wisconsin, United States, based Quad/Graphics with her husband, Harry V. Quadracci and was the president of Quad Creative, the company's graphic design unit.

In 2024, Quad launched a new creative agency named Betty in her honor.

She was also a publisher, and eventually president, of Milwaukee Magazine.

== Philanthropy ==
The main theater at the Milwaukee Repertory Theater is called the Quadracci Powerhouse Theater. The name is in recognition of Quadraccis gift of leadership of the theater company's endowment fund in the 1990s as well as Betty Quadracci's contributions and support of the group as a board member during the 1980s when the theater complex was built.

In 2001, Betty and her husband, Harry V. Quadracci, helped finance an addition to the Milwaukee Art Museum designed by Santiago Calatrava. The Quadraccis donated $10 million in a donation-matching challenge they spearheaded. The addition was named the Quadracci Pavilion.

Betty donated 1 million dollars to Divine Savior Holy Angels High School in Milwaukee to build “The Quad,” a cafeteria and gathering space located outside the school’s theater.

== Death ==
Betty died at 75 years old in December 2013.
