= Research & Education Association =

American educational publishing company

- REA Company Logo
- Parent company: LSC Communications
- Status: Active
- Founded: 1959
- Founder: Max Fogiel, Ph.D.
- Country of origin: United States
- Headquarters location: Piscataway, New Jersey
- Distribution: Worldwide
- Publication types: Test Preparation Guides
- Nonfiction topics: Standardized Tests
- Official website: www.rea.com

Research & Education Association (REA) publishes test preparation materials and study guides, both in print and electronic form.

== History ==
REA was founded by Max Fogiel in 1959 as an educational publisher, concentrating on problems and solutions, or what's known as test preparation today. The company produced the iconic "Problem Solver" series of comprehensive solution guides. The Problem Solver series eventually encompassed over 30 topics with more than 28,000 problem/solution sets, covering differential equations, electric circuits, electronic circuits, precalculus, calculus, advanced calculus, algebra and trigonometry, physics, linear algebra, statistics, organic chemistry, mechanics, thermodynamics, electromagnetics, geometry, chemistry, probability, materials strength, heat transfer, economics, robotics, discrete math, fluid mechanics and dynamics, numerical analysis, optics, topology, electronic communications, operations research, and several others.

Recently REA has focused on providing digital test banks through its online study center. The company has specific test-prep modules for some of America's most well known standardized tests, including the GED test, the College Board's CLEP credit-by-exam and Advanced Placement exam programs, and the ACT college admissions test.

The printing company Courier Corporation acquired REA in 2003. Courier was acquired by RR Donnelley in 2015. RR Donnelly split into three in 2016; REA became part of LSC Communications.

== See also ==
- Educational Testing Service
- Standardized test
- Teaching to the test
- List of standardized tests in the United States
- Test (assessment)
