= Quebecor World =

History

Quebecor World Inc.
- Type: Public
- Industry: Commercial and industrial printing
- Founded: 1954
- Headquarters: Montreal, Quebec, Canada
- Key people: Jacques Mallette, CEO
- Number of employees: 43,000
- Website: www.worldcolor.com

Quebecor World Inc. was a printing subsidiary of Quebecor Inc. based in Montreal, Quebec. It comprised a number of small and large print shops throughout the world. In 2010, Quebecor World (now known as Worldcolor) was acquired by Wisconsin-based Quad/Graphics.

== History ==
Quebecor Printing started in 1954 with a single printing press. It began its expansion outside of Canada in 1985, when it bought Pendell Printing, a Midland, Michigan-based company and renamed Quebecor Pendell Printing Incorporated. The old Pendell plant became a Quad/Graphics (which acquired Quebecor World in 2010) until it closed in 2019. In 1988, it purchased the printing plants of Bell Canada Enterprises. This was followed by the 1990 purchase of the shops of Maxwell Graphics Incorporated of Minnesota from Maxwell Communication Corporation.

=== Merger with World Color Press ===
In 1999, Quebecor Printing merged with World Color Press in a US$2.7 billion deal to create Quebecor World. (World Color Press was founded in 1904 in St. Louis, MO. World Color had pursued major expansions in 1996 and 1997, purchasing Ringier America and Rand McNally's Book Services Group.)

=== Financial struggles ===
Quebecor entered a difficult period in the early 2000s as the market has gradually shifted focus to digital media. In response, the company's Board of Directors named Wes Lucas President and CEO, replacing Pierre Karl Péladeau, and announced a reorganization of its American book and magazine platforms, closing plants in Kingsport, TN, Phoenix, Arizona, and Brookfield, WI.

Quebecor World (USA) Inc. filed for USA Chapter 11 bankruptcy protection on January 21, 2008 at the United States Bankruptcy Court for the Southern District of New York, as well as for protection under the Canadian Companies' Creditors Arrangement Act at the Superior Court of Québec at Montreal. At the time of bankruptcy, the company's clients included printing publications for TIME, Parade, and also catalogs for Victoria's Secret.

In May 2009, Chicago-based printer RR Donnelley tendered an unsolicited bid to purchase Quebecor World, which was rejected as the company emerged from creditor protection in July (having changed its name back to "Worldcolor Press").

On July 2, 2010, Sussex, Wisconsin-based printer Quad/Graphics purchased Worldcolor.

== Locations ==
Quebecor had facilities in the United States, Canada, Brazil, France, the United Kingdom, Belgium, Spain, Austria, Sweden, Switzerland, Finland, Chile, Argentina, Peru, Colombia, Mexico, and India.

The former QW plant in Richmond Hill, Ontario was shuttered in early 2009, but the Aurora, Ontario location was acquired by Quad/Graphics and since sold to TC Transcontinental in 2013.

== See also ==
- Worldcolor
