= Josh Golden (businessman) =

American businessman

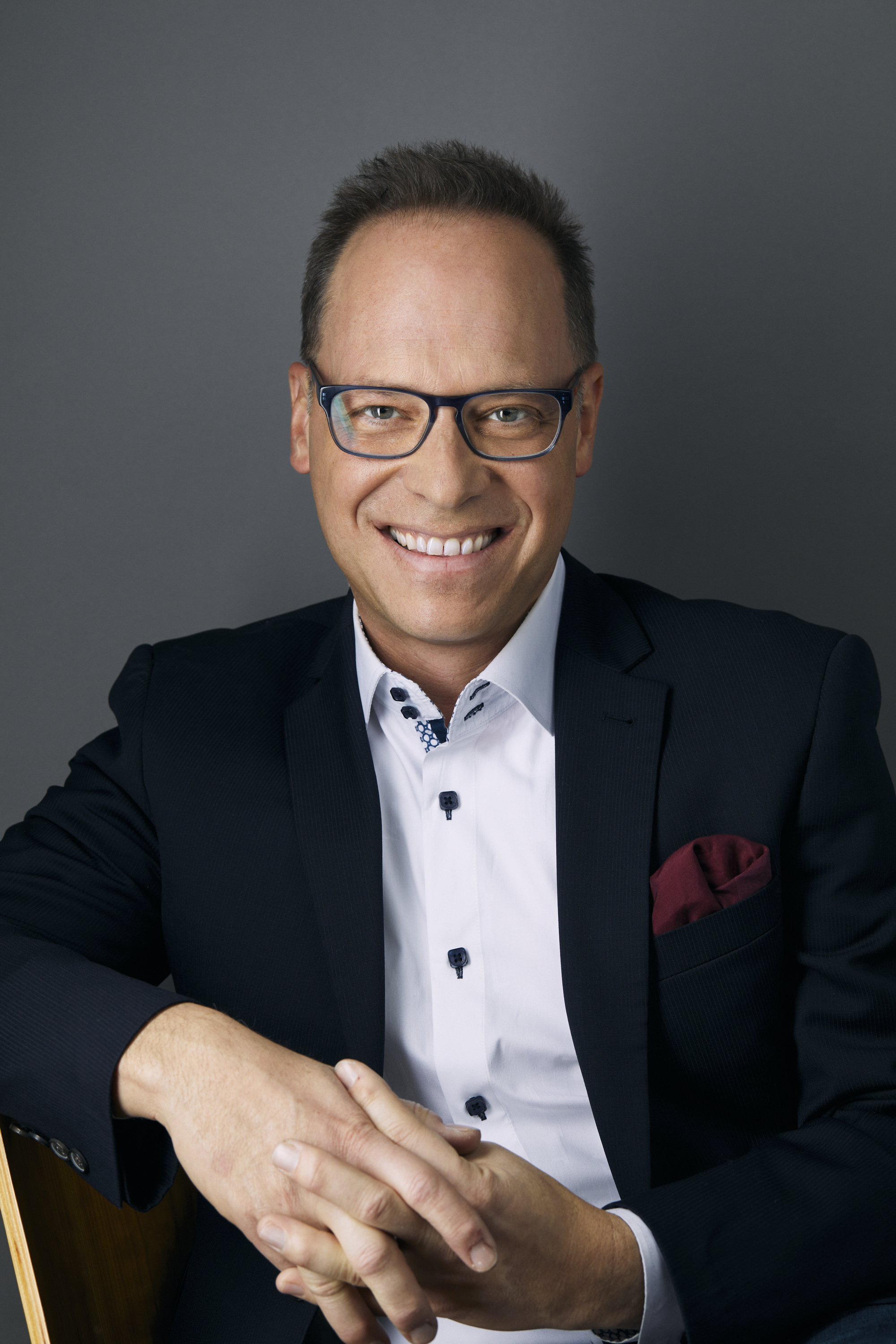
- Golden in 2022
- Education: NYU Stern (MBA); Ithaca College (BS)
- Occupations: Advertising, marketing, branding
- Known for: Ad Age
- Spouse: Jennifer Marks
- Children: 2

Josh Golden is an American marketing executive, branding strategist, and media specialist. He has held leadership roles including serving as president and publisher of Ad Age, vice president, global digital marketing and communications at Xerox, and group director of digital marketing at NBCUniversal, and has been a Forbes CMO Summit speaker. He has received award recognition at marketing organizations including the ADDY Awards and OMMA Awards (Online Media, Marketing and Advertising). During his tenure at Ad Age, the company won several Neal Awards and a Webby Award, among others.

== Early life and education ==
Joshua James Golden was born in Easton, Pennsylvania, to parents Steven and Marilyn Golden, where he attended Easton Area High School. He graduated from Ithaca College with a Bachelor's of Science degree in communications and later obtained an MBA from New York University Stern School of Business.

== Career ==
Golden began his career in film and TV as the head PA for Paramount's daytime television talk show, John & Leeza from Hollywood. He then transitioned into consulting and graphic design and created graphic exhibits for the OJ Simpson trial. He has worked for creative agencies Y&R New York, Euro RSCG (managing director, digital), and Grey New York (CDO). While Golden was the director of digital marketing at NBCUniversal, he was instrumental in the launching of Hulu.

In 2015, he was hired as vice president of global digital marketing and communications at Xerox where he led their biggest rebrand in its history, leading the company to win an IAC (Internet Advertising Competition) Award for "Outstanding Achievement in Internet Advertising" and "Best B2B Online Campaign."

In 2016, Golden was hired as publisher and later president at Ad Age, becoming the first publisher from outside Crain Communications in Ad Age's 86-year history. He led the rebrand from "Advertising Age" to "Ad Age" which revitalized the publication and subsequently went on the receive several industry awards.

Golden was hired as CMO at Quad in 2021.
