= LSC Communications =

American commercial printing company

LSC Communications, Inc.
- Type: Subsidiary
- Industry: Commercial printing
- Founded: 2016 (from corporate spin-off)
- Headquarters: 191 North Wacker, Chicago, Illinois, United States
- Revenue: ▼US$3.326 billion (2019)
- Operating income: ▼US$(157) million (2019)
- Net income: ▼US$(295) million (2019)
- Total assets: ▼US$1.649 billion (2019)
- Total equity: ▼US$(72) million (2019)
- Number of employees: 20,000 (2020)
- Parent: Atlas Holdings
- Subsidiaries: Dover Publications; Research & Education Association
- Website: lsccom.com

LSC Communications is an American commercial printing company based in Chicago, Illinois, and, as of December 2020, a fully owned subsidiary of Atlas Holdings. The company was established in 2016 as part of a corporate spin-off from RR Donnelley. It owns the publishers Research & Education Association and Dover Publications.

LSC is the largest producer of books in the United States.

== Acquisitions and divestitures ==
In 2017 and 2018, LSC made several purchases, including TriLiteral LLC (a book distributor owned by Harvard University Press, MIT Press, and Yale University Press), Donnelley Logistics (former parent RR Donnelley's logistics business), logistics company Fairrington Transportation, Creel Printing, Publishers Press, envelope producer Quality Park, and logistics company Clark Group.

In 2018, LSC announced the sale of all of its European printing operations to the Walstead Group.

== Failed buyout ==
In November 2018, Quad/Graphics announced their intent to purchase LSC in an all-stock deal. The purchase was expected to double Quad's business overall, primarily in magazines, catalogs, retail inserts and books. On June 20, 2019, the Department of Justice issued a press release indicating that it would sue to block the proposed purchase of LSC Communications by Quad Graphics. One month later, the companies announced they would discontinue the deal rather than fight the lawsuit.

== 2020 bankruptcy ==
In 2020, LSC Communications, Inc. and 21 affiliated debtors filed Chapter 11 bankruptcy in the United States District Court for the Southern District of New York. The company was purchased in December 2020 by the private equity holding company Atlas Holdings.
