= Bowne & Co. =

American company (1775–2010)

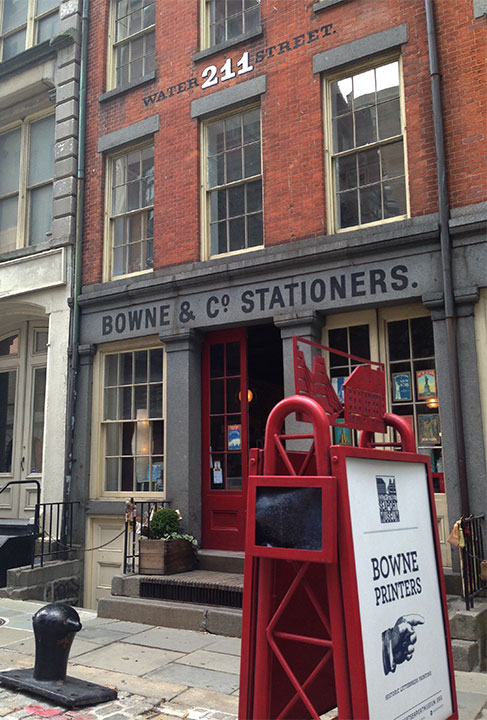
Bowne & Co. at the South Street Seaport

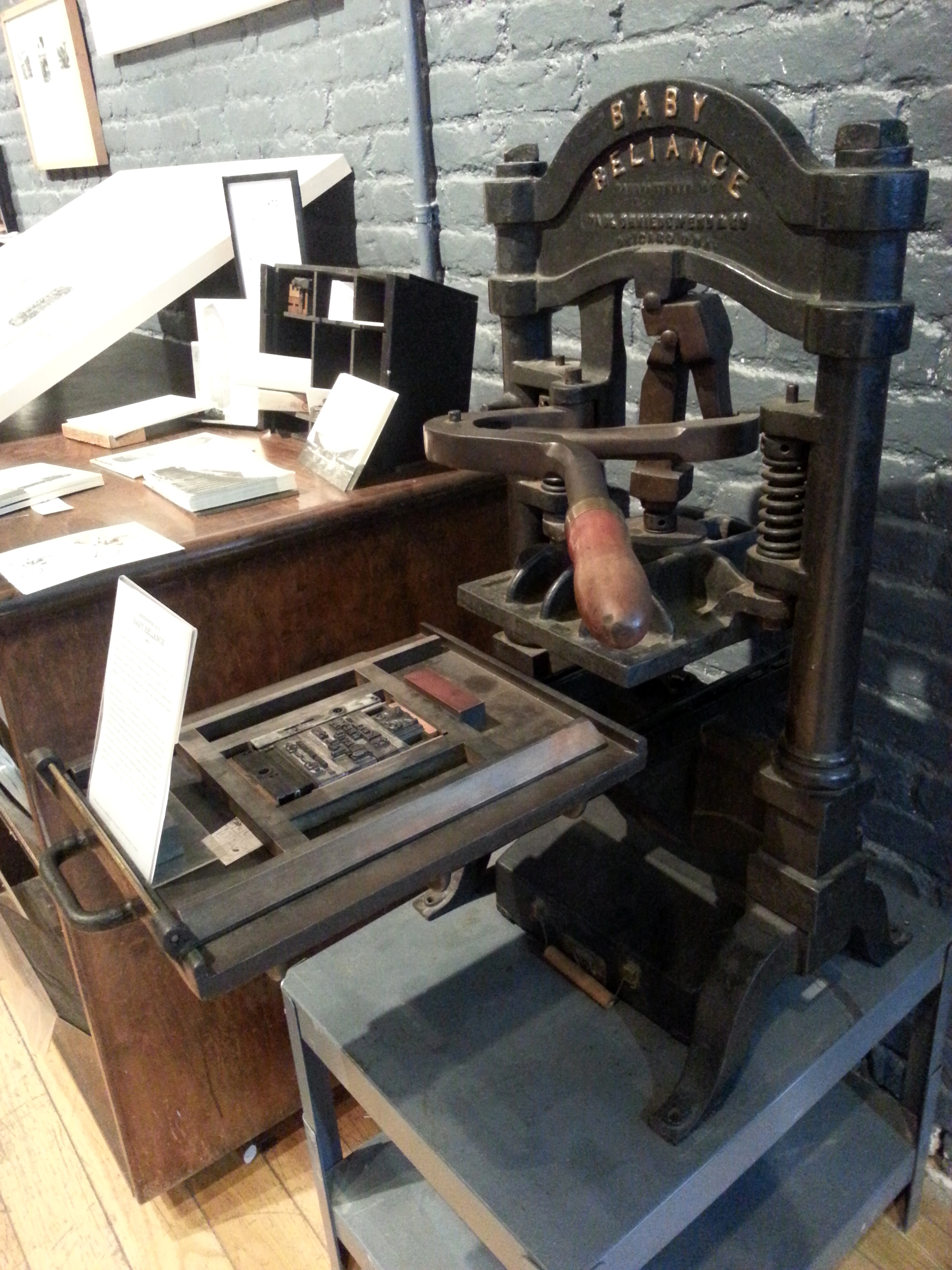
A Baby Reliance printing press from 1905 at the Seaport location

Bowne & Co., Inc. was an American company founded in 1775 by Robert Bowne. It provided financial, marketing, and business communications services internationally. From its initial listing on the American Stock Exchange until its acquisition in 2010, Bowne was the oldest publicly traded company in the United States.

In 1975, Bowne & Co., Inc. partnered with the South Street Seaport Museum to open a 19th-century-style print shop in the historic Seaport district of New York City. This print shop, billed as the oldest continuously running business in New York City, operates at 211 Water Street as Bowne & Co., Stationers.

Excluding Bowne & Co., Stationers, RR Donnelley acquired and completely absorbed Bowne & Co., Inc. in 2010.
