= David Kahler =

American architect and photographer (1937–2026)

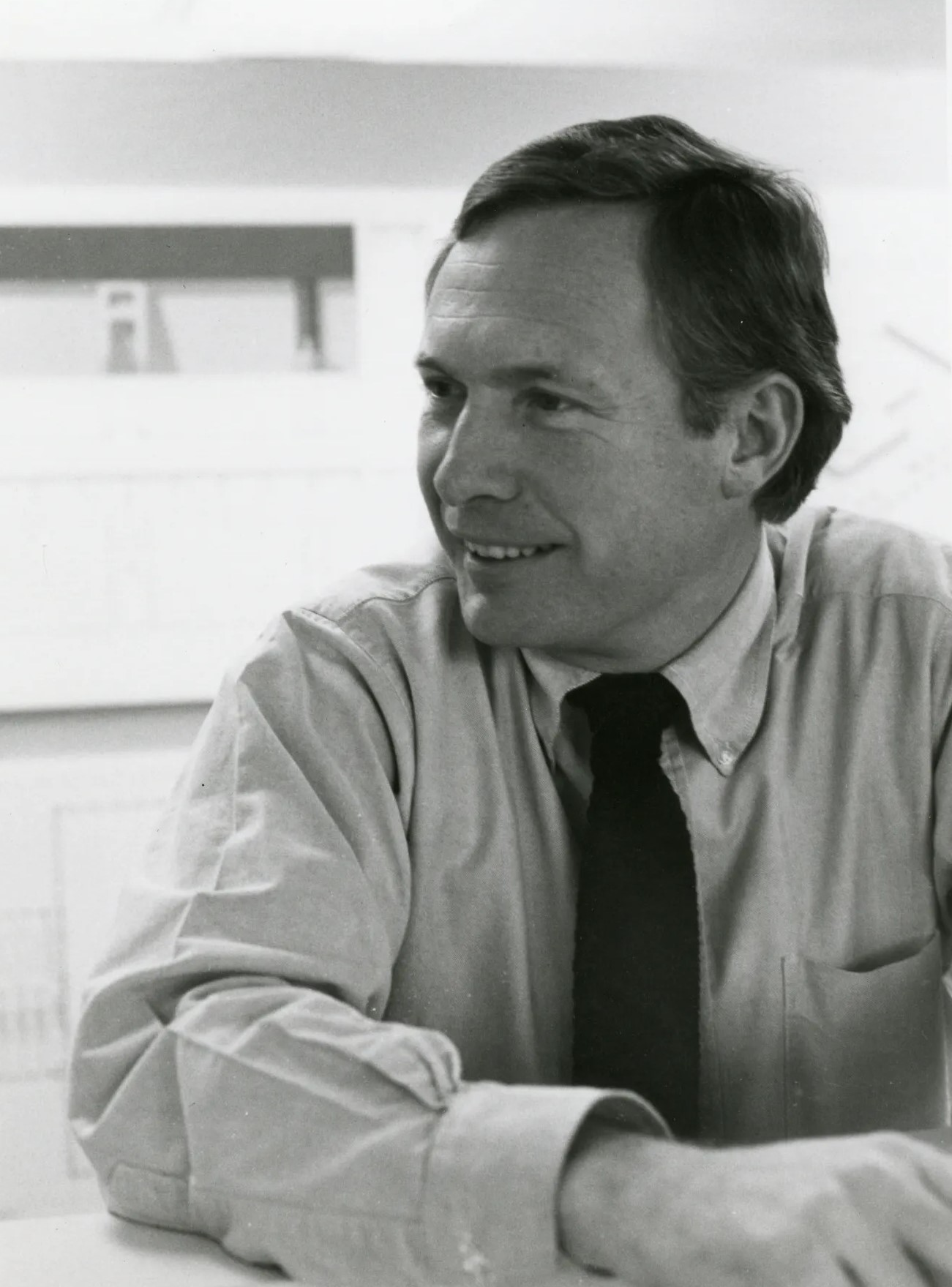
- Kahler, c. 1980s
- Born: February 14, 1937; Harrisburg, Pennsylvania, U.S.
- Died: April 14, 2026 (aged 89); Pittsboro, North Carolina, U.S.
- Education: Syracuse University; Princeton University
- Occupation: Architect
- Known for: Milwaukee Art Museum

David Kahler (February 14, 1937 – April 14, 2026) was an American architect and photographer who led the Milwaukee-based firm Kahler Slater for the bulk of his career.

Major projects designed by Kahler and his firm include the Golda Meir Library at UW–Milwaukee in 1967, two expansions to the Milwaukee Art Museum in 1975 and 2001 (the latter in collaboration with Spanish-Swiss architect Santiago Calatrava), the Haggerty Museum of Art in 1984, and the 11-year phased renovation of the Wisconsin State Capitol between 1991 and 2002.

== Life and career ==
David Truman Kahler was born on February 14, 1937, in Harrisburg, Pennsylvania, and grew up in Chadds Ford. After obtaining a Bachelor's degree from Syracuse University in 1960 and a Master's degree from Princeton University in 1962, he taught at the School of Architecture of the University of Illinois Urbana-Champaign. In 1965, he left academia to take over an architectural firm in Milwaukee. Founded in 1908 by Fitzhugh Scott (1881–1957), a protégé of architect Alexander C. Eschweiler, the company was renamed Kahler Slater after Thomas McAnarney Slater (1931–2007) joined Kahler as a partner. Fitzhugh Scott, Jr. (1910–1998), one of Scott's sons, also became an original partner in the firm.

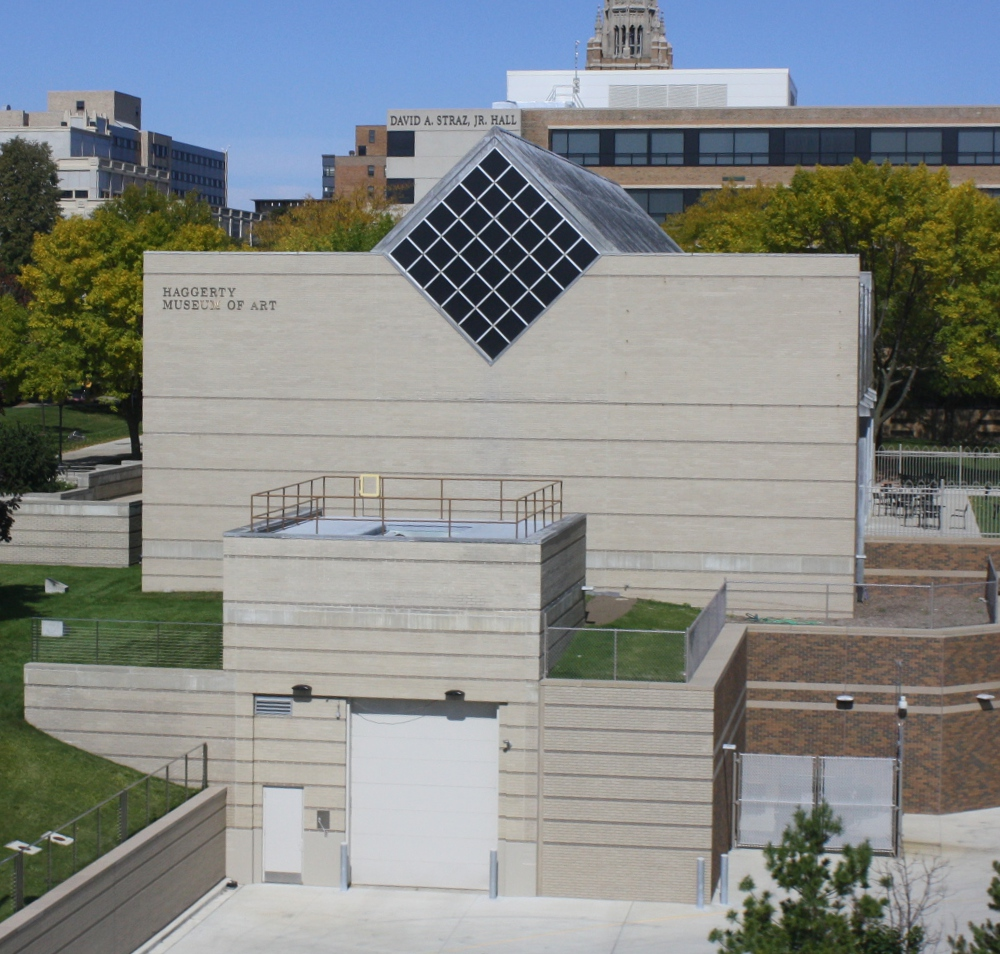
Haggerty Museum, 1984

Over the next decades, Kahler Slater was involved in a number of projects, the most significant being the first extension to the Milwaukee Art Museum in 1975, the Haggerty Museum of Art building on the campus of Marquette University, which Kahler took over from O'Neil Ford after his death in 1982, and the renovation of the Wisconsin State Capitol.

While Thomas Slater left the firm in 1996, Kahler undertook another major project: the Milwaukee Art Museum’s Quadracci Pavilion, which he helped design in collaboration with Spanish architect Santiago Calatrava. Following the completion of the building in 2001, Kahler left Milwaukee to start a consulting firm and relocated to Pittsboro, North Carolina.

In the 1950s, Kahler took up photography, focusing on the subject of railroad towns after encountering the work of O. Winston Link. The Center for Railroad Photography & Art, of which Kahler was a board member from 1997 until his death, held a retrospective of a hundred of his works in association with the Grohmann Museum in 2021. The show was presented at the O. Winston Link Museum in Roanoke, Virginia, in 2023.

Kahler died on April 14, 2026, at the age of 89.

== Bibliography ==
- Kahler, David (2021). The Railroad and the Art of Place: An Anthology. Madison, WI: Center for Railroad Photography & Art. ISBN 978-1637604960.
