= Permasteelisa Group =

International façade company

- Industry: Construction; Engineering
- Founded: 1973; 53 years ago in Vittorio Veneto, Italy
- Headquarters: Vittorio Veneto, Italy
- Area served: Worldwide
- Key people: Peter Bacon (Executive Chairman); Seb Fossey (Group CEO)
- Services: Consultancy; Design; Engineering; Maintenance; Project management; Refurbishment
- Revenue: €654 million (2025)
- Number of employees: 1,930
- Parent: Atlas Holdings
- Subsidiaries: Permasteelisa#Subsidiaries
- Website: Permasteelisa Group

Permasteelisa Group is an international contractor specialising in the design, engineering, manufacturing, installation, and maintenance of building façades. The company is particularly known for producing façades for skyscrapers, airports, retail stores and buildings in the healthcare, education and cultural sectors. Past projects include the Sydney Opera House, the Guggenheim Museum in Bilbao, The Shard in London and One World Trade Center in New York City.

The company has around 1,930 employees worldwide and operates from 23 locations across 4 continents.

As of 2026, Permasteelisa Group is active across Europe, North America, the Middle East and Asia Pacific. Alongside its curtain wall work, the company specialises in creating retail storefronts and in façade maintenance and refurbishment.

== History ==
The company was founded in 1973 in Vittorio Veneto, Italy, with the name of Infissi Serramenti Alluminio (ISA). Following the acquisition of the Australian company Permasteel Industries in 1986, which manufactured the curtain wall for the Sydney Opera House, the company's name was changed to Permasteelisa and a period of international expansion began. In 1994, Permasteelisa acquired the Dutch company Scheldebouw B.V. and in 2001 the German company Josef Gartner GmbH. The company entered the United States market at the end of the 1990s.

In 2011, Permasteelisa was acquired by Japanese Lixil Group for €575 million. It was then sold to the American private equity firm Atlas Holdings in May 2020.

In 2022, it was the first company in the world to achieve a certified Environmental Product Declaration (EPD) for a bespoke façade system, for the Nova N2 office block in London.

== Subsidiaries ==
- Benson Permasteelisa LLC
- Bleu Tech Montréal Permasteelisa Groupe (Canada)
- Josef Gartner GmbH
- Permasteelisa Australia Pty
- Permasteelisa France
- Permasteelisa Gartner Middle East LLC
- Permasteelisa Gartner Retail HK
- Permasteelisa Ireland Limited
- Permasteelisa Macau Ltd.
- Permasteelisa North America
- Permasteelisa Pacific Holdings (Singapore)
- Permasteelisa Projects (Thailand)
- Permasteelisa S.p.A.
- Permasteelisa (UK) Ltd.
- Scheldebouw B.V.

== Notable Projects ==
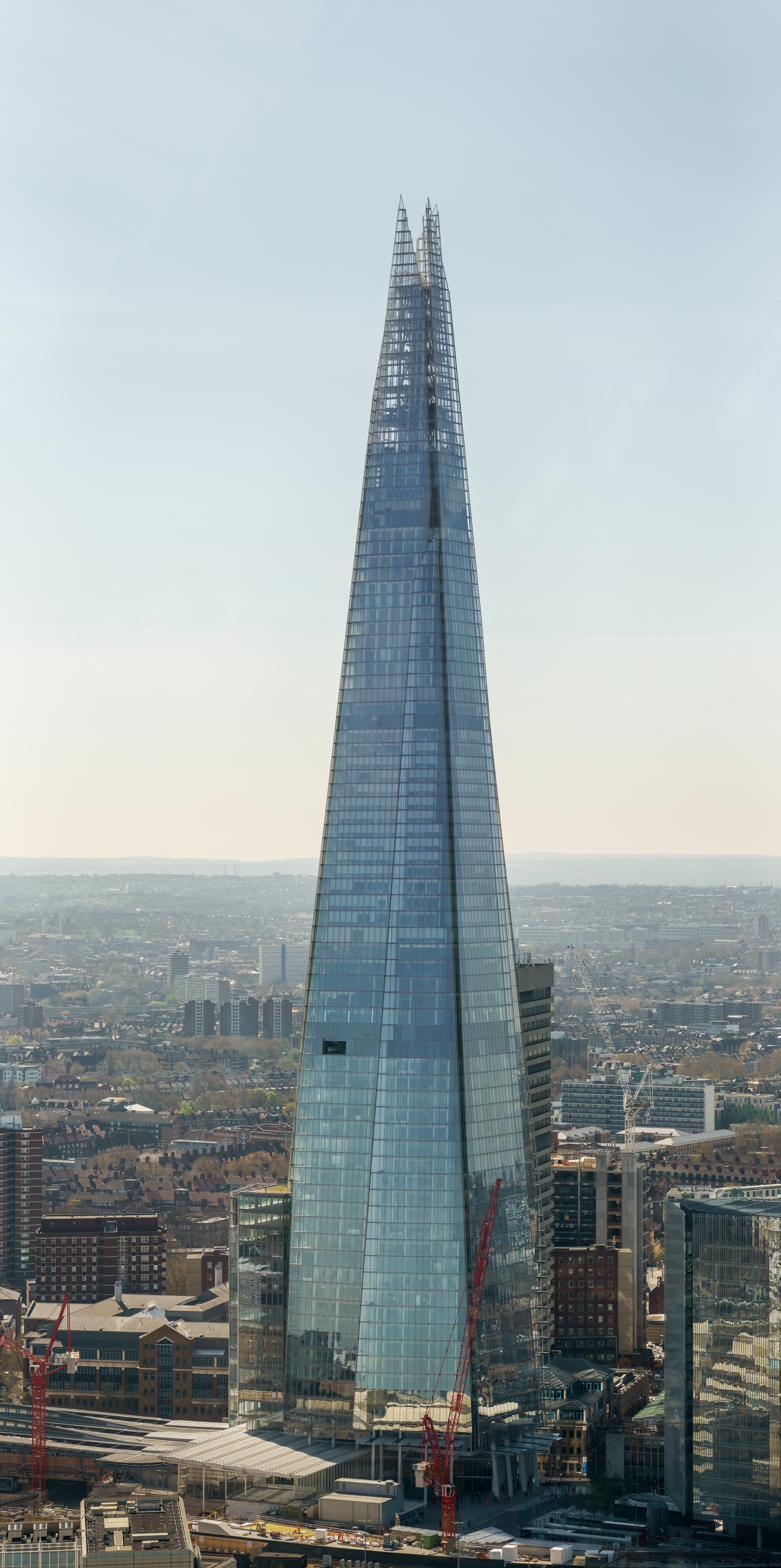
The Shard

=== Europe ===
- 8 Bishopsgate, London, UK (2023)
- 20 Fenchurch Street, London, UK (2014)
- 22 Bishopsgate, London, UK (2020)
- Commerzbank Tower, Frankfurt, Germany (1997)
- Deutsche Bank Twin Towers, Frankfurt, Germany (2011)
- EDGE East Side, Berlin, Germany (2023)
- Elbphilharmonie, Hamburg, Germany (2017)
- Guggenheim Museum, Bilbao, Spain (1997)
- Lloyd’s Building, London, UK (1986)
- MOL Campus, Budapest, Hungary (2022)
- Musée des Confluences, Lyon, France (2014)
- Cross for Sagrada Familia Tower of Jesus Christ, Barcelona, Spain (2026)
- The Scalpel, London, UK (2018)
- The Shard, London, UK (2012)
- Torre Glòries, Barcelona, Spain (2005)
- Tour Hekla, Paris, France (2022)
- Varso Tower, Warsaw, Poland (2022)
- Unicredit Tower, Milan, Italy (2012)

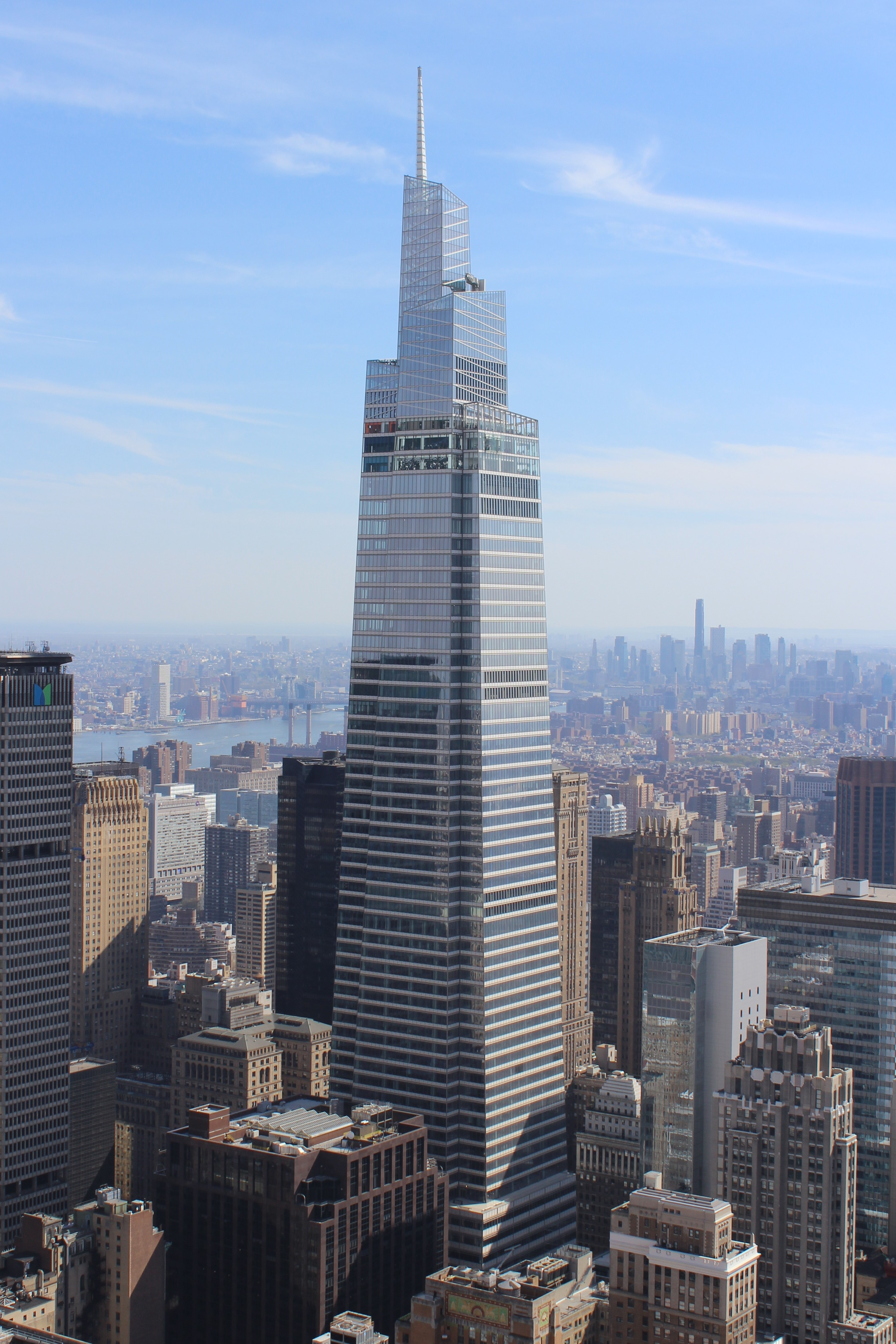
One Vanderbilt

=== North America ===
- One World Trade Center, New York City (2014)
- 3 World Trade Center, New York City (2018)
- 4 World Trade Center, New York City (2013)
- 7 World Trade Center, New York City (2006)
- 8 Spruce Street, New York City (2011)
- 425 Park Avenue, New York City (2022)
- Academy Museum of Motion Pictures, Los Angeles (2021)
- Central Park Tower, New York City (2020)
- LaGuardia Airport, New York City (2016)
- MIRA Tower, San Francisco (2022)
- The New York Times Building, New York City (2007)
- One Vanderbilt, New York City (2020)
- The Perelman Performing Arts Center, New York City (2023)
- Salesforce Tower, San Francisco (2018)
- The Spiral, New York City (2022)
- Walt Disney Concert Hall, Los Angeles (2003)
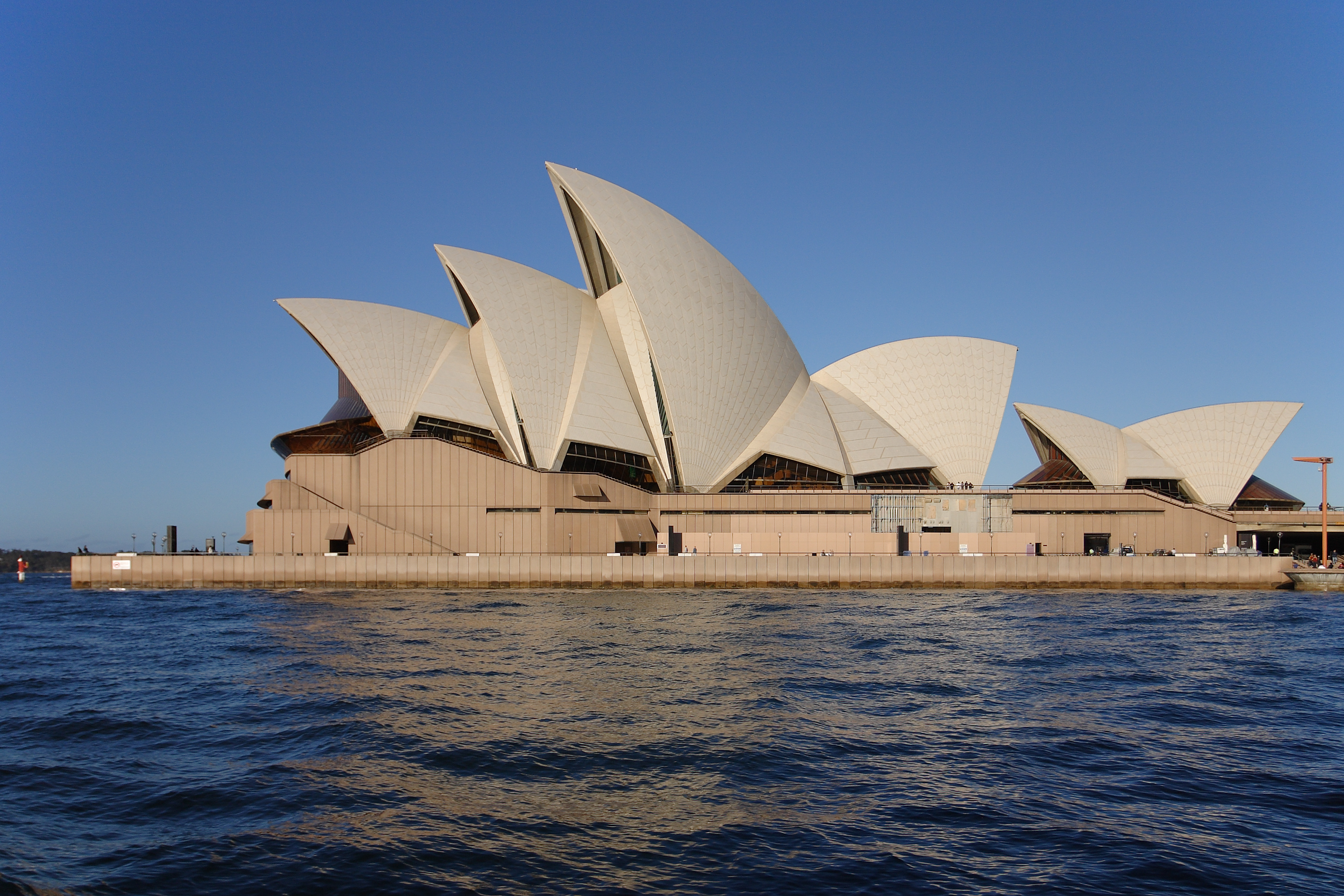
  Sydney Opera House

=== Asia Pacific ===
- 200 George Street, Sydney, Australia (2015)
- Bank of China Tower, Hong Kong, China (1990)
- Epicenter Tokyo, Japan (2003)
- Jin Mao Tower, Shanghai, China (1999)
- Louis Vuitton Maison Seoul, South Korea (2019)
- M+, Hong Kong, China (2020)
- Opus, Hong Kong, China (2012)
- Shanghai World Financial Center, PR China (2008)
- Sydney Opera House, Australia (1973)
- Taipei 101, Taiwan (2004)
- Tiffany & Co. Flagship, Beijing, China (2026)

Aldar Headquarters

=== Middle East ===
- Aldar HQ Building, Abu Dhabi, UAE (2010)
- Coca-Cola Arena, Dubai, UAE (2019)
- King Abdullah Financial District Metro Station, Riyadh, Kingdom of Saudi Arabia (2024)
- Tadawul Tower, Riyadh, Kingdom of Saudi Arabia (2022)
