= Donnelley Financial Solutions =

American financial company

Donnelley Financial Solutions, Inc.
- Type: Public
- Traded as: NYSE: DFIN; S&P 600 component
- Predecessor: R.R. Donnelley & Sons
- Founded: October 1983; 42 years ago
- Headquarters: Lancaster, PA, U.S.
- Key people: Daniel Leib (CEO); Jons Besch (COO); David Gardella (CFO)
- Revenue: ▲US$519.5 million (2021)
- Operating income: ▲US$219.3 million (2021)
- Net income: ▲US$145.9 million (2021)
- Total assets: ▲US$883.3 million (2021)
- Total equity: ▲US$377.0 million (2021)
- Number of employees: 2,185 (December 2021)
- Divisions: Global Capital Markets; Global Investment Markets
- Website: dfinsolutions.com

Donnelley Financial Solutions (DFIN) is a financial compliance company based in Chicago, Illinois, United States. The company provides software as a service (SaaS) products, software-enabled services (SeS), print, and compliance services related to US Securities and Exchange Commission regulations to companies in capital and investment markets.

The company estimated 84% of 2018 revenue coming from the United States, 6% from Europe, 6% from Asia, 3% from Canada, and 1% from the rest of the world. As of April 2019, the company had a market capitalization of $512M.

== History ==
Originally established in 1983 as the financial business unit of RR Donnelley, Donnelley Financial Solutions (DFIN) was spun off as an independent company in October 2016.

In December 2018, DFIN acquired eBrevia, a provider of artificial intelligence-based data extraction and contract analytics software.

In December 2021, DFIN acquired Guardum, a provider of data security and privacy software which has been integrated into its Venue virtual data room.

== Business Segments ==
=== Global Capital Markets (GCM) ===
DFIN's Global Capital Markets business provides software and services to corporate and financial services clients. The company's ActiveDisclosure product is used by corporate clients to create and manage SEC filings, either on an ongoing basis or in preparation for an IPO. The Venue product provides virtual dataroom services to facilitate information sharing in M&A transactions, while the eBrevia product line (acquired in December 2018) provides AI-based contract analysis. The company also owns EDGAR Online, which provides the investment community online access to the data within SEC filings. The GCM segment made up 65% of DFIN's 2018 revenue.

=== Global Investment Markets (GIM) ===
DFIN's Global Investment Markets (GIM) business provides software and services to investment management businesses, including United States based mutual funds, hedge and alternative investment funds, insurance companies and overseas investment structures for collective investments. The company also provides products to third-party service providers and custodians who support investment managers, and sells products and distribution services to broker networks and financial advisors. The company's products include FundSuiteArc, a cloud-based platform for assembling and managing information required by regulators, and Mediant, a software suite that allows brokers and financial advisors to monitor and manage shareholder communications. The GIM segment made up 35% of the company's 2018 revenue.
