= Greenidge Generation power plant =

Coordinates: 42°40′46″N 76°56′54″W

Greenidge Generation is a natural gas power plant in Dresden, New York. It is used to power a bitcoin mining operation.

In 2014, Atlas Holdings bought the power station. Atlas converted the plant from coal to natural gas in 2016.

In 2022, the New York Department of Environmental Conservation denied an air permit to the plant claiming that its greenhouse gas emissions violated New York state's climate goals.

In 2024 New York State Supreme Court judge ruled against the Department of Environmental Conservation.

== See also ==
- Environmental impact of bitcoin
