= 191 North Wacker =

Office skyscraper in Chicago, Illinois

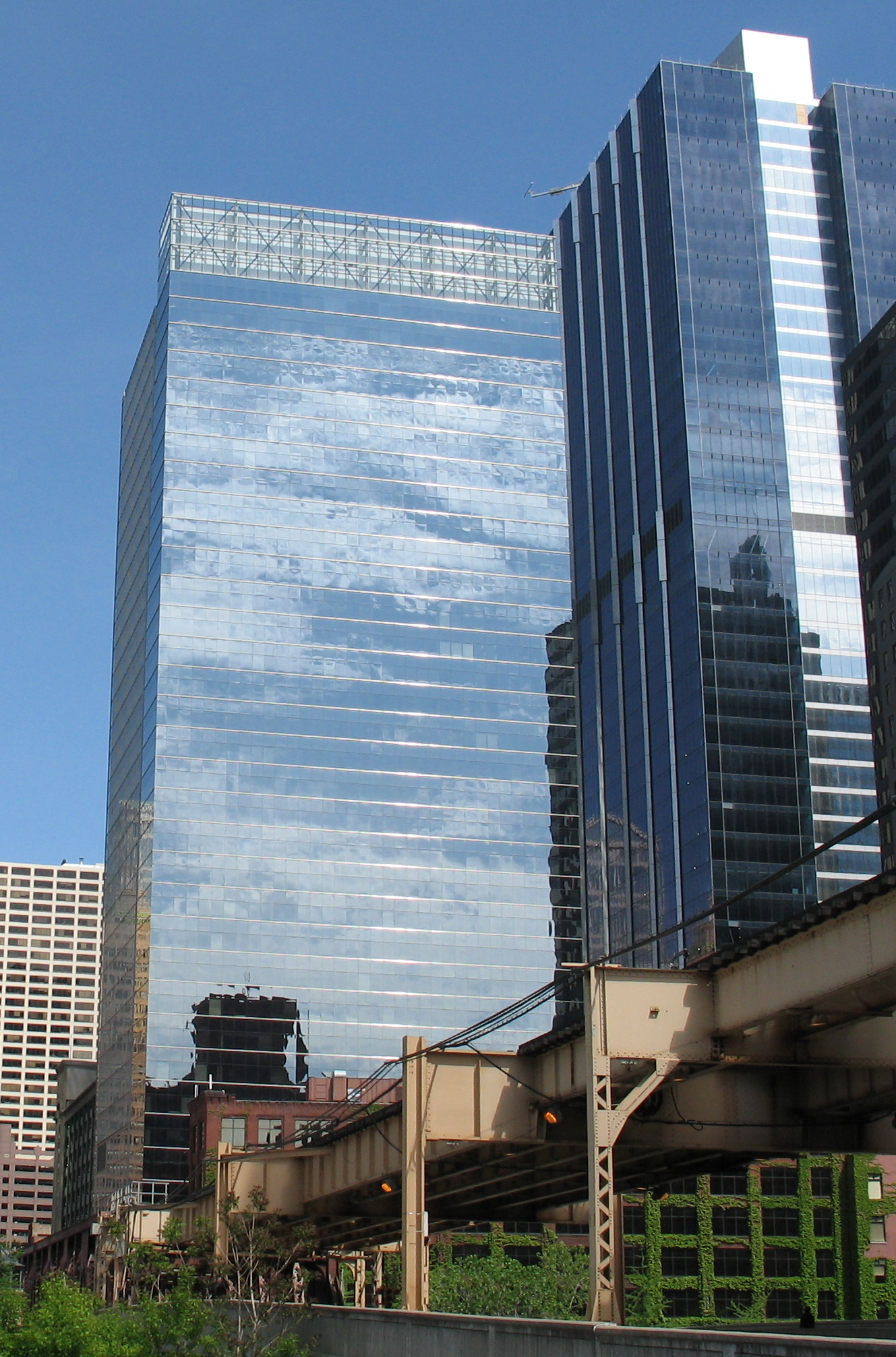
- Interactive map of the 191 North Wacker area

General information
- Type: Office
- Location: 191 North Wacker Drive, Chicago, Illinois
- Coordinates: 41.8854°N 87.6365°W
- Construction started: 2000
- Completed: 2002

Height
- Roof: 516 ft (157 m)

Technical details
- Floor count: 37
- Floor area: 737,759 ft^{2} (68,540.1 m^{2})
- Lifts/elevators: 14

Design and construction
- Architect: Kohn Pedersen Fox

191 North Wacker is a 516 ft (157m) tall skyscraper in Chicago, Illinois. It was constructed from 2000 to 2002 and has 37 floors, 14 elevators, and 737,759 square feet of floor space. Kohn Pedersen Fox Associates designed the building, which is the 77th tallest in Chicago. Tenants include LSC Communications.

== See also ==
- List of tallest buildings in Chicago
