= RR Donnelley =

American printing and communications company

R.R. Donnelley & Sons Company
- Company type: Private
- Industry: Commercial printing, Logistics and Supply chain, Digital marketing
- Founded: 1864; 162 years ago
- Headquarters: 227 W Monroe St Suite 500; Chicago, Illinois, 60606; United States
- Key people: Thomas Quinlan (CEO)
- Revenue: US$5.37 billion (2022)
- Net income: US$161.4 million (2022)
- Owner: Chatham Asset Management
- Number of employees: >35,000 (2025)
- Website: www.rrd.com

R.R. Donnelley & Sons Co. (styled RR Donnelley) or RRD is an American integrated communications company that provides marketing and business communications, commercial printing, and related services. Its corporate headquarters are located in Chicago, Illinois, United States. In 2007, R.R. Donnelley was the world's largest commercial printer. In 2021, it was referred to as North America's largest.

== History ==
=== Early history ===
R.R. Donnelley & Sons Company was founded in Chicago in 1864 by Richard Robert Donnelley. His son, Reuben H. Donnelley, founded the otherwise unrelated company formerly known as R. H. Donnelley. Richard Robert Donnelley established his company in downtown Chicago, which in 1870 became the Lakeside Printing and Publishing Company (and later Donnelley, Loyd & Company). During the 1870s the company published the Lakeside Library book series. The Great Chicago Fire of 1871 destroyed Donnelley's business, but quickly re-established operations after rebuilding. After a series of reorganizations and expansions, Donnelley built the Lakeside Press Building on Plymouth Court, and in 1902 began construction of the R.R. Donnelley and Sons Co. Calumet Plant on 21st Street and Calumet Avenue. The company aimed to produce books and periodicals with impressive modern design and mass printed commercial and reference materials. Lakeside Press produced Encyclopædia Britannica, Time Magazine, Life Magazine, promotional literature for the Model T Ford, catalogs for Sears Roebuck, among others. The Press produced high quality collectible editions for the Chicago Caxton Club and the Limited Editions Club. Donnelley was the official printer for the 1933–1934 World's Fair, "A Century of Progress", which took place on the Lake Michigan lakefront just to the east of the plant. The company designed and printed official tickets, postcards, posters, brochures, and magazines which displayed the company's distinctive modernist design. " The company eventually became a global provider of printing and print-related services. From 1922 to 1945, the Director of Design and Typography was William A. Kittredge, who commissioned other well-regarded artists and designers, such as Rudolph Ruzicka, Edward A. Wilson, and W.A. Dwiggins.

=== The Four American Books Campaign ===
Donnelley launched a "Four American Books" campaign in 1926 which culminated with their publication in 1930. The aim was to establish that the company's modern commercial machinery could produce illustrated books to rival high-quality presses in Europe and to establish a reputation as a printer of fine trade editions in order to enter the mass-market book industry. The choice of American authors reflected a growing pride in and market for American literature. C. G. Littell, vice president and treasurer, and William A. Kittredge, head of the department of design and typography, organized the campaign.

Kittredge approached William Addison Dwiggins, who was a well-established designer of magazine and newspaper advertisements. After he turned down several suggestions, Dwiggins agreed to illustrate the Tales of Edgar Allan Poe. The Press considered his fee of $2,000 low for an illustrator of his commercial power. Edward A. Wilson illustrated Richard Henry Dana's mid-19th century sea-adventure Two Years Before the Mast and Rudolph Ruzicka Henry David Thoreau's Walden.

The best known of the publications in the series was Rockwell Kent's edition of Herman Melville's novel, Moby-Dick, which at that point was not yet accepted as an American classic. Kittredge commissioned Kent to perform the design and illustrations in 1926, and the book appeared four years later in a three-volume limited edition of one-thousand copies issued in an aluminum slipcase. Kittredge called it "the greatest book done in this generation" and declared that "we will all go jump in the lake" if "it is not the greatest illustrated book ever done in America." (In fact, the book is considered one of the finest of the 20th century.) Random House quickly issued a one-volume trade edition, which was also printed by Lakeside Press, bound in black cloth with silver print and decorations. The book's cover and the first advertisements both featured Kent's name but did not mention Melville's. Kent's design, especially in the Modern Library edition of 1943, helped the novel to find a wider audience.

Kent's illustrations give the impression of being woodcuts but are in fact ink and wash. Kent counselled Kittredge that the "whole book is a work that should be read slowly, reflectively; the large page and type induce such reading. The character of the type should be homely, rather than refined and elegant, for homeliness flavors every line that Melville wrote." He wrote that he had thought of using a fourteen-point Caslon type-face, and he did make the pages rather large. The artist considered his illustrations "literary woodcutting, not engraving", and added that the illustrations show the "midnight darkness enveloping human existence, the darkness of the human soul, the abyss, -- such is the mood of Moby-Dick." In 1992, the Library of Congress held an exhibition devoted to the Four American Classics series.

=== Late 20th century ===
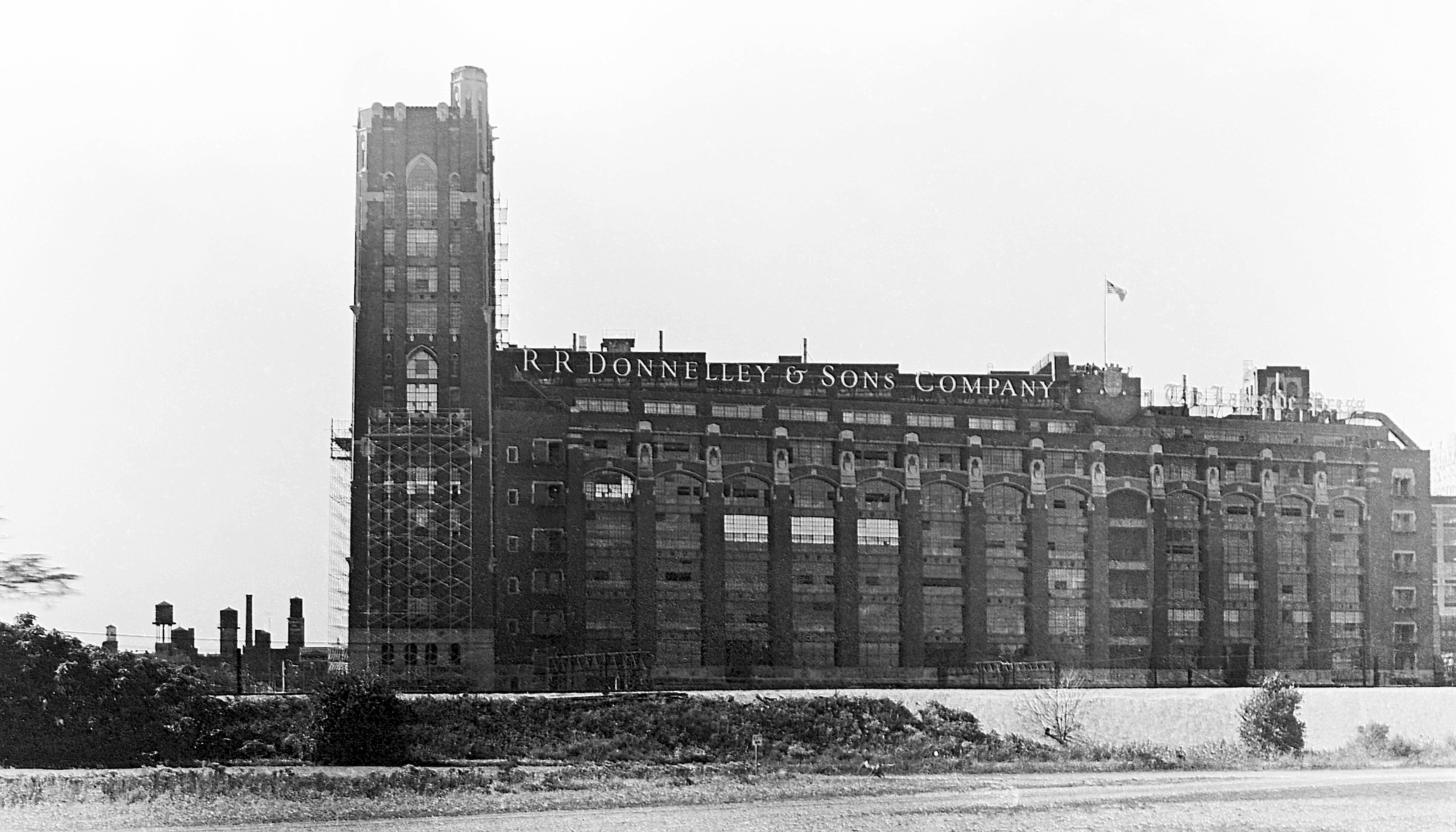
RR Donnelley building in Chicago in 1978

R.R. Donnelley's cartographic production facility grew to be one of the largest custom mapmaking companies in the United States. In the early 1990s, the division successfully integrated routing technology with its digital map databases and launched a separate company, Geosystems, which several years later became MapQuest.

The Calumet Plant was closed in 1993, following the cancellation of the Sears catalog. Donnelley's handling of the closing generated a lawsuit, which went all the way to the US Supreme Court, concerning alleged discrimination against black employees. Donnelley settled the lawsuit in 2003.

=== 21st century ===
Throughout its history, particularly in the 1990s and 2000s, R.R. Donnelley purchased a number of other companies outright, steadily increasing in size. In February 2004, R.R. Donnelley merged with Moore Wallace Inc., keeping the name R.R. Donnelley as the name of the combined company. Donnelley went on to purchase OfficeTiger, a major publishing and financial outsourcing company, as well as printing company Banta Corporation in 2007.

In 2005, it acquired Hong Kong based Asia Printers Group from CVC Capital Partners. Asia Printers Group consists of South China Printing, which was acquired by Asia Printers Group in 2002.

In 2006, it acquired Canadian Bank Note Company's financial printing business, consisting of documentation for initial public offerings.

In May 2007, R.R. Donnelley also acquired book and educational materials printer Von Hoffmann (and creative/ pre-press subsidiary Anthology Inc.) from Visant Corporation. R.R. Donnelley also purchased Perry Judd's Holdings Inc., a private catalog and magazine printer, at the beginning of 2007. Also in 2007, R.R. Donnelley was also named as an interested party in an attempt to purchase Quebecor World. In May 2009, the company tendered an unsolicited bid to purchase Quebecor World.

At the beginning of 2008, RRD also announced the acquisition of Pro Line Printing, Inc. In July 2008, the company established a multi-year contract with F+W Publications Inc., which allowed Donnelley to print a large amount of F + W's book and magazine publications. The contract was valued at about $80 million.

In 2010 and 2011, R.R. Donnelley acquired Bowne & Co., San Francisco-based Nimblefish Technologies, Helium.com, and Austin-based LibreDigital. During the Labor Day weekend in September 2011, R.R. Donnelley announced it would close its Bloomsburg printing plant where Penguin Classics and paperbacks in the best-selling Twilight and Idiot's Guide series were printed.

In March 2012, RR Donnelley closed their plant in Windsor, Connecticut and in May of the same year, the company closed their plant in Danbury, Connecticut. On August 15, 2012, R.R. Donnelley acquired EDGAR Online.

In 2013, R.R. Donnelley acquired Consolidated Graphics.

In August 2015, the company announced it would split into three different companies. One would keep the name R.R. Donnelley & Sons whereas the other two would be titled LSC Communications and Donnelley Financial Solutions. The separation was completed in October 2016.

The company left the Brazilian market in 2019.

In September 2021, R.R. Donnelley announced it would be closing the company's plant in Lewisburg in November 2021. In October 2021, R.R. Donnelley announced that it had entered into a definitive agreement to be acquired by Chatham Asset Management for $7.50 per share in cash. After a bidding war with Atlas Holdings, Chatham increased their offer to buy R.R. Donnelley's remaining shares for $10.85 per share in cash, for a value of nearly $900 million. The acquisition completed in February 2022.

In July 2024, R.R. Donnelley finalized the acquisition of digital print and marketing businesses from Vericast Corp. Also in 2024, R.R. Donnelley acquired Williams Lea.

== Lakeside Press ==
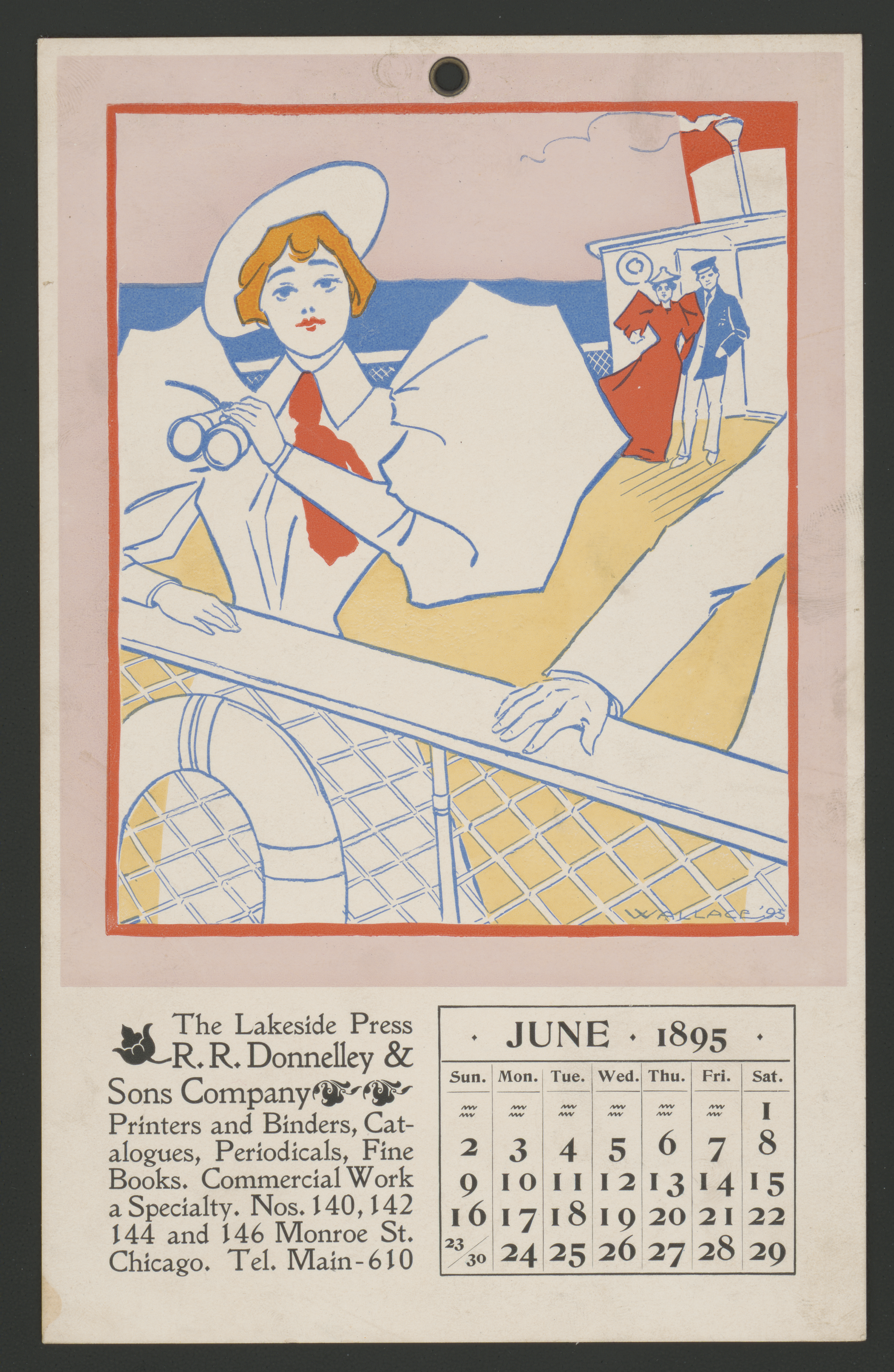
Lakeside Press 1895 calendar

Lakeside Press was a Chicago publishing imprint established in the 19th century under which the R.R. Donnelley Company produced fine-quality books as well as mail order catalogs, telephone directories, encyclopedias, and advertising. The Press was best known for its high quality editions for the Chicago Caxton Club as well as the Lakeside Classics, a series of fine reprints produced annually, at Christmas time, by R.R. Donnelley. The Lakeside Classics tradition began in 1903 by Thomas E. Donnelley, who was then the company president. The basic format of these books has remained essentially the same since inception, as a hardcover, cloth wrapped and gold embossed. Subject matter tended to cover elements of American history. Many early volumes contained speeches and writings of noted Americans, including Benjamin Franklin, whose autobiography was published as the first Lakeside Classic.

=== Lakeside Classics ===
Lakeside Classics is a series started in 1903 that reprinted neglected classic works. Thomas E. Donnelley, then president of the company, was impressed by a set of seven razors presented to him by one of the company's suppliers, and wanted to create a gift that would similarly represent his own company's product and could not be purchased on the open market. The company did not sell the books to the public, but gave each of the company employees a copy at Christmas, making the series valued collector's items.

Thomas Donnelley wrote in the introduction to Autobiography of Benjamin Franklin, the first volume in the series, that "If, in a modest way this volume conveys the idea that machine-made books are not a crime against art, and that books may be plain but good, and good though not costly, its mission has been accomplished." Following volumes featured speeches and writings of noted Americans, then in the 1910s selections turned to first-person narratives of American history, especially those which were rare or out of print. Themes included the Civil War, the Old West, exploration and frontier life. In the 1990s, several changes were introduced. Partly to acknowledge the company's global markets, narratives by Americans abroad were included.

An early admirer wrote in 1923 that the printing, binding, and finishings were all done by the apprentice class to "illustrate the ideals of a well-made book", and that "not only are these books well made, but they contain historical works, autobiographies, and early travels unforgettable to him who loves this fair land." He concluded that the series is becoming "an institution near and dear to the collector of books of intrinsic value and beauty."

Minor design changes were made occasionally and a major redesign every quarter century. In 1995, the date line on the title page was changed from "Christmas" to "December". For the redesign in 2003, Bruce Campbell, known for his work on The Library of America, was engaged. Among other changes, the gold-framing on the cover was restored and the typeface was changed from Bulmer to Garamond

The company did not keep detailed records on how many copies were printed. The preface to the 1935 volume says that the print run for the first volume was 1,500 copies, but no further information was included in later editions. In the 1970s printings were in the tens of thousands. The hardest volume to find is the 1904 Inaugural Addresses of the Presidents, Washington to Lincoln. It is not known whether the run was smaller or whether collectors of Washington and Lincoln have kept them off the market by retaining them. The second scarcest is Fruits of Solitude, which may have been easy to lose because it had the fewest pages. The difficulty of finding the volume Memorable Speeches led one family member to joke that the speeches were so unmemorable that everyone threw them out. The Chicago publisher Reilly & Britton was given rights to reissue some of the earliest titles as “The Patriotic Classics.”

By 2015, the series included 113 volumes. In 2017, publication was taken over by newly created company LSC Communications, and the final edition was published in 2019, with 117 total editions produced.

Lakeside Classics were not sold to the public and only made available to employees, clients and others associated with R.R. Donnelley (and later LSC Communications). The week before Christmas, each employee was given one copy of that year's volume. As such, some of the volumes have become scarce, and are in demand on the collectors' market. Antiquarian bookstores often have a section devoted to Lakeside Classics, and early volumes command large sums from book collectors.

=== Lakeside Press Apprentice School ===
In 1908 T.E. Donnelley, son of the founder, opened the Lakeside Press Apprentice School, to professionalize its workforce and ensure high-quality craftsmanship. This initiative was among the earliest structured industrial training programs. Donnelley, a Yale graduate and a trustee of the University of Chicago, felt that the recent revival of the ancient practice of apprenticeship was unsatisfactory because unions dominated the rules. He was determined to open a program modeled on the apprentice training program at the Chaix Printing Company in Paris, France, which combined instruction and practical experience. "The whole plant", in the words of one official description, "is the laboratory of the school" The inscription for the 1913 handbook for apprentices stated that "The employer should realize that engaging an apprentice is a much more important task than hiring a journeyman." The company was one of many which at the time offered apprenticeship courses of this type, ranging from the American Bridge Company and the American Locomotive Company to the Winchester Repeating Arms Company. In the early years, 90 percent of the company's executives and supervisors were graduates of the Apprentice Training School and were either college graduates who had gone through a training program or had come up through the ranks. The firm's turnover remained low. Declining fortunes led to layoffs and contention, and the school closed in 1993.

=== Lakeside Press Galleries ===
In 1929, the company opened the Lakeside Galleries on the eighth floor of their newly completed building on 22nd Street. From 1930 to 1961, when the corporate headquarters were moved, the galleries devoted exhibitions to the works of American and European artists and photographers, as well as to typography and book design.

== Publications ==
- Davis, Carl Dewitt (1922). A Study of the School for Apprentices of the Lakeside Press. R. R. Donnelley & sons Company.
- Reuben H. Donnelley Corporation (1933). Official pictures of a Century of Progress exposition. Photographs by Kaufmann & Fabry co., official photographers (PDF). Chicago.
- Donnelley, R.R. and Sons Company (1915). Rules for Compositors. R.R. Donnelley & Sons Company.
- Lakeside Press (1913). The School for Apprentices of the Lakeside Press. R.R. Donnelley & Sons Company.
- The Lakeside Press (PDF). Chicago: R.R. Donnelley. 1933.
