= Harry V. Quadracci =

American businessman (1936–2002)

Harry Virgil Quadracci (January 10, 1936 – July 29, 2002) was an American businessman and philanthropist who co-founded Quad/Graphics with his wife, Elizabeth Quadracci. He was influenced by his father, Harry R. Quadracci, a founding partner of the Milwaukee-based W.A. Krueger Printing Company. He followed in his father’s footsteps, starting his career at W.A. Krueger before establishing his own venture.

== Work at Krueger ==
Quadracci worked at W.A.Krueger, but eventually left when a managerial disagreement led to a strike. He was not included when the president of the company reached a settlement, and he felt the negotiating was done behind his back. He interpreted it as a signal that he would not eventually fulfill the role as president of the company. He then left to form his own company.

== Company beginnings ==
Quadracci leased a 20,000 square foot building in Pewaukee, Wisconsin. By 1974 the company had 35 employees.

== Contract ==
In 1977, Quadracci was able to land Newsweek, and in 2000 landed National Geographic.

== Philanthropy ==
In 2001, Harry V. Quadracci and his wife Elizabeth Quadracci helped finance the addition to the Milwaukee Art Museum designed by Santiago Calatrava. The Quadraccis donated $10 million in a donation-matching challenge they spearheaded. The addition was named the Quadracci Pavilion.

== Death ==
Quadracci died at 66 years old at Pine Lake in Chenequa, Wisconsin. He suffered from an unknown medical incident which resulted in him drowning. Wisconsin probate case has his date of birth listed as January not June.

== Memorial ==
In his memorial Quad/Graphics donated 1 million dollars to Waukesha County Technical College and named a newer area of the school the Harry V. Quadracci Printing and Graphics Center.

The $1 million gift came from Quad/Graphics clients, friends, vendors, and employees who donated to the Harry V. Quadracci Memorial Fund. The contributions totalled $500,000, and then were matched by Quad/Graphics' Windhover Foundation for a total gift of $1 million.
