= Atlas Holdings =

American private equity business

Atlas Holdings LLC
- Type: Private
- Industry: Investment management
- Founded: 2002; 24 years ago
- Founders: Andrew Bursky; Tim Fazio
- Headquarters: Greenwich, Connecticut, US
- Key people: Andrew Bursky (managing partner); Tim Fazio (managing partner); Jacob Hudson (managing partner)
- Website: atlasholdingsllc.com

Atlas Holdings LLC is an American private equity firm focused on controlling investments in manufacturing and distribution industries.

== History ==
The company was founded in Greenwich, Connecticut, by Andrew Bursky and Tim Fazio in 2002. It announced the acquisition of a portfolio of 23 industrial properties located in the United States for $300 million in January 2024.

In April 2025, Atlas submitted a bid to acquire De La Rue in an offer that valued the company at £263 million. The offer was agreed by the board of De La Rue and later completed on July 1, 2025.

In September 2025, Atlas agreed to take the parent company of Office Depot and Office Max private in a deal valued at approximately $1 billion. In December 2025, it was announced Atlas Holdings had completed its acquisition.

In early 2026, Atlas pitched to buy UK-based construction materials supplier Brickability whose management rejected the bid saying it undervalued the business – a view disputed by Atlas. Discussions ended in April 2026.

== Investments ==
As of July 2025, the company is reported to own 27 manufacturing and distribution businesses including Bovis, De La Rue, Foster Farms, Greenidge Generation, Herff Jones, LSC Communications, Permasteelisa, and Rehau Automotive.
