= Milwaukee Magazine =

American monthly magazine

- Cover for the August 2020 issue
- Categories: City magazine
- Frequency: Monthly
- Founded: 1983
- Company: Quad
- Country: United States
- Based in: Milwaukee, Wisconsin
- Language: English
- Website: milwaukeemag.com
- ISSN: 0741-1243
- OCLC: 10102193

Milwaukee Magazine is a monthly city magazine serving the Milwaukee metropolitan area in Wisconsin, United States. It bills itself as "Southeastern Wisconsin's most authoritative source for Events and Dining," and reports a readership of 200,000.

== History and profile ==
A magazine named Milwaukee (sometimes Milwaukee, the metropolitan magazine) was established in 1977 (ISSN 0746-3790), and its final edition (volume 8, issue 4) was published in May 1983. It was continued by Milwaukee Magazine (ISSN 0741-1243), which designated its first edition, published in June 1983, as volume 8, issue 5. Its office is located in the Historic Third Ward neighborhood of downtown Milwaukee. It is printed by its parent company, Quad, and is a member of the City and Regional Magazine Association (CRMA). The magazine is the recipient of various awards for its design and editorials.
