= Quad (company) =

Marketing company

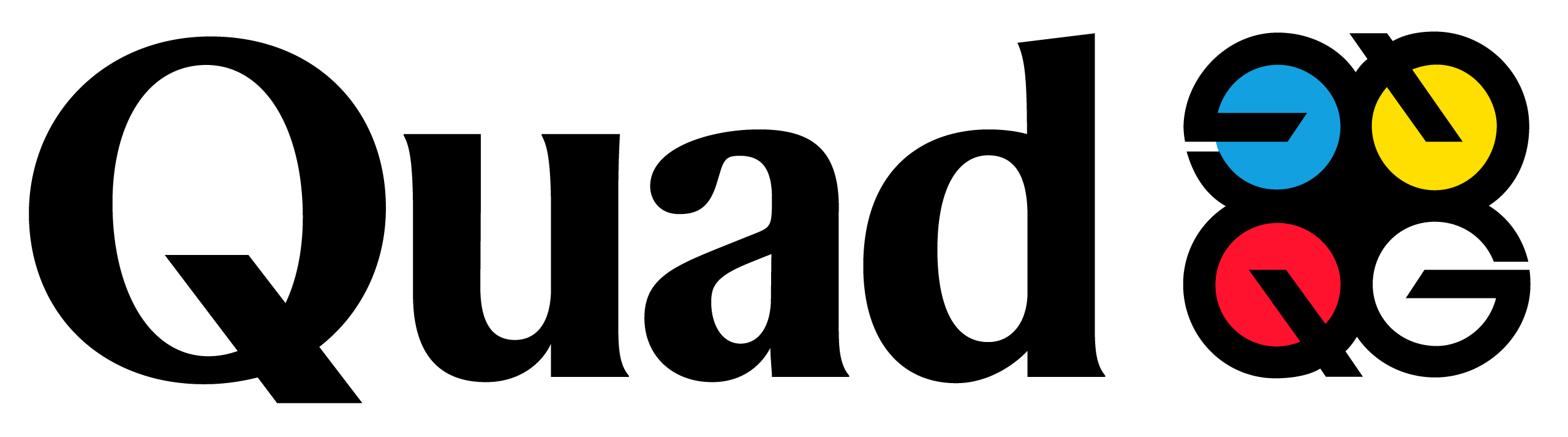
- Type: Public
- Traded as: NYSE: QUAD (Class A); Russell 2000 Component
- Industry: Marketing & Advertising, Manufacturing
- Founded: 1971
- Founder: Harry V. Quadracci
- Headquarters: Sussex, Wisconsin, United States
- Key people: Joel Quadracci, Chairman and CEO
- Services: Marketing services and agency services
- Revenue: 2.4B Revenue (2025)
- Number of employees: 10,100 employees worldwide (2025)
- Website: quad.com

Quad is an American marketing services company headquartered in Sussex, Wisconsin. It provides a range of print and marketing services that support physical and digital media channels through audience targeting services, omnichannel media planning and placement, creative and content production, retail display and packaging, postal optimization, and consumer analytics. In 2025, Quad ranked as one of the largest agency companies in the U.S. and as one of the largest commercial printers in North America.

Harry V. Quadracci founded Quad on July 13, 1971, as a privately owned printing company. In 2025, Quad had 33 manufacturing and distribution facilities and 50 client-based on-site locations. In 2025, Quad had approximately 10,000 employees around the world and approximately 2,100 clients.

Quad’s initial public offering was on July 6, 2010. It is traded on the New York Stock Exchange under the ticker symbol QUAD. The company reported $2.4 billion in net sales in 2025.

== History ==
=== Founding and first national contracts ===
Harry V. Quadracci founded Quad, originally named Quad/Graphics, on July 13, 1971, in an abandoned Pewaukee, Wisconsin, factory. He raised the funds to establish the printing company, in part, by taking out a $35,000 second mortgage on his house, and began with 11 employees. Some of the company's first contracts were with Investor magazine and the national Fishing Facts magazine. By 1973, Quad had 25 employees and $2.8 million in sales.

In 1973, Quad founded its first division, Duplainville Transport. It continues to operate as Quad’s trucking division. Over the next few years, Quad continued to grow and had 100 workers and three presses by 1976, and 300 workers and six presses in 1979.

In the late 1970s, Quad was awarded its first substantial national contract with Newsweek. Contracts with Harper's, Time, and US News & World Report followed.

=== Publishing growth ===
By the mid-1990s, the company was printing magazines like People, Sports Illustrated, Playboy, Architectural Digest, and catalogs for LL Bean and Lands' End. In 1991, Quad had almost 9,000 employees and annual sales of $509 million. In 2000, Quad acquired the contract to print National Geographic, producing 9 million copies of the magazine monthly.

In 2002, Tom Quadracci took over as company president and CEO after the death of his brother Harry. The company had around 14,000 employees, $2 billion in annual sales, and 15 plants on three continents. It was the largest privately owned printing company in the world. In 2004, Tom took over as chairman and CEO, and, in 2006, Joel Quadracci, Harry’s son, was promoted to president and COO.

=== New York Stock Exchange ===
On July 6, 2010, Quad began trading on the New York Stock Exchange (NYSE: QUAD) following the acquisition of Canadian rival World Color Press in an all-stock deal worth between $1.3 billion and $1.4 billion. Quad’s listing was not an IPO because it was not done in order to raise cash, but instead was necessary to complete a stock exchange with World Color as part of the acquisition.

Quad is still controlled by the Quadracci family through ownership of high-voting class B shares.

=== Expansion to marketing and business services ===
In 2010, Quad became LL Bean’s exclusive provider for studio photography. The company managed studio operations in cooperation with LL Bean’s Photography Operations and Creative Department. The agreement covered photography for LL Bean’s catalogs, including Men’s, Women’s, Kid’s, Fly Fishing, Hunting, Traveler, and Home titles, as well as its websites and e-commerce business.

By 2016, Quad, continuing to expand its marketing services, had built a $200 million packaging company and added offerings for in-store displays. BlueSoho, initially formed in 2004 as a digital art and image retouching studio, was repositioned in 2015 with the addition of a mobile marketing agency and media planning and placement group. Quad reported $4.3 billion in net sales in 2016.

In September 2017, Quad won a $450 million contract to print all of Bluestem Brands' catalogs. In 2019, Quad began producing 100% of Condé Nast’s titles, expanding a previous partnership that began in 1993. Publications under the partnership included Allure, Architectural Digest, Domino, Golf Digest, GQ, GQ Style, Teen Vogue, W Magazine, Wired, Bon Appétit, Condé Nast Traveler, Glamour, Vanity Fair, Vogue, Brides, and The New Yorker.

In 2018, Quad further expanded its capabilities through the acquisition of Ivie & Associates, a Texas-based marketing production services and marketing execution company that had dedicated teams located on-site at client locations. That same year, Quad gained a majority interest in Rise Interactive, a Chicago-based digital marketing agency. One year later, Quad completed the acquisition of Periscope, a creative agency headquartered in Minneapolis, Minnesota.

In February 2019, Quad announced a name and logo update, changing its name from Quad/Graphics to Quad. This was in an effort to focus more on the company’s marketing services. The company is still known as Quad/Graphics, Inc., legally.

In February 2021, Joel Quadracci testified before a Congressional committee about the need for major reforms in the U.S. Postal Service. Quadracci spoke both as the CEO of Quad and on behalf of the Coalition for a 21st Century Postal Service. It was the fourth time in a decade that Quadracci testified before Congress about the Postal Service.

In 2021, Quad expanded its relationship with Package InSight, an organization that uses biometric technology to study brand packaging performance, consumer attention, and shelf-impact. In 2024, Package InSight’s Consumer Research Labs expanded inside Quad’s Marketing Experience Innovation in West Allis, Wisconsin, to let brands test packages and research the reactions and preferences of real shoppers in mock retail environments.

In 2022, Quad’s creative agency launched Favorite Child as its brand design house, which offers design strategy, brand identity, packaging and retail design services. Favorite Child supports brands such as Titleist and Aldi.

In 2024, Quad launched a new creative agency named Betty, in honor of the late Betty Quadracci. This new entity consolidates Quad's creative capabilities, including the creative and content production agency brands Ivie & Associates Inc. and Periscope.

Additionally, in 2024, Quad introduced InStore Connect, an in-store retail media network technology. Partnering with The Save Mart Companies, the initial rollout of this technology will be across 15 stores. Since its launch, Quad has added other retailers, including Homeland Stores and Vallarta Supermarkets.

== Services ==
Quad offers marketing and print services and products. These services include:

- Campaign planning
- Marketing outsourcing
- Production service outsourcing
- Intelligence
- Data and analytics
- Technology services
- Media services
- Creative and content services
- Managed services
- Execution in non-print channels (broadcast and digital)
- In-store marketing and promotion
- Print execution and logistics
- Sourcing and procurement

In 2023, Quad released a new campaign, “Built on Quad”. This was the company’s first large-scale marketing and advertising campaign focused on Quad’s “end-to-end” services and products.

== Operations ==
At the end of 2025, Quad had 33 manufacturing and distribution facilities and 50 client-based on-site locations.

In 2023, Quad had over 2,700 clients and 13,000 employees. Around 1,500 Quad employees are based in marketing departments in client companies. Clients include Cabela’s, Safeway, Vons, and Shaw’s.

=== Culture ===
In February 2021, Quad and the Quadracci family's Windhover Foundation committed $1 million to a three-year partnership with The BrandLab, a non-profit organization that supports young people from diverse backgrounds to advance in the marketing industry.

In 1990, Harry V. Quadracci founded QuadMed to improve the quality and cost-effectiveness of employee healthcare, serving as a provider of onsite primary care services to employees and their families. Today QuadMed provides workplace health services for employers across the country. Onsite services include physical therapy and condition management programs for conditions such as diabetes and asthma.

=== People ===
Joel Quadracci is the Chairman and CEO of Quad. Between 2020 and 2023, Quad hired Julie Currie (formerly Nielsen Company) as Executive Vice President and Chief Revenue Officer, Josh Golden (formerly Ad Age) as Chief Marketing Officer, Joshua Lowcock (formerly IPG-owned UM Worldwide) as President of Quad Media, and Tim Maleeny (formerly Havas) as Chief Client Strategy and Integration Officer and President of Quad Agency Solutions.

In 2023, Quad appointed Beth-Ann Eason to its board of directors and Compensation Committee. In October, Quad appointed Melanie Huet as a board member. Huet is President of Brand Management & Innovation and a member of the Executive Committee at Newell Brands, a consumer products company.

== Acquisitions and consolidation ==
In 1983, Quad/Graphics purchased Milwaukee Magazine, and made Betty Quadracci (the wife of Harry V. Quadracci) the president and publisher.

In July 2010, Quad acquired competitor World Color Press, In November it acquired the HGI Company, a commercial and specialty products printer; this was followed by a July 2011 asset swap with Transcontinental Incorporated, in which Quad acquired Transcontinental's Mexican assets, along with its black-and-white book printing business for U.S. export (in exchange for seven of Quad's Canadian facilities).

From 2010 to 2013, Quad engaged in a series of acquisitions and consolidations in response to shifting market conditions, including the slow decline of print, the rise of digital and mobile technologies, and the economic downturn created by the Great Recession in the late 2000s. The company closed more than 50 printing plants and began building production studios and providing marketing services to longtime catalog clients like LL Bean and Cabela’s. When asked about the company’s strategy during that time, Joel Quadracci told Adweek, “For us, it was we better become the consolidator, or the consolidating is going to be done to us.”

Employees were offered a separation package that included severance pay, continuation of health care benefits, and career transition assistance.

On January 16, 2013, Quad acquired Vertis Holdings, Inc., a printer of retail inserts, direct mail and in-store marketing materials. In December 2013, the company acquired the packaging company Proteus. In 2014, Quad acquired UniGraphic Inc., “one of the largest commercial printers in the Boston metro area.”

In February 2015, Quad acquired Marin’s International, a French company operating in the point-of-sale display industry. In July 2016, Quad announced a $12 million minority investment in Rise Interactive, a Chicago-based digital marketing agency. In 2018, Quad acquired a majority interest in the company. The majority interest investment was made soon after Quad’s acquisition of Ivie & Associates Inc., a marketing and advertising firm with North American headquarters in Flower Mound, Texas.

In November 2018, the company acquired LSC Communications in an all-stock deal for $1.4 billion. Shareholders of both companies approved the merger in February 2019. However, in June 2019 the U.S. Department of Justice's antitrust division sued to block the acquisition. A trial date was set that likely would not have resulted in a decision until 2020, a costly delay that caused both companies to call off of the deal. Quad paid LSC a reverse termination fee of $45 million, as required by the merger agreement. Since 2010 the company has closed 47 printing facilities in response to changing media and advertising trends.

In November 2018, as part of its continued diversification, Quad agreed to purchase Minneapolis-based advertising firm Periscope, Inc., for $132 million, a deal which closed in January 2019. At the time, Periscope employed over 500 people, providing services across creative advertising, packaging, production, and media buying. In January 2020, Periscope CEO Elizabeth Ross left, and was replaced by an interim CEO from Quad; in June 2020, Periscope announced Cari Bucci-Hulings would join Periscope as its new president, effective July 6, 2020.

In 2020, citing a challenging retail environment exacerbated by the COVID-19 pandemic, Quad announced that it would cease print manufacturing operations at three production facilities (Fernley, Nevada; Oklahoma City, Oklahoma; and Nashville, Tennessee). Slated for early 2021, the planned closures impacted approximately 650 workers. On October 31, 2020, Quad also sold its two remaining book manufacturing facilities. The divestiture was part of a previously announced decision to improve its product portfolio.

Also in 2020, Quad acquired Apple Tree Group, a strategic and creative agency specializing in point-of-sale advertising. Based in Mexico City, near Quad’s existing Mexico operations, Apple Tree is part of Quad’s in-store marketing group.

In October 2023, Quad announced that it would cease operations at its Effingham, Illinois print manufacturing location by the end of the year, impacting 350 employees. Quad attributed the decision to industry-wide volume declines due to ongoing economic uncertainty and increasing postage rates. Work that was performed in the Effingham location was set to be consolidated into other Quad locations with enhanced direct mail capabilities. For employees unable to relocate to other Quad facilities, the company offered separation pay, continuation of health care benefits, and career transition assistance.

In February 2024, Quad acquired DART Innovation, an in-store digital media services provider.

In March 2025, Quad completed the sale of its European operations for €41 million (approximately $42 million) to Germany-based private capital investment manager Capmont. The transaction included all employees and facilities for Quad/Graphics Europe print and ink-manufacturing headquartered in Wyszków, Poland; the Peppermint agency in Warsaw, Poland; and Quad POS (including Marin’s International SAS), which has locations throughout Europe.

== Controversies ==
On July 1, 2020, at least five employees at Periscope walked out in protest against Quad, alleging "interference by its parent company in Periscope’s social media communications about the Black Lives Matter movement and staffer concerns that Quad was releasing deceptive data about its employee diversity." The walk-out was led by a group strategy director at Periscope who, weeks earlier, had started a movement to address the "systemic racism that is afflicting our industry." On July 2, 2020, approximately 150 employees walked out, consisting of nearly the entire Periscope Minneapolis office. After the walkout, Quad gave Periscope editorial independence over its social media posts and apologized for being “slow to communicate its commitment to ending systemic racism".

== Office locations ==
Quad is headquartered in Sussex, Wisconsin. The company has 33 manufacturing and distribution facilities and 50 client-based on-site locations around the world. In December 2022, Quad opened an office in New York. It included space for pop-up experiences for clients without physical stores in Manhattan, event space, and space for two of the company’s acquisitions, Periscope and Rise Interactive.
