= Qwiki =

American video software company

- Available in: English
- Revenue: Users
- Launched: 24 January 2011
- Current status: Dissolved

Qwiki was a New York City–based startup automated video production company acquired by Yahoo! on July 2, 2013 for a reported $50 million. Qwiki released an iPhone app that automatically turns the pictures and videos from a user's camera roll into movies to share. The company's initial product, an iPad application that created video summaries of over 3 million search terms, was downloaded more than 3 million times and named by Apple as the best "Search and Reference" application of 2011.

After integrating this technology in the Bing search engine and launching video creation tools for major publishers in cooperation with ABC News, the company launched Qwiki for iPhone, which received Apple's Editor's Choice and was mentioned as an Honoree in the 2013 Webby's in two categories. Time Inc. named Qwiki one of “10 NYC Startups to Watch” for 2013. The company's investors included cofounders of Facebook, YouTube and Groupon. After a meeting between Doug Imbruce and Marissa Mayer, the company was acquired for $50 million. Imbruce was the Co-founder and CEO of Qwiki. The company's other Co-founder was Louis Monier, inventor of the Altavista search engine.

== Company history ==
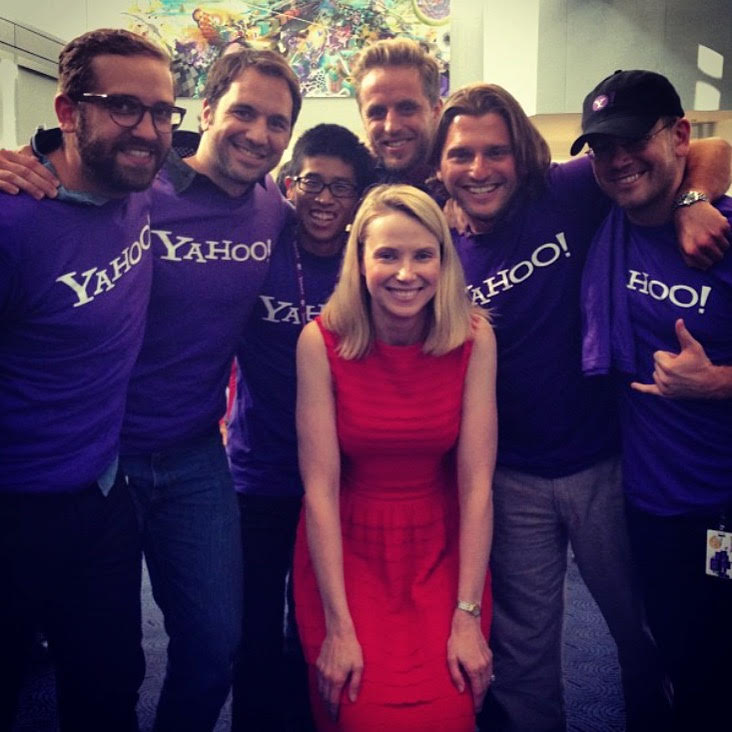
Qwiki team and Yahoo! CEO Marissa Mayer at the Company’s Sunnyvale HQ, July 2013

Qwiki launched in alpha testing mode on January 24, 2011 after winning the TechCrunch Disrupt Award in 2010.

Soon after Google offered to buy Qwiki for $100–150 million which it declined.

In January 2011, Qwiki raised $8 million in Series A financing, a round that was led primarily by Facebook co-founder Eduardo Saverin. Other investors included Jawed Karim (co-founder, YouTube) and Pradeep Sindhu (co-founder, Juniper Networks). Institutional investors included Lerer Media Ventures, Tugboat Ventures and Contour Venture Partners. The individual investor syndicate was arranged by New York City-based Felix Investments. On January 24, 2011, Qwiki launched its public alpha.

In March 2011, Qwiki raised an additional $1 million from Groupon and Lightbank co-founders Brad Keywell and Eric Lefkofsky, bringing the total raised to date to $10.5 million.

In April 2011 Qwiki released an iPad App version of its service. The application has an additional feature not present in the web version that lets the user browse Google Maps which displays Qwiki annotations at certain points linked to content relevant to those locations. Seven weeks after launch, the Qwiki App was downloaded over 500,000 times.

In February 2012, Qwiki relocated to New York City from its Bay Area offices in order to be closer to major media organizations.

In May 2012, Qwiki launched a new platform for bloggers and online publishers including a partnership with ABC News. The television network used Qwiki technology on ABCNews.com and GoodMorningAmerica.com

In June 2012, Bing announced that it would display Qwiki videos on Bing search pages just below Wikipedia and that users will be able to play Qwikis without leaving their search.

In February 2013, Qwiki for iPhone launched on the App Store as Editors' Choice. The app was downloaded more than 125K times in the first 6 days after launch.

In May 2013, Time Inc. named Qwiki one of "10 NYC Startups to Watch for 2013".

In July 2013, Yahoo acquired Qwiki for $50 million.

In September 2014, Yahoo announced that Qwiki would shut down on November 1.
