= Fred D. Schaufeld =

American businessman

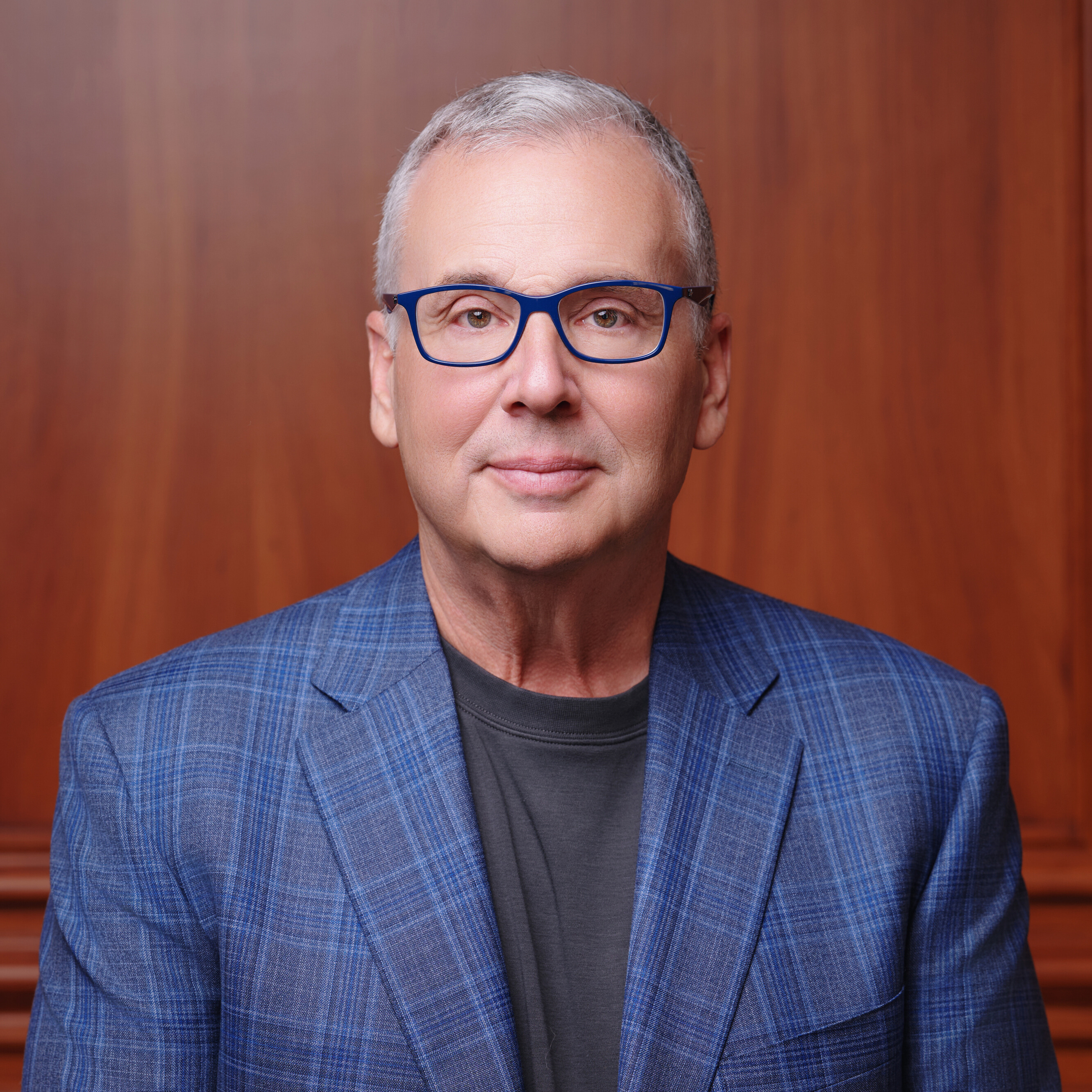
Fred Schaufeld in 2025.

Fred D. Schaufeld (born September 23, 1959) is an entrepreneur, venture capital investor, sports team owner, philanthropist and patent holder.

Schaufeld is a co-founder and managing director of SWaN & Legend Venture Partners (SWaN). He is a partner in Monumental Sports & Entertainment. He also is a partner in the Washington Nationals (MLB), Team Liquid (esports), the Professional Fighters League and the Hill Top House Hotel, Harpers Ferry, WV.

Schaufeld is the majority owner of American Bike Ride, parent of the DC Bike Ride. American Bike Ride is designed to promote bicycle riding and currently hosts 20-mile, road rides in four cities across the United States. He also currently sits on the boards of Sugar23, DuraStat, José Andrés Group, Mindshow, Georgiamune and Telos (Nasdaq: TLS). He previously was an advisor to the boards of Cava Group, ClassEDU, Growcentia and Biothred and previously sat on the boards of American Honors College, Anonymous Content, Asurion, Bio-Warn, Framebridge, KIND Healthy Snacks, NEW, OrderGroove and SocialRadar.

Prior to SWaN, Schaufeld founded and led National Electronics Warranty Corporation (NEW), which was acquired by Asurion in 2008 (now NEW Asurion). NEW Asurion is the world's largest consumer product protection company, employing more than 20,000 people worldwide. During his tenure, NEW was recognized by Inc. Magazine in its "Inc. 500" list of the fastest-growing private companies in America. Mr. Schaufeld is the patent holder of the Rigid Insurance Form (Patent #4,874,187) and a Founder and former President of the Service Contract Industry Council (SCIC), a national Extended warranty trade association that works with lawmakers across the country to develop fair and uniform regulation to protect consumers.

In 1996, Schaufeld and his partner, Tony Nader, presented the financially troubled Best Buy Corporation (NYSE: BBY) with their concept: "Making Best Buy Even Better," suggesting comprehensive consumer extended warranties could be sold without pressure or sales commissions at significantly lower prices than offered by BBY's main competitor, Circuit City. The adoption of the program led BBY to become the single biggest NYSE large-cap turnaround/growth stock as of that time.

== SWaN & Legend ==
Along with Anthony Nader and Cliff White, Schaufeld co-founded SWaN Investors in 2006. He is one of five partners of SWaN & Legend, a multi-stage venture capital firm that invests in high-growth, high-quality organizations and the entrepreneurs behind them. A few of the companies in which the firm has invested include Anonymous Content, Sugar23, Custom Ink, KIND Healthy Snacks, Optoro, Quad Learning, Inc., José Andrés Group, Bigteams, Framebridge and UrbanStems.

== Personal ==
Schaufeld was born in Long Island, NY, in 1959. A shy child, he kept to himself most of the time but was a constant presence at his mother, Elaine's, used-car lot in Queens, NY. At 14, he washed and vacuumed cars in the lot and soon rode his bike down Queens Boulevard to Jamaica, Queens to pick up license plate applications for his mom and other dealers.

His next step in the car business was working for a car warranty company, which he soon realized was a scam that was duping its customers. That experience eventually led Schaufeld to start his own auto warranty business, which expanded into retail, including large-appliance clients like Best Buy. According to Schaufeld, the key to running a successful warranty business is to run it ethically.

While still in college at Lehigh University, Schaufeld was "petrified to raise his hand in class for fear of having to speak in public."

A life-changing experience changed that for Schaufeld. His father died of prostate cancer while he was attending Lehigh. The ensuing family drama left him with no money to continue his college education. When he returned to Lehigh, intending to drop out, one of the school's deans helped him secure scholarships to complete his education.

This event may have been the impetus behind Schaufeld's decision to do something "totally crazy" in his junior year. He decided to run for the elected position of concert chair on the school's student activities council. He won and took charge of bringing top concerts and shows to the school. During his tenure, Schaufeld brought 20 major acts, including The Marshall Tucker Band, Journey (band), The Allman Brothers Band, James Taylor, 38 Special (band),Hall & Oates, Ted Nugent, Rodney Dangerfield, Beatlemania, Jim Carroll, Ozzy Osbourne, Cheap Trick, Yes (band), and the Grateful Dead, to Lehigh.

Though he did drop out of his public speaking course, he became accustomed to standing in front of 6,800 screaming fans before concerts and shouting "Are you ready to rock 'n' roll?" at the top of his lungs. The shy, introverted version of his earlier years was gone. He went on to create NEW, the most successful warranty marketing and administration business in the country, with more than 6,000 employees and 35,000 authorized repair stations. In 2008, NEW merged with Asurion to become NEW Asurion.

Today, Schaufeld and his wife, Karen, live in Virginia and are active in organizations dedicated to education, health, environment, peace, interfaith tolerance, military support, and the arts. He is the former chairman of the Inova Health System Foundation and sits on the board of the Wolf Trap Foundation for the Performing Arts. He is a member of Venture Philanthropy Partners and a supporter of the Schaufeld Family Heart Center of the Inova Loudoun Hospital; the Schaufeld Program for Prostate Cancer in Black Men of the Johns Hopkins University Hospital; the Fredrick D. and Karen G. Schaufeld Lower School of Loudoun Country Day School, Leesburg, VA; the Fredrick D. Schaufeld Scholarship program, Westbury, NY; Lehigh University's Karen Shihadeh Schaufeld and Fredrick D. Schaufeld Endowed Scholarship Fund and Joachim Schaufeld Center for Jewish Life; the Emil and Grace Shihadeh Innovation Center, Winchester, VA; All Ages Read Together; 100WomenStrong; and the OneVoice Movement. He is a recipient of the Loudoun Laurels Foundation Laureate Award and the Loudoun County Boy Scouts' Good Scout Award.

== Honors and awards ==
Schaufeld is a recipient of Ernst & Young Entrepreneur of the Year Award. He received the 2023 Horatio Alger Award from the Horatio Alger Association of Distinguished Americans. He is a member of The Economic Club of Washington, DC, the Young Presidents' Organization (YPO) and its Peace Action Network Arab American Action Forum. Mr. Schaufeld has been quoted extensively in numerous publications and has appeared on CNN and NPR.

- Horatio Alger Association of Distinguished Americans Award, 2023
- Loudoun Laurels Foundation Laureate Honoree, 2018
- Ernst & Young Entrepreneur of the Year Award, 1999
- Rigid Insurance Form Patent #4,874,187, October 1989

== Organizations ==
- Economic Club of Washington, DC
- World Presidents' Organization

== Philanthropy ==
- Fight for Children, board member
- One Voice Movement, advisory board member
- Venture Philanthropy Partners, member
- Schaufeld Family Heart Center of the Inova Loudoun Hospital
- Fredrick D. and Karen G. Schaufeld Family Foundation
- Fredrick D. and Karen G. Schaufeld Lower School of Loudoun Country Day School, Leesburg, VA
- Fred Schaufeld Scholarship Program,, Westbury, NY

== Current board membership ==
- DuraStat
- Georgiamune
- Horatio Alger Association
- José Andrés Think Food Group
- Mindshow
- Telos
- Class Technologies
- Sugar23

== Previous board membership ==
- American Honors College
- Anonymous Content
- Asurion
- Biothred
- Cava
- Bio-Warn
- Curator Solutions
- Custom Ink
- Framebridge
- Growcentia (advisory member)
- M34 Capital
- NEWAsurion
- Noodle Partners
- PFL
- SocialRadar

== Education ==
Schaufeld earned his BA in government from Lehigh University.
