= Brad Keywell =

American entrepreneur (born 1969)

- Born: October 1969 (age 56–57); Detroit, Michigan, U.S.
- Education: University of Michigan (BBA, JD)
- Occupations: Founder and executive chairman
- Website: bradkeywell.com

Bradley A. Keywell (born October 1969) is an American billionaire entrepreneur. He is Founder and Executive Chairman of Gigawatt AI. He is an original investor of Tempus AI, and on its Board from inception until 2019. He is a founder of Groupon, Uptake Technologies, Infinite Epigenetics, Echo Global Logistics, Mediaocean, DRIVIN, and Lightbank. He founded WNDR Museum and Chicago Ideas.

As of August, 2026, Forbes estimated his net worth at US$1.6 billion, down from $2.7 billion in December 2021.

Keywell won the 2019 EY World Entrepreneur Of The Year award, and the US award in 2018.

== Early life and education ==
Bradley A. Keywell grew up in Bloomfield Hills, Michigan and attended Cranbrook Schools. He studied at the London School of Economics in 1990, received a Bachelor of Business Administration in 1991 from the University of Michigan and a juris doctor cum laude in 1993 from the University of Michigan Law School. He is a member of the State Bar of Michigan and the State Bar of Illinois.

== Career ==
Keywell started his first business at age 7, a greeting card company called Key Creations. He started several businesses while an undergrad student at the University of Michigan.

As a freshman, he met Sam Zell and proceeded to spend part of his summers as an intern for Zell's Equity Group Investments. Zell became an important mentor to Keywell for the following 35 years until his death in 2023. Keywell was on the board of directors of Zell's Equity Residential for ten years.

In 1999, Keywell and Eric Lefkofsky co-founded Starbelly, an online supply chain management firm, which was acquired in January 2000 by HA-LO (NYSE:HMK) for $240 million.

In February 2005, Keywell co-founded Echo Global Logistics, a technology-enabled provider of transportation and logistics services, which had an IPO on NASDAQ in 2009. Keywell was the founding CEO, then was chairman and lead independent director until 2017. Echo was acquired in 2021 by The Jordan Company for $1.3 billion.

In June 2006, Keywell co-founded MediaBank, a SaaS provider to the advertising and media buying industry, and was the founding CEO and then on the board of directors until the company's sale. In 2012, a merger between MediaBank and Donovan Data Systems (DDS) created Mediaocean, and in 2014, Vista Equity Partners acquired MediaOcean.

In 2007, Keywell co-founded Groupon, the collective buying platform, which Forbes called 'The Fastest Growing Company Ever' in 2010. Groupon had an IPO on NASDAQ in 2011. Keywell was on Groupon's board of directors from its inception through 2017.

In February 2010, Keywell co-founded Lightbank, a technology venture capital and private equity firm, and was a managing director through 2018. Lightbank's portfolio includes early-stage investments in Sprout Social (NASDAQ:SPT), Udemy (NASDAQ:UDMY), Coffee Meets Bagel, Benzinga (sold to Beringer Capital), Reverb (sold to Etsy), Fooda, EventUp (sold to Gather), BenchPrep, Zeel, and TastyTrade (sold to IG Group).

In 2013, Keywell co-founded DRIVIN, an automobile data analytics company. In 2016, KAR Auction Services (NYSE:KAR) acquired DRIVIN for $43 million.

In 2014, Keywell co-founded the industrial AI software company Uptake, which is valued at over $2.3 billion. Uptake's applications are featured in the Microsoft Energy Core suite. Uptake was named the Hottest Startup of the Year by Forbes in 2015. Uptake was named a CNBC Disruptor 50 winner for three consecutive years, including the #5 ranked CNBC Disruptor in 2017. Keywell was named a Technology Pioneer by the World Economic Forum in 2017. Uptake was sold to Bosch in 2026.

In 2015, Keywell was an early investor in Tempus AI, an AI-enabled precision medicine company, and was on its Board of Directors from inception until 2019. Tempus was named to the CNBC Disruptor 50 list in 2021, and has raised over $1 billion in capital from investors including Google, Franklin Templeton, and T.Rowe Price.

In September 2018, Keywell founded WNDR Museum, an experiential art museum located in Chicago's West Loop. WNDR has since expanded to include WNDR Museum locations in San Diego, Seattle, and Boston, and had announced plans for further expansion. By 2026, all WNDR Museum locations had closed.

In January 2024, Keywell joined the board of directors for TKO Group.

In August 2025, Keywell founded Gigawatt AI, Inc., an AI-native operating system purpose-built for utilities.

== Teaching & Writing ==
Keywell is an adjunct professor at the Booth School of Business at the University of Chicago.

He is the author (with his daughter Chloe) of the book Isabelle Speaks Up: A Story of Possibilities, and of Biz Dev 3.0: Changing Business as We Know It, published by ALM Publishing.

He is the host of a podcast, The Upside, and a participant of the Renaissance Weekend and the TED Conference.

== Philanthropy ==
In 2014, Keywell created the Keywell Foundation to support nonprofit and NGO enterprises.

In 2015, Brad Keywell signed The Giving Pledge to donate more than half his wealth to charity.

He is the founder and chairman of Chicago Ideas, an innovation and ideas platform with over 30,000 in-person attendees annually and global reach through its online channels.

He is the founder and chairman emeritus of the Future Founders Foundation, which provides entrepreneurial education to Chicago students.

Keywell was named chairman of the Illinois Innovation Council by Illinois Governor Pat Quinn.

== Awards & Recognition ==
Keywell was the EY World Entrepreneur of the Year in 2019, after being named the EY Overall US Entrepreneur of the Year in 2018.

Keywell was named to the Chicago Innovation Hall of Fame in 2021.

Keywell appeared in a commercial for the CNBC 30th Anniversary Future of Business series in 2020.

Keywell was named a technology pioneer by the World Economic Forum in 2018.

Keywell was a judge on the 2022 EY World Entrepreneur of the Year.

== Personal life ==
Keywell was married to Kimberly "Kim". They have two children. They filed for divorce in December 2021.
