= GroupPrice =

- Website type: eCommerce
- Available in: English
- Founder: Van Jepson
- Launched: November 30, 2010; 15 years ago
- Current status: Online

GroupPrice was a business-to-business deal website that sells discounted software and services for small to medium-sized Internet centric companies. GroupPrice enabled online merchants to advertise their products and services to a target audience of small businesses.

The company targeted businesses with an online presence up to 25 employees and up to $10 million in annual revenue. GroupPrice took a commission from each purchased deal and passed the sale to the merchant with new customer information.

GroupPrice sold software and services to American small businesses and differs from the business-to-consumer daily deal model made popular by Groupon including; no local deals on food or entertainment, no minimum number of sales needed before a buyer can have access to the deal, and no time limit tied to the deal.

== History ==
GroupPrice was founded by Van Jepson in June 2010 in Redwood City, California.

The company was self-funded with $30,000 before several advisors turned into investors and completed a seed round of $285,000 in July 2010.

It launched on November 30, 2010.

== Awards ==
GroupPrice was named one of Entrepreneur Magazine's top 100 Brilliant Companies in 2011 in the Startup-to-Startup category.
