= Belly (loyalty program) =

US company

- Company type: Private
- Available in: English
- Headquarters: Chicago, Illinois, {{{location_country}}}
- Founders: Logan LaHive, Craig Ulliott
- Website: bellycard.com
- Launched: August 2011
- Current status: Unknown
- Native clients on: iOS, Android

Belly was a loyalty program founded in August 2011 in Chicago by Logan LaHive and Craig Ulliott, and initially funded by Lightbank. In 2018, the Belly product line assets were acquired by Mobivity Holdings Corp.

== History ==
It was founded in August 2011 in Chicago by Logan LaHive and Craig Ulliott, receiving its initial round of around $3 million in funding from Chicago-based venture capital firm Lightbank. By May 2012, Belly had signed up around 1,400 merchants and was available in Chicago, Austin, Milwaukee, Madison, Wis., Washington D.C., Phoenix, New York and Boston, and had around 200,000 active users. At that time it received an additional $10 million in funding from Andreessen Horowitz and Silicon Valley Bank.

In September 2012, Belly was included as a launch partner in Apple Wallet. By September 2013, Belly was integrated into Google Wallet. In August 2013, Belly received a Series B-1 round of funding of $12.1 million led by New Enterprise Associates, Andreessen Horowitz, DAG Ventures, Lightbank, Cisco Systems, and 7-Ventures, a subsidiary of 7-Eleven. In June 2014, Belly announced international expansion, starting in Canada. In August 2014, 7-Eleven rolled out the Belly rewards program in 2,600 locations. However, 7-Eleven discontinued the Belly program on November 30, 2016.

In November 2016, Logan LaHive stepped down as CEO of Belly and was succeeded by COO Dan Gloede. In November 2018, the Belly product line assets were acquired from Hatch Loyalty by Mobivity Holdings Corp.

== Operations ==
Belly provided a loyalty program for merchants, using an in-store iPad for the merchant and an app for customers. It charged merchants $50 to $100 a month for the service, which included an iPad, a case and lock for the iPad, marketing materials, plus data and analytics. Customers earned loyalty points by checking in at the store with a QR code technology to earn points that could be redeemed as a merchant chose.
