= BenchPrep =

American company

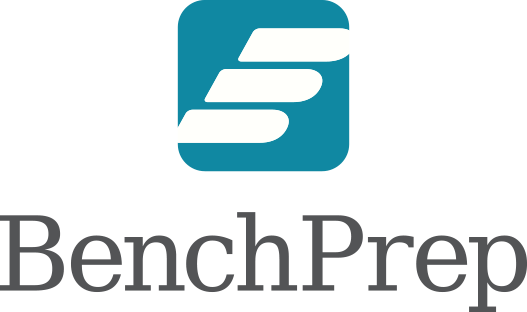
- Formerly: Watermelon Express
- Industry: Education
- Founded: 2009; 17 years ago
- Founder: Ashish Rangnekar; Ujjwal Gupta
- Headquarters: Chicago, Illinois
- Website: benchprep.com

BenchPrep is an American company that provides cloud-based study guides for standardized tests, professional certifications, and K-12 classroom learning. It has partnered with educational publishers such as McGraw Hill, John Wiley & Sons, and the Princeton Review to create interactive, digitized courses.

== History ==
BenchPrep, formerly known as Watermelon Express, was founded in 2009 by Ashish Rangnekar and Ujjwal Gupta, after Ashish Rangnekar won the New Venture Challenge at the University of Chicago. Shortly thereafter, BenchPrep received $2.2 million in seed funding from Lightbank, the executives behind Groupon. In July 2012, the company announced a $6 million round of funding from New Enterprise Associates and Revolution LLC.

In 2019, the company announced a $20 million round of funding from Jump Capital and Owl Ventures.
