= VentureBeat =

American technology news and analysis website

- Website type: Technology news and analysis
- Available in: English
- Creator: Matt Marshall
- Website: venturebeat.com
- Commercial: Yes
- Launched: October 2006; 20 years ago
- Current status: Active

VentureBeat is an American technology website headquartered in San Francisco, California. It publishes news, analysis, long-form features, interviews, and videos. The VentureBeat company was founded in 2006 by Matt Marshall, an ex-correspondent for The Mercury News.

== History ==
In March 2009, VentureBeat signed a partnership agreement with IDG to produce DEMO Conference, a conference for startups to announce their launches and raise funding from venture capitalists and angel investors. The partnership with IDG ended in 2012.

In 2014 and 2015, the company raised outside investor funding from Silicon Valley venture capitalist firms including Crosslink Capital, Walden Venture Capital, Rally Ventures, Formation 8, and Lightbank.

VentureBeat used Bing Chat to assist with article writing as of April 2023, when it urged its writers to incorporate "sentences and fragments" from AI chatbots that are separately verified. In an interview with Bloomberg News, VentureBeat editorial director Michael Nuñez stated regarding the website's use of AI, "I don't think our readers care, to be totally honest."

In 2025, GamesBeat, a video game publication launched by Dean Takahashi, spun out from VentureBeat into a separate entity. VentureBeat said it would sharpen its focus on "the enterprise shift to AI, data infrastructure and intelligent security".
