= Hmizate =

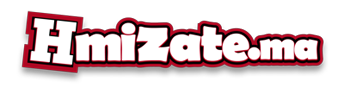
- Company type: Private
- Available in: French
- Founded: January 2011; 15 years ago in Casablanca, Morocco
- Area served: Morocco
- Industry: Internet
- Services: Online shopping, payment systems, digital wallets
- Website: www.hmizate.ma
- Current status: Active

Hmizate is an e-commerce company in Casablanca, Morocco. It was founded in January 2011. Over the years Hmizate launched different verticals such as travel, leisure, shopping, food delivery and most recently mobile payment.

== History ==
Hmizate was started in January 2011 as a daily deals platform and expanded later on to become a marketplace for services.

In 2018, the company made a pivot into fintech and e-commerce and launched their mobile application adding a digital wallet and new services and P2P money transfer. The company generate a commission on each transaction via its platform and also uses advertising and paid promotional content to generate revenues.

== Investors and funds ==
In 2013, after two years of activity, Hmizate raises 1.6 million dollars from the Belgian investment fund Hummingbird and increased its advertising budget and had an increase in the number of products offered.

== Competition ==
The company has managed to face down the international competitors such as Groupon that ended its activities in 2015 and left the Moroccan market. In 2017 the company was listed in Forbes Top 100 startups in the MENA.
