= Bowery Farming =

Farming and agriculture company in the US

Bowery Farming, Inc.
- Type: Private
- Industry: Farming, vertical farming, hydroponic farming
- Founded: 2015
- Headquarters: New York, New York, United States
- Areas served: United States
- Key people: Irving Fain
- Website: boweryfarming.com

Bowery Farming was a New York-based vertical farming and digital agriculture company with farms in New Jersey, Maryland, and Pennsylvania. It grew and delivered pesticide-free lettuce, leafy greens, and herbs. The largest vertical farming operation in the United States, it served major retailers at over 850 locations throughout the Northeast and Mid-Atlantic regions, including Whole Foods and Walmart, and supported local, fresh produce supply for a number of food-delivery companies.

== History ==
Bowery Farming was founded in 2015 by entrepreneur Irving Fain, who earlier in his career co-founded CrowdTwist, acquired by Oracle Corporation for $100 million. Irving brought on entrepreneurs David Golden and Brian Falther as cofounders. Henry Sztul, joined shortly after as part of the founding team and led the development of the BoweryOS; he now served as the company's Chief Science Officer. The company raised a total of $472 million from Google Ventures, General Catalyst, GGV Capital and Temasek. Its latest round of funding in 2021 was led by Fidelity Investments. Investors in the company include Lewis Hamilton, Tom Colicchio, Chris Paul, José Andrés, Justin Timberlake, and Natalie Portman.

In 2021, Bowery opened Farm X, an innovation hub for plant science in Kearny, N.J., to grow crops beyond leafy greens and focusing on seed breeding specifically for indoor farming. The company added a third commercial smart farm in Bethlehem, Pennsylvania in 2021.

Bowery Farming operated three commercial farms and two R&D facilities in Kearny, NJ. It grew its produce inside industrial warehouses in New Jersey, Pennsylvania, and Maryland, using proprietary technology and vertical farming techniques, and without pesticides and minimal water footprint. Its locally grown products were delivered to Whole Foods Market, Giant Food, Walmart, Albertson's Companies (ACME and Safeway stores), and Weis Markets, among others. Bowery Farming also supported Hungryroot and Amazon delivery options.

Bowery Farming's technology relied on automation, sensors, robotics, AI and a proprietary operating system, BoweryOS, that took photos of crops and analyzes data in real time. The company hired former Samsung Chief Technologist, Injong Rhee, to accelerate the integration of Bowery's proprietary technology across its network of vertical smart farms. In 2022, the company bought farming robotics firm, Traptic, especially for vine crops.

Bowery Farming ceased operations in November 2024, laying off staff at facilities in New Jersey, Pennsylvania and Maryland. The company faced financial difficulties, probably because of weak demand for its high-priced products and yield losses caused by widespread infection of a plant disease in several facilities.
