= Eric Lefkofsky =

American billionaire businessman (born 1969)

- Born: September 2, 1969 (age 57); West Bloomfield, Michigan, U.S.
- Education: University of Michigan (BA, JD)
- Occupation: Businessman
- Known for: Co-founder, Groupon
- Title: Founder and CEO, Tempus AI
- Spouse: Elizabeth Kramer (m. 1997)
- Children: 3, including Stella
- Website: lefkofsky.com

Eric Paul Lefkofsky (born September 2, 1969) is an American billionaire businessman. He is the founder and CEO of Tempus AI, and the co-founder of Groupon, Echo Global Logistics (ECHO), InnerWorkings (INWK), and Mediaocean. As of June 2024, he is also a co-managing partner of Chicago-based venture capital firm Lightbank. As of September 2025, his net worth was estimated at US$6 billion.

== Biography ==
Eric Paul Lefkofsky was born on September 2, 1969 in West Bloomfield, Michigan, and grew up in Southfield with a Jewish family background. His father, Bill, was a structural engineer, and his mother, Sandy, was a school teacher. After graduating from Southfield-Lathrup High School in 1987, he attended the University of Michigan and graduated with honors in 1991. He enrolled at the University of Michigan Law School and received his Juris Doctor in 1993.

== Entrepreneurial ventures ==
After graduating from law school in 1993, Lefkofsky and a college friend, Brad Keywell, borrowed money from relatives to buy Brandon Apparel, a clothing company in Madison, Wisconsin. In 1999, they created an Internet company, Starbelly, that specialized in promotional products. In January 2000, Lefkofsky and Keywell sold the firm to Halo Industries. Lefkofsky joined Halo as chief operating officer.

In the fall of 2001, Lefkofsky co-founded InnerWorkings, a firm providing print procurement services for mid-sized companies. In August 2006, the company went public with an initial public offering. Lefkofsky was on its board of directors until October 2012.

In February 2005, Lefkofsky co-founded a freight logistics company, Echo Global Logistics. It attracted financing from New Enterprise Associates and went public on the Nasdaq under the symbol 'ECHO' in June 2006.

In June 2006, Lefkofsky co-founded MediaBank, a company providing technology for advertising buyers. In June 2007, the firm acquired Datatech, a media planning and procurement platform. In July 2007, New Enterprise Associates invested in MediaBank. In 2012, a merger between MediaBank and Donovan Data Systems created Mediaocean in a deal estimated at $1.5 billion.

In January 2007, Lefkofsky provided $1 million in funding for ThePoint.com, a collective action website started by ex-InnerWorkings employee Andrew Mason. New Enterprise Associates led an early-stage investment round. In late 2008, the site changed its name to Groupon.com. In October 2009, Groupon raised $30 million from Accel Partners and New Enterprise Associates. In April 2010, Digital Sky Technology and Battery Ventures invested $135 million in Groupon at a valuation of $1.35 billion.

In December 2010, Google offered a reported $6 billion for Groupon. The offer was turned down, possibly due to anti-trust and regulatory scrutiny the deal might face. In October 2011, Groupon raised $950 million in private funding and then paid $810 million to employees and investors. Lefkofsky and his family were paid $398 million. In August 2013, Lefkofsky became CEO of Groupon; in November 2016, he stepped down as CEO, resuming his role as Chairman.

In July 2014, Lefkofsky was an early investor in Uptake Technologies, a predictive analytics company. In 2015, Lefkofsky founded Tempus AI, a technology company that enables physicians to deliver personalized care, and serves as its CEO. Tempus went public on June 14, 2024. It is one of six technology companies founded by Lefkofsky to achieve unicorn status with a valuation exceeding $1 billion.

== Philanthropy ==
In 2006, Lefkofsky and his wife, Liz, formed a private charitable trust, The Lefkofsky Family Foundation. Its purpose is to advance high-impact initiatives that enhance the quality of human life in the communities they serve. The foundation has helped fund more than 50 organizations to date.

In 2013, Lefkofsky and his wife joined The Giving Pledge.

== Community interests ==
Lefkofsky is the chairman of the board of directors at The Art Institute of Chicago, the board of directors of the Museum of Science and Industry, and a trustee of Steppenwolf Theatre Company. He is a board member of World Business Chicago, and is co-chairman of its Technology Council.

In May 2008, Lefkofsky joined the committee to bring the 2016 Summer Olympics to Chicago, Chicago 2016.

== Teaching and writing ==
Lefkofsky taught applied technology at DePaul University's Kellstadt Graduate School of Business. At the Kellogg School of Management at Northwestern University, he taught a course in disruptive business models. He is now an adjunct professor at the University of Chicago Booth School of Business, teaching a course on entrepreneurship and building technology-based businesses.

In November 2007, Easton Studio Press published Lefkofsky's Accelerated Disruption, a book about how technology affects business.

== Personal life ==
In 1997, Lefkofsky married Elizabeth (née Kramer). They have three children, including controversial singer-songwriter Stella Lefty.
