= Hungryroot =

American online grocery and meal-planning company

- Type: Private
- Industry: Online grocery; meal kit; food technology
- Founded: 2015; 11 years ago
- Founders: Ben McKean
- Headquarters: New York City, New York, U.S.
- Key people: Ben McKean (CEO)
- Products: Groceries; meal kits; meal-planning subscriptions
- Services: AI-personalized grocery delivery; recipe and meal planning
- Revenue: $700 million (2025)
- Website: hungryroot.com

Hungryroot is an American online grocery and meal-planning company headquartered in New York City. The company uses artificial intelligence to personalize weekly grocery deliveries and recipe recommendations for subscribers. Founded in 2015 by Ben McKean, a former Groupon executive, the company initially sold plant-based prepared foods before pivoting to a full online grocery delivery model. Hungryroot reported $700 million in net revenue for 2025 and was preparing for a potential initial public offering as of early 2026.

== History ==
Ben McKean, who had previously founded the restaurant technology company Savored (acquired by Groupon in 2012), launched Hungryroot in April 2015 in Queens, New York. The company initially offered a small line of plant-based prepared meals marketed as healthier versions of comfort foods, using vegetables as primary ingredients. At launch, its products were sold through its own website and through partners including Amazon Fresh and FreshDirect.

Around 2019, Hungryroot repositioned itself as a personalized online grocery service, adding hundreds of third-party branded products alongside its own items and incorporating AI-driven recommendations to build customized weekly shopping carts for customers.

In February 2026, The Information reported that Hungryroot was preparing for an IPO that could take place as soon as that year, working with Goldman Sachs. McKean said he was watching market conditions closely but had not set a timeline for a listing.

== Products and services ==
Hungryroot operates as a subscription-based online grocery service that combines grocery delivery with meal planning. Customers complete a quiz about dietary preferences, household size, and health goals; the platform's algorithm then generates a personalized weekly cart of groceries and recipes. Unlike general grocery-delivery apps such as Instacart, which deliver food picked up at supermarkets, Hungryroot holds its own inventory. As of 2025, the service listed approximately 1,000 products, including its private-label goods and a curated selection of outside brands. Sales of its own branded products, which include sauces, smoothies, and prepared ingredients, account for around 40% of the company's revenue and carry higher margins than third-party items.

The company's proprietary AI system generates personalized meal plans and shopping carts based on quiz responses and ongoing customer interaction data. As of early 2026, Hungryroot was testing a conversational AI feature allowing users to modify orders using natural language.

== Funding and growth ==
Hungryroot has raised approximately $75 million in venture capital from investors including L Catterton, Lightspeed Venture Partners, and Lerer Hippeau. In March 2016, the company closed a $3.7 million Series A round led by Lightspeed Venture Partners, with participation from Lerer Hippeau and Crosslink Capital. In January 2017, it raised $7.7 million in additional funding, again with Lightspeed as a lead investor.

In June 2021, the company raised $40 million in a Series C round led by L Catterton, valuing Hungryroot at approximately $750 million.

Revenue grew rapidly thereafter: the company reported $237 million in net revenue for 2022, a 47% year-over-year increase. Revenue reached $333 million in 2023, with over $9 million in profit. Net revenue for 2025 was $700 million, a 55% year-over-year increase, serving nearly 1.5 million people in over 700,000 households. The company was profitable in 2025.

== Reception ==
Wired gave Hungryroot a score of 7 out of 10 in March 2025, praising the ease of its recipes and its AI-powered dietary customization. The reviewer noted that meals could sometimes lack intensity of flavor and that the sign-up process required entering payment information before seeing available menu options. Bon Appétit called the service flexible and easy to integrate into a regular cooking routine.Food Network testing praised the freshness of produce and quality of sauces but noted occasional issues with products arriving past their expiration dates.
