= Andrew Mason =

American businessman and entrepreneur (born 1981)

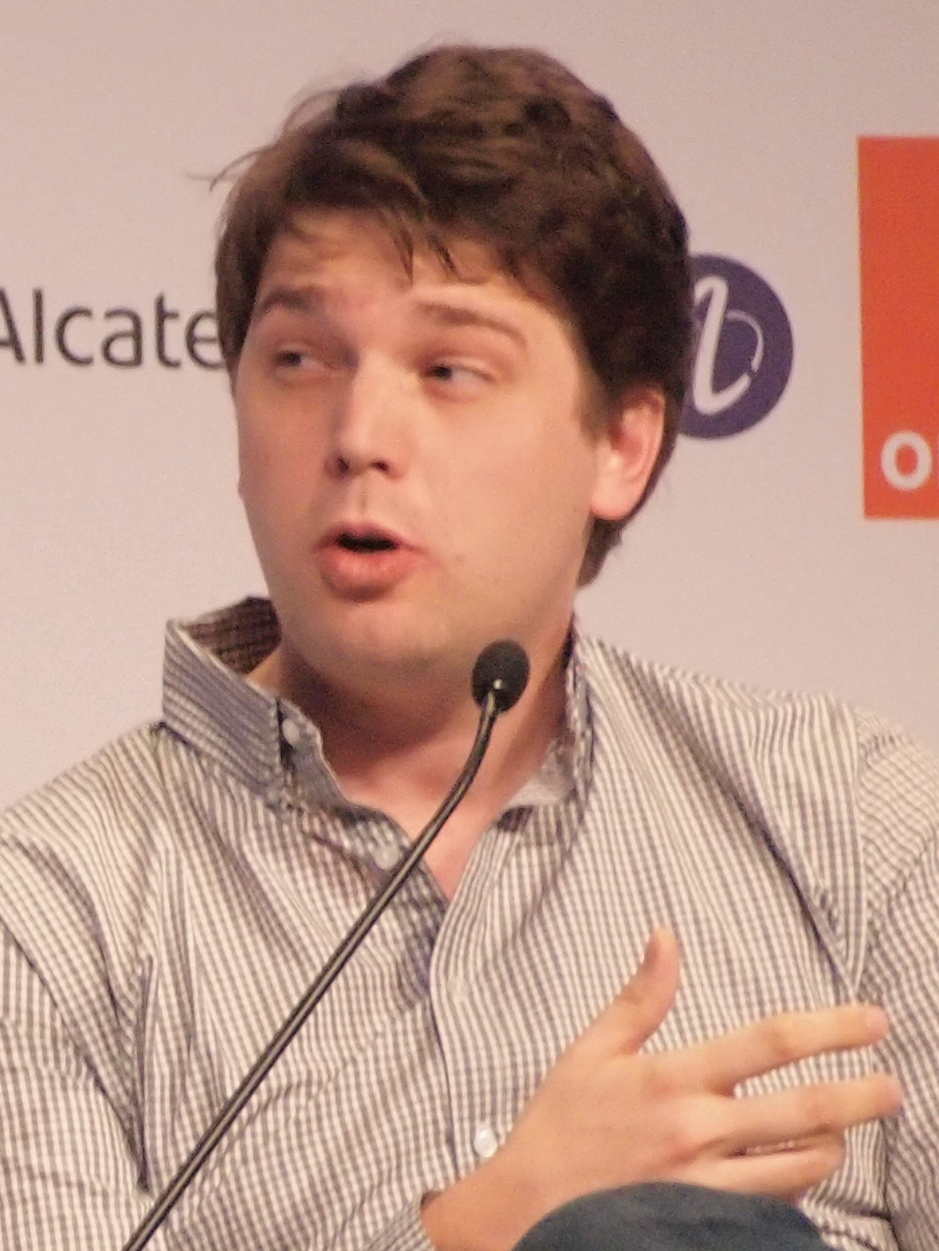
- Mason in 2011
- Born: 1981 (age 44–45); Pittsburgh, Pennsylvania
- Education: Bachelor of Arts in Music (2003) Bienen School of Music, Northwestern University
- Known for: Founder and CEO of Groupon
- Spouse: Jenny Gillespie

Andrew D. Mason (born 1981) is an American businessman and entrepreneur. He is the founder and former CEO of Groupon, a Chicago-based website offering users discounts on local businesses and scholarships. He is also the founder and CEO of Descript, an audio and video editing tool powered by machine learning.

== Early life and education ==
Mason grew up in Mount Lebanon, Pennsylvania, a suburb of Pittsburgh. He graduated from Mt. Lebanon High School in 1999 and started a Saturday morning delivery service called "Bagel Express" when he was aged 15.

After graduating from Northwestern University in 2003 with a degree in music, Mason worked in web design for Chicago entrepreneur Eric Lefkofsky.

Mason stopped working with Lefkofsky to attend the University of Chicago's Harris School of Public Policy after he was awarded a scholarship. However, he dropped out of his master's degree program several months after it started. Mason also interned and worked at prominent Chicago recording studio, Electrical Audio, under recording engineer Steve Albini, whom Mason cited as an inspiration on his subsequent work ethic.

== Career ==
Andrew was employed as a developer at InnerWorkings, a company founded by Lefkofsky, in 2006. Lefkofsky provided Mason with $1 million in "seed money" to bankroll The Point, Mason's first entrepreneurial venture on the Internet.

It was found that The Point – a social initiatives platform whose name was inspired by Malcolm Gladwell's The Tipping Point – was too abstract to market, and it was stripped down to the Groupon concept, a website that sells deals to local businesses. Groupon's website states that since its beginning in November 2008, Groupon has sold more than six million deals. With Groupon taking 50 percent of every deal, plus a small credit-card handling fee, in late 2010 it was reported by Mashable that Groupon's annual revenue was $800 million. On December 1, 2010, The New York Times reported that Groupon was the subject of a $6 billion acquisition bid from Google, which Groupon turned down.

In 2010, Mason's salary was $180,000; "at his own recommendation" it was reduced to $756.72 effective January 1, 2011, according to the company's SEC filings. In 2011, he sold $10 million worth of Groupon stock before the company went public in November. He still owns 46 million Class A shares.

On December 18, 2012, Mason was named "Worst CEO of the Year" by Herb Greenberg of CNBC. Greenberg wrote, in part, "Mason's goofball antics, which can come off more like a big kid than company leader, almost make a mockery of corporate leadership – especially for a company with a market value of more than $3 billion. It would be excusable, even endearing, if the company were doing well (think Herb Kelleher of Southwest Airlines) but it's not. Sales growth is through the floor...".

Mason was dismissed as Groupon's CEO on February 28, 2013, the day after the company missed analysts' expectations for sales, and fell far short of the mark when it came to profit. In a letter to Groupon employees on the day of his dismissal, he wrote in part:

After four and a half intense and wonderful years as CEO of Groupon, I've decided that I'd like to spend more time with my family. Just kidding – I was fired today. If you're wondering why... you haven't been paying attention. From controversial metrics in our S1 to our material weakness to two quarters of missing our own expectations and a stock price that's hovering around one quarter of our listing price, the events of the last year and a half speak for themselves. As CEO, I am accountable....

Journalists estimated that his severance pay was just $378.36—six months' worth of salary—based on his employment agreement and his latest public salary information.

Mason released a motivational rock album entitled Hardly Workin’ in July 2013 through iTunes and Spotify. A journalist described the album in the following manner: "You’re not going to bump Hardly Workin’, ever. But you might give it a spin for fun, and it’s worth that much. Maybe not $9.99 on iTunes, but you could endure a Spotify ad or two just to hear someone in tech do something truly silly." The album was produced by Don Gehman, who has worked with R.E.M. and John Mellencamp, and the motivation behind the album was explained on the website of New York's Daily News:

I managed over 12,000 people at Groupon, most under the age of 25. One thing that surprised me was that many would arrive at orientation with minimal understanding of basic business wisdom....It was with this in mind that I spent a week in LA earlier this month recording Hardly Workin’, a seven song album of motivational business music targeted at people newly entering the workforce."

In February 2015, Mason released an iPhone app, Detour, selling unconventional audio tours of major cities. The initial release offered seven different San Francisco expeditions, each costing $5. In 2018, Detour was acquired by Bose, which was planning to use the app in an upcoming Augmented Reality platform.

== Personal life ==
Mason is married to pop/folk singer Jenny Gillespie.
