= Rebeca Minguela =

Spanish entrepreneur and startup advisor

- Born: 1981 (age 44–45); Cuéllar (Spain)
- Education: Harvard University, Polytechnic University of Madrid
- Occupation: Businesswoman

Rebeca Minguela (born 1981) is a Spanish entrepreneur and startup advisor. She is the founder and CEO of Clarity AI, a technology company that leverages artificial intelligence to support investors, companies, and consumers in integrating sustainability criteria to make informed decisions. With over 300 employees worldwide, Clarity AI is backed by minority investors such as BlackRock and SoftBank.When Blink was acquired by Groupon in September 2013, she joined Groupon. Rebeca also founded and served as the CEO of Blink Booking,now Blink by Groupon, an award-winning mobile app to book hotels last-minute in Europe.

Minguela is co-founder of Global Impact Rating, a startup selected for the Harvard Innovation Labs - iLab (Harvard Business School Incubator) in 2015.

She was selected Young Global Leader of the World Economic Forum in March 2017.

== Blink Booking ==
In 2011, Minguela started Blink Booking, a mobile travel app to book hotels last minute in Europe. Blink Booking was the first startup of a platform aimed at fostering entrepreneurship in Spain. She joined Blink as full-time CEO in March 2012 due to an issue with her co-founder and to be able to manage the rapid growth of the company (as stated in Harvard Business School case about Blink Booking).

Blink Booking attracted investment from tech and travel investors (SoftTech VC, ProFounders – Brent Hoberman, Charles Petruccelli and American Express Travel (UVET Italy), Radisson Hotels, Kibo Ventures and others). The Blink app was available in six languages, Android, iOS / iPhone and HTML5 in eight different European countries.

Blink Booking was advertised in Spanish and Italian TV, and the TV advert "The Lady in White" received the Sol de Bronce award in 2013 (Festival Iberoamericano de Publicidad, FIAP).

In September 2013, Blink Booking was acquired by Groupon to strengthen its travel and mobile business. Blink Booking is now "Blink by Groupon", and Minguela started then working for Groupon.

== Clarity AI ==
Clarity AI is a sustainability technology company that provides data-driven environmental and social analytics to investors, corporations, governments, and consumers. The company uses artificial intelligence to address challenges related to sustainability data coverage, standardization, and analysis. Clarity AI reports a client base that collectively manages over $70 trillion in assets.

== Public speaking, press and awards ==
Minguela and Blink Booking (the company she started and managed) have been mentioned in the press in several countries, with features in publications including Forbes, The Economist, Financial Times, El País, El Mundo, Il Sole 24 Ore, and many others. Minguela's entrepreneurship platform and Blink Booking are also the subject of a business case at Harvard Business School.

Minguela has been a speaker at several events and conferences, including the Harvard European Conference 2015, sharing the panel with the Director General for the European Commission; Spain Tech Week Silicon Valley/ Seattle 2014; Startup Spain 3.0; and Red Innova 2013.

Blink has been a top-rated app by Apple Store and Google Play in several countries. It was awarded "Travel Pioneer of the Year 2012" (Travolution Awards, from Travel Weekly) and "Travel App of the Week" by Female First, and it was a finalist of the fifth edition of the Open Talent Award 2013 to most innovative start-ups. Blink Booking TV advert "The Lady in White" was awarded the Sol de Bronce in 2013 (Festival Iberoamericano de Publicidad, FIAP).

Minguela was named female role model entrepreneur in Spain by El Referente in April 2016.

Minguela has also been a featured speaker at numerous events and conferences, including the Great AI Debate hosted by Politico during the World Economic Forum 2024 at Davos, the COP28 United Nations Climate Change Conference with EY and with former VP of the US Al Gore, participating as a keynote speaker at PRI in Person Tokyo 2023, the 7th edition of the Future Investment Initiative in Riyadh, London Stock Exchange 2023, Harvard European Conference 2015, sharing the panel with the Director General for the European Commission, among others.
