= Britches Great Outdoors =

American clothing company

- Formerly: Britches of Georgetowne (1967-2003)
- Company type: Private
- Industry: Clothing
- Founded: 1967; 59 years ago (original company); 2020; 6 years ago
- Founders: David Pensky; Rick Hindin
- Headquarters: Warrenton, Virginia, U.S.
- Number of locations: 1 store (2026)
- Key people: Matt Carson (President & CEO)
- Products: Men's Clothing
- Website: warthog.vip

Britches Great Outdoors (BGO or Britches) is a clothing company originally founded in Georgetown, Washington, United States. It produces a full line of primarily men's clothing.

== History ==
=== Britches of Georgetown (1967-2003) ===
What originally started as The Georgetown Slack Shoppe in 1966 quickly evolved into a full line of men's dress clothes under a new name; Britches of Georgetowne. Britches of Georgetowne was one of the early retailers of Ralph Lauren ties and in 1977 outfitted the crew of Ted Turner’s Courageous, which won the America’s Cup that year. As the casual clothing side of the business increased it evolved into a new store called Britches Great Outdoors, eventually growing to over 60 stores by 1988 with 35 in the Washington DC area and $100million in sales.

Kara Swisher of The Washington Post said of the Britches style, "The look was timeless with a twist, a traditional-but-not-quite style. The mood in the stores was a bit rakish, goosing the preppy look and injecting some flair. They sold Britches brand clothes not available anywhere else."

Britches of Georgetowne was referred to as "the preppy enclave" in The Kingdom of Prep. This started with the Warthog logo embroidered on their polo shirts. Poking fun at the various animal logos appearing on preppy clothing such as Ralph Lauren's polo pony and the Lacoste alligator, Britches thought of the ugliest animal they could think of and started adding a Warthog logo to their shirts. What started as a joke quickly took hold as an 'anti-brand' or what some have referred to as 'preppy with an edge.'

In 1983 Britches was bought by CML Group, a retail conglomerate that owned brands such as NordicTrack, Boston Whaler and The Nature Company. CML sold Britches' women's wear line to Wet Seal in 2002 where the brand was ultimately shuttered as Wet Seal converted the remaining 83 Britches Great Outdoors stores to their Arden B format targeting an affluent female audience.

The company began to struggle financially from the late 1990s into the early 2000s, filing for bankruptcy protection in late 2002. In mid-2003 the brand officially closed all of its remaining locations.

=== Britches Great Outdoors (2020-Present) ===
In late 2019 Matt Carson purchased the rights to resurrect Britches and started working with many of the original team and manufacturers. As of 2024 Britches operates a store in Warrenton, Virginia.
