= Optoro =

American retail technology company

Optoro, Inc.
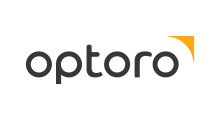
- Type: Privately held company
- Industry: Computer software, reverse logistics
- Founded: 2004; 22 years ago (as eSpot)
- Founders: Tobin Moore; Adam Vitarello
- Headquarters: Washington, D.C., U.S.
- Key people: Amena Ali, CEO; Adam Vitarello, Chief Strategy Officer
- Website: http://optoro.com/

Optoro is a reverse logistics technology company that works with retailers, manufacturers, and third-party logistics (3PL) companies to manage returned and excess merchandise. These products, which range from consumer electronics to home goods to clothing, are automatically listed on online marketplaces, including Amazon, eBay, Buy.com and Best Buy. Optoro also liquidates goods in bulk through its other proprietary website.

== History ==
Optoro was founded as eSpot Deals in 2004 by Tobin "Toby" Moore while he was a student at Brown University. The business was initially run out of an attic above the garage at Moore's house before opening a 1,200-square-foot storefront in Georgetown. Moore and co-founder Adam Vitarello, now Optoro's president, opened one of the first eBay drop off stores in Washington, DC. In 2008, the pair opened an office and warehouse in Lanham, Maryland, where they processed goods from retailers. In 2010, eSpot Deals pivoted away from processing returns directly and incorporated as Optoro, Inc. Tobin and Adam were joined by CTO Jessica Szmajda, and built a new plan to deliver technology solutions to retailers to handle their returned and excess goods. In September 2013, Optoro moved its corporate headquarters to a 13,000-square-foot office in downtown Chinatown, D.C. In June 2016, Optoro moved again to an office space located in the Metro Center neighborhood of Washington, D.C., with double the square footage, holding around 160 people. In February 2021, Optoro shut down its direct-to-consumer eCommerce website, blinq.com. In July 2025, Optoro shut down bulq.com. In August 2025, Optoro was acquired by Blue Yonder, the AI company for supply chain.

== Products and services ==
Optoro's main product is a software-as-a-service called OptiTurn, which is used in retailers' warehouses to sort, process, and resell clients' returned and excess inventory. The software tracks and dispositions inventory as it flows through a warehouse until it reaches consumers. Using OptiTurn, workers mark the conditions of returned products as new, open box, refurbished, or used in good condition. OptiTurn analyzes this, along with other product information, to divert items to the channel that will get retailers the most money back. Possible dispositions include selling directly to consumers, reselling to wholesalers, returning to vendors for repair, donating, or recycling.

OptiTurn lists products with a high resale value automatically on multiple online marketplaces under the BLINQ brand. The software will disposition other goods that will net a higher recovery when sold in bulk to be resold under the BULQ brand on BULQ.com.

== Environment ==
In March 2015, Optoro started a dedicated sustainability team to measure the transportation and waste impacts of the returns industry and the effects that Optoro's solution has on retailers' carbon footprints.

== Financing ==
In July 2013, Optoro received $23.5 million in Series B funding from three primary investors: Revolution LLC, headed by former AOL executives Steve Case, Ted Leonsis, and Donn Davis; Grotech Ventures; and SWaN & Legend Venture Partners, which was co-founded by Fredrick D. Schaufeld. Optoro was Revolution Growth's fifth investment in its "speed-ups" investment fund, which was created to support the growth of newly formed companies and to widen the audience for their products.

In December 2014, Optoro closed $50 million in funding in a Series C round led by Kleiner Perkins Caufield & Byers, a Silicon Valley venture capital firm, as well as Generation Investment Management, a VC company founded by Al Gore. The financing from KPCB came from its Green Growth Fund.

In July 2015, Optoro received $40 million in debt financing from TriplePoint Venture Growth and Square 1 Bank to support scaling its software and its consumer base.

In December 2016, Optoro raised $30 million in Series D funding from UPS, Revolution Growth, Kleiner Perkins Caufield & Byers, Generation Investment Management, Tenfore Holdings, SWaN and Legend Venture Partners and the Maryland Venture Fund.

== Awards ==
- 2013, Deloitte's Technology Fast 500, No. 278
- 2014, Deloitte's Technology Fast 500, No. 229
- 2015, Deloitte's Technology Fast 500, No. 308
- 2015, Washingtonian's 100 Top Tech Leaders, Tobin Moore and Adam Vitarello
- 2015, CNBC Disruptor 50 List, No. 38
- 2015, Ernst & Young's Greater Washington's Entrepreneur of the Year in the Emerging Growth category, Tobin Moore and Adam Vitarello
- 2016, World Economic Forum's Ecolab Award for Circular Economy Enterprise
- 2016, Deloitte's Technology Fast 500, No. 266
