= Sprout Social =

American software developer

Sprout Social, Inc.
- Type: Public
- Traded as: Nasdaq: SPT (Class A); Russell 2000 component
- Industry: Internet
- Founded: 2010; 16 years ago
- Founders: Justyn Howard; Aaron Rankin; Gil Lara; Peter Griffin Soung
- Headquarters: Chicago, Illinois, U.S.
- Area served: Worldwide
- Key people: Ryan Barretto (CEO); Justyn Howard (Chair)
- Products: Social media management Social media marketing Social media customer service Social media analytics
- Revenue: ▲US$458 million (2025)
- Net income: ▲ −US$43.3 million (2025)
- Number of employees: 1,060 (December 2024)
- Website: sproutsocial.com/about/

Sprout Social, Inc. is a technology company that runs a social media management platform. A public company headquartered in Chicago, it was founded in 2010 by Justyn Howard, Aaron Rankin, Gil Lara, and Peter Soung.

== History ==
Headquartered in Chicago, Sprout Social, Inc. was founded in April 2010. The company had raised $60 million by early 2011, including $1 million in a 2010 funding led by Lightbank, $10 million from New Enterprise Associates (NEA) in February 2011, and $42 million from Goldman Sachs Investment Partners and NEA.

In November 2011, Sprout released S2, the second generation of the platform. Among new features were support for multiple users and iPhone functionality. Sprout Social became an official marketing partner with Facebook in July 2012, followed by Twitter in November 2012. Sprout began allowing API integration into Google+ in May 2013.

In August 2015, Sprout launched Bambu by Sprout Social, an employee advocacy platform enabling organizations to curate social media content for employees. Landscape by Sprout Social, a free tool that resizes images for social networks, launched in March 2016. In 2015, Sprout partnered with LinkedIn and Instagram.

Sprout went public on the Nasdaq in 2019.

== Platform ==
Among others, the Sprout Social platform integrates with websites such as Zendesk, UserVoice, Salesforce, Tableau, Canva, and TikTok.

== See also ==
- Digital marketing
- Hootsuite
