= Coffee Meets Bagel =

Dating app

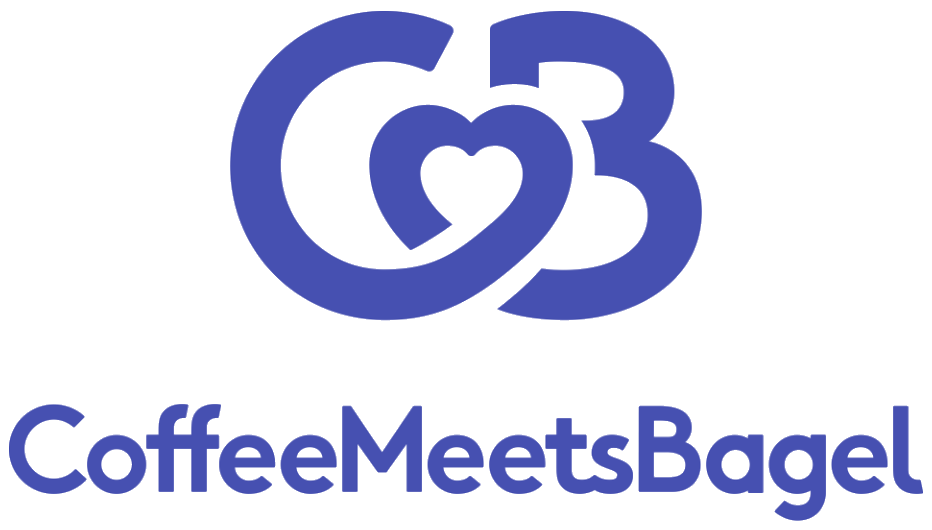
- Type: Private
- Industry: Online dating, Internet
- Founded: April 17, 2012; 14 years ago
- Founders: Arum Kang; Dawoon Kang; Soo Kang
- Key people: Arum Kang (co-CEO); Dawoon Kang (co-CEO)
- Website: coffeemeetsbagel.com

Coffee Meets Bagel is a San Francisco–based dating and social networking service.

== History ==
Coffee Meets Bagel was created by three sisters: Arum, Dawoon, and Soo Kang. Arum first had the idea for the app in 2011, and the sisters launched the app in New York City on April 17, 2012. Coffee Meets Bagel then launched in Boston on May 10, 2012 and in San Francisco on October 24, 2012.

In September 2012, the company announced that it had raised seed funding of $600,000 led by Lightbank, with Match.com co-founder Peng T. Ong also investing.

In January 2015, Coffee Meets Bagel was featured on Shark Tank, where the sisters sought a $500,000 investment in exchange for 5% of the company. They did not make a deal with any of the sharks.

In February 2015, the company announced a $7.8 million Series A financing round led by existing investor DCM Ventures.

In May 2018, the company raised $12 million in Series B funding led by Atami Capital.

As of 2024, Coffee Meets Bagel's net worth is estimated to be over $150 million, and revenue is estimated to be $36 million each year.

=== User personal data breach ===
In February 2019, Coffee Meets Bagel acknowledged that an attacker had stolen "a partial list of user details, specifically names and email addresses" between late 2017 and mid-2018. Outside reporting indicated that as many as 6,174,513 accounts may have been affected and that other details including age and gender may have been taken as well.

=== August 2023 service disruption ===
On August 27, 2023, Coffee Meets Bagel's service became unavailable without warning, with the company's engineers stating that they are dealing with a "system outage". Several users have expressed their dissatisfaction on the popular discussion forum Reddit, citing Coffee Meets Bagel's lack of transparent incident explanation and failure to provide service for multiple days. Additionally, users are concerned about the potential leakage of their personal data.

The service was restored on September 3. In a FAQ, co-founder and co-CEO Dawoon explained that the outage was due to "an outside actor who maliciously deleted company data and files" and that a thorough investigation was launched to understand the full scope of the incident.

== Features ==
Features of the Coffee Meets Bagel app include limiting the number of profiles users can interact with each day and offering ice-breaker information for matches. In 2020, Coffee Meets Bagel added video virtual speed dating in response to the COVID-19 pandemic.

== See also ==
- Comparison of online dating websites
