= The Diary of a CEO =

British podcast

- Genre: Talk
- Format: Audio; video
- Language: English

Cast and voices
- Hosted by: Steven Bartlett

Production
- Production: Steven Bartlett (2017–present)
- Length: 1–2+ hours

Technical specifications
- Video format: YouTube
- Audio format: Podcast (via streaming or downloadable MP3)

Publication
- No. of episodes: 799 (as of February 13, 2026)
- Original release: September 29, 2017
- Provider: Flight Studio

Related
- Website: stevenbartlett.com

YouTube information
- Channel: The Diary of A CEO
- Years active: 2019–present
- Subscribers: 12.1 million
- Views: 850 million
- Last updated: July 19, 2025

The Diary of a CEO is a podcast hosted and produced by British entrepreneur and investor Steven Bartlett. The first episode was released on September 29, 2017. The first interview for the podcast was with fellow CEO Mark Stringer, and Bartlett has since gone on to interview an array of guests. The Diary of a CEO is one of the world's most popular podcasts, regularly receiving millions of views per episode, and topping podcast charts, ranking No. 5 in the Spotify list of most popular podcasts globally in 2024.

== Format ==
The first episode of The Diary of a CEO was released in 2017 and was presented as the first chapter of Bartlett's diary in which he discussed what it takes to be an entrepreneur. Bartlett continued to discuss his own experience for the first five episodes. The first episode in which Bartlett interviewed a guest was the sixth episode, with Mark Stringer, a CEO for a web and design based agency AHOY. Since then, episodes of the podcast commonly follow the format of interviews with celebrities, businessmen and businesswomen, entrepreneurs, actors and politicians.

The podcast is recorded for audio format but is also filmed and uploaded to YouTube.

In August 2021, Bartlett said that he made $1.2 million a year from The Diary of a CEO, and Bartlett stated at the time that his "three key sponsors and other sponsors pay varying fees depending".

In 2024, Bartlett became co-founder and chairman of podcast media and technology company Flight Studio, and Flight Studio became the network for The Diary of a CEO.

The Diary of a CEO started touring live shows in 2021; the first event was hosted in Manchester at the Albert Hall on July 28, 2021.

In October 2026, Bartlett interviewed Ukrainian president Volodymyr Zelenskyy on the podcast.

== Audience ==
In 2022, The Diary of a CEO reached over 10 million downloads in one month, for the first time, and its top three episodes that year all exceeded 3 million downloads. According to Chartable, The Diary of a CEO was the UK's most downloaded podcast on all audio platforms in 2022. According to Edison Podcast Metrics, The Diary of a CEO is the biggest podcast in the UK. The podcast has become the first UK podcast to reach one billion views and listens (across Apple, Spotify and YouTube). The Diary of a CEO was included in the top 5 podcasts globally on Spotify in 2024.

== Reception ==
In March 2025, The Diary of a CEO podcast won the Best International Podcast award at iHeartRadio podcast awards. Forbes reported that the podcast had passed one billion total streams and drew 50 million monthly listeners in December 2024. The same report said Bartlett declined an offer estimated to be worth $100 million to partner with an unnamed streaming platform.

In June 2025, Forbes ranked Bartlett among the world's top 50 digital creators. He placed 9th for earnings and 11th overall. In July 2025, Bartlett was named in Time magazine's inaugural "TIME100 Creators" list – branded by the publication as the 100 most influential digital voices in the world – appearing in the "Leaders" category for his work on The Diary of a CEO.

In December 2025, Spotify announced that Bartlett's podcast The Diary of a CEO had overtaken Joe Rogan to become Britain's most popular on Spotify.

Sarah Manavis for the New Statesman has been critical of The Diary of a CEO, and writes, citing Bartlett's interview with influencer Molly-Mae Hague, that "he was more interested in sharing his own thoughts than listening to hers." In a review for The British Psychological Society magazine The Psychologist in 2022, Imogen Keites is positive and says "Steven explores people's lives in a human way" and writes it is "a podcast about the human mind." The Telegraph said it was "formulaic" but a "stone cold smash."

The Telegraph awarded the show 2/5 stars when it was performed at the London Palladium in 2022 stating "Bartlett hands down well-worn wisdom – work-life balance is tough, relationships need good communication – with the portentousness of Moses unveiling the stone tablets."

In an article for The Times in 2023, James Marriott gave the podcast 2/5 stars and said "The Diary of a CEO is probably best described as a self-help show; encouraging, motivational, vaguely businessy" and wrote "[...] there's also a lot of unearned self-seriousness, a surfeit of platitudes and banal introspection." In a mixed review for The Guardian in 2022, Miranda Sawyer criticised Bartlett's hosting style saying his "manner is superior, as though he, and only he, understands the real truth" but also writing that "each interviewee is immensely happy to be there and willing to spill whatever beans are needed." Sawyer later wrote in a 2023 review for The Guardian that The Diary of a CEO is "a high-class one, hosted by a superb interviewer – but the flimsy format means it's occasionally wobbly."

Wired included The Diary of a CEO on their list of the best podcasts of 2025, describing it as initiating "sprawling discussions." In June 2025, The Times reported that The Diary of a CEO is the fastest growing podcast in the world, adding 300,000–500,000 new subscribers per month.

The New Statesman gave a negative review of The Diary of a CEO with Clive Martin labelling Bartlett's style as "bland" and "pseudo-motivational" and said the podcast is a "fascinating exercise in bluff."

The Diary of a CEO has been criticised for featuring guests associated with alternative medicine whose claims are not supported by scientific evidence or contradict established medical consensus. The podcast has also been criticised for hosting guests who have promoted medical misinformation, with critics noting that such claims were not consistently challenged by the host. In 2024, the BBC World Service investigated these claims, citing an episode in which Bartlett interviewed Aseem Malhotra, a British cardiologist accused of spreading misinformation in opposition to COVID-19 vaccines and criticising Bartlett for not challenging Malhotra and for using clickbait titles related to health. The BBC World Service review analysed 23 health-related episodes released between April and November 2024 and found that 15 contained potentially harmful claims. The investigation also noted that podcasts are not regulated by Ofcom and are therefore not subject to its standards on accuracy and impartiality.

It was also criticised when it hosted Chris Williamson in 2025 who directly criticised the TikTok influencer, 'The Girl With The List'. Williamson said: "I certainly think that there is a anti-family message that comes about, that there's a girl with the list on TikTok, which I think is this girl who wrote 350 reasons to not have kids." A spokesperson for Bartlett responded to the criticism by stating: "Steven Bartlett does not adopt the opinions of his guests, nor is the format intended to pass judgment on personal viewpoints. To suggest that a host is responsible for every view expressed by a guest is a fundamental misunderstanding of the long-form interview format."

== Awards ==
Award	Date	Category	Recipient	Result	Ref.
British Podcast Award	2021	Best Business Podcast	The Diary of a CEO	silver	
iHeart Podcast Awards	2025	Best International Podcast	The Diary of a CEO	Won	
