= Groupon MyCityDeal =

- Website type: Electronic Commerce
- Owner: Groupon
- Website: www.groupon.co.uk
- Commercial: Yes
- Registration: None
- Launched: November 2009
- Current status: Online

Groupon MyCityDeal is a collective buying power, deal-of-the-day website that is focused on bringing discounted price deals in the lifestyle and leisure sector to UK and European markets.

== History ==
Founded in Berlin as CityDeal in November 2009, the collective now serves Germany, France, Spain, Sweden, Austria, the Netherlands, the United Kingdom, Italy, Ireland and Turkey.

The service was acquired in May 2010 by Groupon, an operator of a similar service in the United States, and was co-branded under the Groupon name. The acquisition increased Groupon's operations in European markets.
