= BrainScope Company, Inc. =

Company in Bethesda, United States

- Industry: Medical neurotechnology
- Headquarters: Bethesda, Maryland
- Products: Non-invasive mild traumatic brain injury (concussion) assessment platform
- Website: brainscope.com

BrainScope Company, Inc. (BrainScope) is a medical neuro-technology firm utilizing EEG technology to assess the full spectrum of mild traumatic brain injury (mTBI), including functional injuries (such as a concussion), and structural injuries (such as a brain bleed). BrainScope was founded in 2006 and is headquartered in Bethesda, Maryland.

BrainScope's markets include the military, emergency departments, urgent care clinics, and both collegiate and professional-level sports programs. In November 2023, Brainscope's CEO, Susan L. Hertzberg, was convicted by a jury in federal court in Texas of conspiring to violate the Anti-Kickback Statute.

== Technology ==
BrainScope is a multimodal medical device that provides clinicians with the ability to identify structural and functional mild traumatic brain injuries (mTBIs) in their patients, such as brain bleeds and concussions. It uses electroencephalographic data, artificial intelligence, machine learning technology, cognitive performance and clinical assessments to help identify mTBIs.

The electroencephalographic data that is collected with a disposable electrode headset provides objective biomarkers to both predict the likelihood that a patient's structural brain injury would be visible on a CT scan and assess the likelihood of functional impairment in the brain by comparing the patient's brain function to that of non-head injured individuals. BrainScope also uses neurocognitive tests (Procedural Reaction Time & Match to Sample), which are performed by the patient on the device, as well as using a library of digitized concussion assessments.

An independent validation trial conducted using BrainScope determined that the device's sensitivity to "≥1 mL of blood was ... 98.6%" and that its accurate CT-scan predictions can lead to a "potential reduction in the number of head C.T. scans in the Emergency Department by 31%."

BrainScope's technology was created through 28 clinical studies at over 90 clinical sites spanning over a decade, contributing to 32 investigator-initiated peer-review journal articles and resulting in eight FDA clearances. BrainScope is FDA cleared as an Rx-only device for use on patients 18–85 years of age who have suffered a mild head injury GCS (Glasgow Coma Scale score of 13-15 and mTBI) within the previous 72 hours for its Structural Injury Classifier (SIC) and Brain Function Index (BFI) algorithms. The Concussion Index algorithm is FDA cleared for use on patients 13–25 years of age with a GSC score of 15 and can be used with 72 hours of acute injury, for baseline and throughout recovery. BrainScope was originally cleared by the FDA as the Ahead 300 under 510(k) K161068 in September 2016. Subsequent modifications to device Indications for Use regarding concussion/mTBI capabilities were FDA cleared under 510(k) K181179 in May 2018.

The company initiated a clinical research study on patients 13–25 years of age in May 2018 as part of its initiative to "introduce a teenage-focused product in the near-term."

== Partners ==
BrainScope has raised over $60 million in private capital and has received $30 million in research contracts, including funding from the United States Department of Defense and General Electric and the National Football League through their Head Health Challenge competition. Among the company's private investors are Revolution LLC, an investment firm founded by AOL co-founder Steve Case; DBL Partners, a venture capital firm that also backs Tesla and Pandora; and the Maryland Venture Fund.

BrainScope's other development partners include New York University School of Medicine and Johns Hopkins University, and its clinical partners include Emory University, the University of Virginia and Washington University in St. Louis.

== Awards ==
- Winner of the 2017 Frost & Sullivan Best Practices Award - Traumatic Brain Injury New Product Innovation
- Finalist for the 2017 Prix Galien Foundation USA Award for Best Medical Technology Product
- Greater Washington Health & Life Sciences 2017 Innovator of the Year
- Winner of the 2017 Moxie Award for Healthcare
- Maryland Emerging Life Science 2016 Business of the Year
- Two-time winner of the GE NFL Head Health Challenge, 2014 and 2015
- 2012 Montgomery County Chamber of Commerce Verl Zanders Emerging Business of the Year
