= Ketone-IQ =

American supplement company

- Type: Private
- Industry: Nutrition
- Founders: Geoffrey Woo, Michael Brandt
- Headquarters: San Francisco
- Area served: United States
- Key people: Jon Jones (Co-owner) Steven Bartlett (Co-owner)
- Website: ketone.com

Ketone-IQ is an American company that specializes in manufacturing and distributing a ketone drink. Previously known as Health Via Modern Nutrition, Inc or "HVMN", the company re-branded itself as Ketone-IQ in May 2024.

== History ==
The company was founded as Nootrobox in 2014 by Geoffrey Woo and Michael Brandt. While forming the company Woo was an Entrepreneur in residence at venture capital firm Foundation Capital, while Brandt worked as a Google employee, a freelance photographer, and an adjunct professor at the Academy of Art University.

In October 2015, the company announced that Silicon Valley angel investors including Marissa Mayer and Mark Pincus had invested $500,000 in the company. In December 2015, Andreessen Horowitz led a $2 million venture capital round in the company. Chris Dixon, who has experience at companies like Soylent, led the investment for Andreessen Horowitz.

In August 2016, the company partnered with 7-Eleven locations in San Francisco. In January 2017, Woo and Brandt were named to Forbes 30 Under 30 in Consumer Technology. In June 2017, the company changed its name to H.V.M.N., "Health Via Modern Nutrition". In 2018, HVMN products affiliated with United States Special Operations Command were tested as part of Operation Tech Warrior hosted at the National Center for Medical Readiness. In 2023, HVMN launched in nationwide grocery retail in Sprouts Farmers Market.

In 2024, the company re-branded itself as Ketone-IQ and ketone.com, which is the name of the company's primary product. Ketone-IQ signed a three year partnership with Visma–Lease a Bike (men's team), a UCI World Tour team.

In 2025, Ketone-IQ brought on podcaster Steven Bartlett and UFC fighter Jon Jones as co-owners of the company. As of that date, Ketone-IQ is distributed nationwide in Target, Sprouts, and other retailers.

== Studies and results ==
In September 2018, HVMN was the nutrition sponsor for cyclist Vittoria Bussi, who broke the UCI Hour record using HVMN Ketone Ester drinks (not Ketone-IQ drinks) in the training run up and on the day of the record. In the 2019 Tour de France, multiple cycling teams including Team Jumbo–Visma and Lotto–Soudal confirmed use of ketone ester for performance and recovery.

In 2019, the United States Special Operations Command awarded HVMN a $6M research contract for a two-phase study to investigate impact of ketone esters (not Ketone-IQ drinks) on soldier performance at altitude, in mountains, on fighter jets, and in space, and researching how ketone esters impact cognition, physiological reserve, and oxygen availability under stressors like hypoxia.

== Culture ==
In 2016 the company instituted a weekly intermittent fasting day for staff. This was in line with a fad among Silicon Valley companies and workers at that time to use biohacking techniques in the workplace.
