= Tige Savage =

American investor (born 1968)

- Born: September 30, 1968 (age 57); Boulder, Colorado, United States
- Education: University of Michigan
- Occupations: Co-founder, Managing Partner, Investor

Tige Savage (born September 30, 1968) is an American investor, co-founder of Revolution LLC, a principal investment firm based in Washington, D.C., and a managing partner at Revolution Ventures, which has made investments in companies such as Bloomscape, BrightCellars, Casted, GoodBuy Gear, Mint House, Policygenius, Sila and Wagmo. He was a key investor in LivingSocial in its founding years.

== Career ==
Savage was an executive at Riggs National Corporation in the mid-1990s; he simultaneously served on the board of directors of Allbritton Communications Company. From 1998 to 2000, he managed technology and media sector investments as executive vice president of Riggs Capital Partners.

From 2001 to 2003, Savage managed investments in technology and media companies as vice president of Time Warner Ventures.

In 2005, Savage co-founded Revolution with partners Steve Case and Donn Davis; Savage leads Revolution's early-stage venture capital investing activities as managing partner of Revolution Ventures.

Savage was named one of Washington, DC's “100 Top Tech Titans” by Washingtonian Magazine in 2011, 2018, 2019, 2021 and 2024. In 2013 he was named Financier of the Year at the Northern Virginia Technology Council Annual Awards. Savage has been interviewed by The Wall Street Journal, Business Insider, MIT Technology Review, The Motley Fool, Consumer VC and This Week in Venture Capital about Revolution's investment philosophy. In 2024, he was featured in INNOVATE® Washington DMV Edition as a Top 100 Innovator.

Savage was credited for his role in developing LivingSocial's strategy in a profile of the company in The Washington Post. In 2012, he wrote an online review of e-commerce technology platforms.

== Life and education ==
Savage holds a Masters in Business Administration from the University of Michigan's Ross School of Business and a Bachelor of Arts degree from James Madison University. He was born in Boulder, Colorado.

== Board seats ==
Savage currently holds seats on the Board of Directors of Aiwyn, Mint House, Place Exchange and ProRata.ai, among other companies. Previous Board seats include Framebridge (acquired by Graham Holdings Co.) Homesnap (acquired by CoStar), LivingSocial (acquired by Groupon), Zipcar and Flexcar (acquired by Avis), HelloWallet (acquired by MorningStar and most recently by KeyCorp), OrderUp (acquired by Groupon), Booker (acquired by MindBody) and Revolution Money, (acquired by American Express).
