= Steven Bartlett (businessman) =

British businessman and podcaster (born 1992)

- Born: Steven Cliff Bartlett; 26 August 1992 (age 34); Gaborone, Botswana
- Occupation: businessman, podcaster
- Known for: Social Chain; Dragons' Den; The Diary of a CEO; Thirdweb
- Awards: Forbes 30 Under 30 (2020); Time 100 Creators (2025)

YouTube information
- Channel: The Diary of a CEO
- Years active: 2019–present
- Genre: Podcasting
- Subscribers: 19.1 million
- Views: 1.69 billion
- Last updated: 17 August 2026
- Website: stevenbartlett.com

Steven Cliff Bartlett (born 26 August 1992) is a British businessman, investor, and podcaster who is the host of The Diary of a CEO podcast since 2017.

Bartlett began his business career by founding Social Chain. In 2021, he began appearing as an investor on the BBC One show Dragons' Den. He is the founder of FlightStory Studio, FlightStory Fund, Thirdweb, and Steven.com.

== Early life ==
Steven Cliff Bartlett was born on 26 August 1992 in Gaborone, Botswana to an English father and a Nigerian mother. His father is a structural engineer. Steven moved with his family to Plymouth, England, at age two. There, he grew up, attending a secondary school, Plymstock School, from which he was expelled in sixth form. He went to study at Manchester Metropolitan University, but dropped out after one lecture.

== Career ==
=== Business and investment ===
In 2013, Bartlett founded Wallpark, an online messaging board.

In 2014, he and Dominic McGregor co-founded Social Chain, a social media marketing company based in Manchester. In 2019, Social Chain merged with Lumaland (an online retailer) to become Social Chain AG. In 2019, the Financial Times reported that Bartlett and Wanja Oberhof would jointly manage Social Chain AG. In 2020 Bartlett and McGregor left the company. Bartlett stepped down as CEO in 2020 because he did not agree on the direction of the company. In July 2023, Social Chain AG filed for insolvency proceedings under self-administration. The insolvency proceedings in self-administration were opened by the Charlottenburg Local Court on 1 October 2023, leading to the liquidation of its remaining assets, including the sale of its largest e-commerce subsidiary, DS Group, back to its existing shareholders in November 2023. Bartlett's website initially said that he founded a $600 million company. However, The Times reported that Bartlett had left the business at the time of the second listing, and was no longer affiliated with the company for at least 15 months.

Later, Bartlett founded Thirdweb, a Web3 startup. In August 2022, the company raised $24 million in a Series A funding round at a valuation of $160 million.

In 2023, Bartlett founded FlightStory. It comprises FlightStory Studio, a media production company and FlightStory Fund, an investment fund. The fund supports founders and high-growth start-ups in blockchain, biotech, health, commerce, technology, and space sectors. According to a report in The Times, Flight Fund had received criticism over a lack of transparency regarding its portfolio. In December 2025, Flight Story announced a seven-figure investment in Hot Smart Rich (HSR), a business founded by podcaster Maggie Sellers Reum.

In May 2025, Bartlett became a co-owner of US technology company Stan Store, a platform designed to help creator entrepreneurs launch and manage online businesses.

In September 2025, Bartlett became a co-owner of US ketone drink company Ketone-IQ.

In October 2025, Bartlett's company, Steven.com, which holds his creator media assets and creator-focused ventures, closed an eight-figure investment round, and was described in media reports as the largest fundraising round by a European creator holding company. Following the investment, Bartlett retained an ownership stake of more than 90% in the company.

=== The Diary of a CEO podcast ===
Bartlett has produced The Diary of a CEO podcast since 2017, in which he interviews guests. By the early 2020s, The Diary of a CEO was considered ambiently listenable fluff. In 2023, according to a podcast chart, The Diary of a CEO had the second-largest weekly audience in the United Kingdom. Bartlett has been described as taking a largely apolitical stance on the podcast.

Bartlett has received significant criticism for promoting pseudoscience and amplifying dangerous health-related claims to his podcast and video audience, including stating that a ketogenic diet can treat cancer, or that Covid was an "engineered weapon". The BBC World Service performed an investigation wherein 15 of Bartlett's health-focused podcasts were analyzed; the results of this investigation found that each episode included approximately 14 dangerous health claims contrary to scientific evidence. He has been criticised for having alternative medicine-related guests on his podcast whose assertions are not backed by, or contradict, scientific evidence, and having other guests who promote medical misinformation without the claims being consistently challenged by Bartlett.

=== Dragons' Den ===
Bartlett joined the long-running investment reality television program, Dragons' Den, in 2021. He was one of the five titular "dragon" investors to which aspiring entrepreneurs pitch their ideas/products and at the time the youngest to appear on the show. On the show, Bartlett has invested in companies such as plant-based dog-food brand Omni, matcha energy-drink maker PerfectTed and allergy-response start-up Kitt Medical.

In March 2023, matcha brand PerfectTed appeared on the BBC programme Dragons' Den and accepted an offer from Steven Bartlett for £25,000 in exchange for 5% equity. Following the broadcast, Bartlett invested an additional £1 million. By 2025, the company was reported as one of the expanding founder-led businesses in the United Kingdom, with a valuation of around £140 million.

In 2024, Bartlett was criticised for investing in "Ear Seeds," an acupuncture product pitched on the programme which falsely claimed to be able to cure myalgic encephalomyelitis/chronic fatigue syndrome, a debilitating, chronic condition. The BBC later added a disclaimer in the episode, stating the "Ear Seeds" were not intended as a cure, and medical guidance should be followed.

=== Other activities ===
In 2019, he featured in the Channel 4 series The Secret Teacher, going undercover at a school near Liverpool as a teacher.

In 2020, he created the private equity company Catena Capital.

== Advertising guidelines breaches ==
The BBC, which currently airs Dragons' Den, reprimanded Bartlett in 2022 for breaching BBC guidelines on advertising after wearing jewellery on the programme of a brand he promoted in posts on social media. In a statement, they told the Radio Times: "We have clear guidelines around talents' commercial activity while working with us. Steven has been reminded of the guidelines." In a statement, Bartlett addressed the issue, adding: "This was a genuine oversight on my part. The posts have now been taken down."

The Advertising Standards Authority (ASA) took action against Bartlett in August 2022 for breaching the CAP Code (Edition 12) rules 2.1, 2.3 and 2.4, in which he advertised the meal replacement firm Huel on his The Diary of a CEO podcast without clearly disclosing its nature as an advertisement. The ASA ruled that the advertisement must not appear again in its current form and subsequently advised Bartlett and Huel to "ensure that they made clear the commercial intent of advertising content in podcasts in future, for example by including a conspicuous identifier such as 'advertisement' and making sure the break from editorial content to the ad was clearly and audibly identified."

In August 2024, advertisements featuring Bartlett by Zoe and Huel were banned by the advertising standards authority because they did not properly disclose their relationship with Bartlett.

== Public image ==
In 2020, Bartlett was inducted into the Manchester Hall of Fame. In the same year, he was included in the Forbes 30 Under 30 list. In 2025, Bartlett was included in the inaugural Time 100 digital creator list. Bartlett's reputation among the general public has been described as polarising. Writing in The Independent, Zoë Beaty suggested that "all kinds of people will tell you they think he's a "narcissist," a "grifter," "a hustler," describing him as part of an "emergent culture of marginally successful people deciding they're experts on everything" with Nick Stylianou calling Bartlett "a pseudo-intellectual."

Feminist writer Jessica Valenti said of Bartlett that "they don’t see women as people" and alleged that he produces "incel propaganda dressed up as intellectual debate." YouTuber Therese Lee suggested that "Steven Bartlett serves as a Trojan horse for the manosphere."

In September 2023, Bartlett accompanied William, Prince of Wales, on Royal visits in Bournemouth after being announced as an advocate of his foundation, Homewards. In March 2025, Bartlett joined the Prince of Wales on a visit to Aberdeen as part of the Homewards initiative, where they met with youth supported by local homelessness prevention programmes and businesses involved in the project.

In 2025, Bartlett was named among the UK's most notable Black people on the Powerlist 2026, the list recognises notable individuals of African, African Caribbean, and African American heritage in the United Kingdom.

In March 2026, Bartlett's podcast, The Diary of a CEO, won the award for Best Business & Finance Podcast at the 8th annual iHeart Podcast Awards.

== Personal life ==
In 2023, Bartlett was diagnosed with ADHD.

In December 2025, Bartlett became engaged to his long-term partner from France, Mélanie Lopes. He confirmed the engagement publicly in January 2026 during an appearance on the Hot Smart Rich podcast.

== Books ==
- Bartlett, Steven (2021). Happy Sexy Millionaire: Unexpected Truths About Fulfilment, Love and Success. London: Yellow Kite. p. 272. ISBN 978-1529301496.
- Bartlett, Steven (2023). The Diary of a CEO: The 33 Laws of Business and Life. London: Ebury Publishing. p. 368. ISBN 978-1529192742.
