= Lolly Wolly Doodle =

Online clothing brand

- Company type: Private
- Industry: Children's and women's clothing
- Founded: 2008; 18 years ago in Lexington, North Carolina, US
- Founder: Brandi Tysinger-Temple
- Headquarters: Lexington, North Carolina, US
- Number of locations: 4
- Area served: US
- Key people: Sherry Frydenlund, CEO; Dan Frydenlund, directors
- Revenue: $11 million
- Number of employees: 250
- Website: www.lollywollydoodle.com

Lolly Wolly Doodle was an American company that manufactures women's and children's clothing for sale online. It was founded in 2008 in Lexington, North Carolina, and is now owned by investment firm Stage Fund. After investments by venture capitalists such as Revolution Growth, it expanded to include production facilities in New York City. Most of its products are sold through via Facebook.

== History ==
=== 2006–08: eBay ===
The company was founded in 2008 by Brandi Temple. Dissatisfied with the clothing options available for young girls in retail stores and reluctant to pay boutique prices, Temple began sewing clothes for her daughters.

Realizing she had an excess of fabric after a sewing session, Temple offered additional clothing items in the same style for sale on eBay, rather than let the material be wasted.

The company name, Lolly Wolly Doodle, was derived from a children's song "Polly Wolly Doodle" and was a nickname Temple used for her niece named Lolly. By the end of 2008, the eBay store was consistently supplementing Temple's household income, leading her to officially incorporate Lolly Wolly Doodle.

=== 2008–10: Move to Facebook ===
In 2010, the company sent patterns to a Chinese company for quality evaluation, but the received dresses did not meet their standards. As a result, these dresses were offered at a discounted price on the company's Facebook page instead of their usual eBay store.

According to a 2013 interview with Bloomberg News, Brandi Temple said that they sold out the discounted dresses quickly on Facebook, generating more sales in one day than they typically did on eBay in a month. Consequently, the company transitioned their online store from eBay to Facebook.

=== 2010–12: Expansion ===
As the company expanded, Temple considered selling the company due to its rapid growth. She was connected with New York venture capitalist Shana Fisher of High Line Venture Partners, an early supporter of successful startups like MakerBot, Vine and Pinterest. Fisher advised Temple that she had significantly undervalued the company, suggesting it could be worth as much as $100 million.

Fisher then invested $100,000 and organized a seed round of funding that raised $1.4 million. This capital enabled the move of LWD's production from Temple's home to a 4,000-square-foot former tire warehouse in Lexington.

Emily Hickey, formerly of HotJobs, joined as the company's chief operating officer. The company continued to grow, prompting a move to a 19,000-square-foot facility by September 2012. By then, LWD had amassed 300,000 Facebook fans.

=== 2013–2017: Revolution investment ===
The success of Lolly Wolly Doodle on Facebook attracted attention from business and tech media, particularly as other businesses such as JCPenney pulled back their operations on the same platform. Kara Swisher noted LWD's innovative flash sale-like approach with just-in-time retail elements. In 2013 Business Insider listed the companies' founders, Brandi Temple and Emily Hickey, among its "30 Startup People To Watch This Year".

In June 2013, Steve Case, founder of AOL, invested $20 million in the company through his venture capital firm, Revolution LLC. Case and another former AOL executive, Donn Young, joined the Lolly Wolly Doodle board of directors. The funds were primarily used to move to a larger production facility and to launch a mobile app and extend sales to Instagram and Pinterest.

In 2013 the company generated $11 million in revenue. By 2014, it had four facilities and 250 employees. The primary focus for 2014 was developing customized software to optimize the company's operations.

In September 2017, Lolly Wolly Doodle was acquired by Dan Frydenlund, the CEO of Stage Fund.

=== 2018: Outsourcing ===
Lolly Wolly Doodle discontinued manufacturing in Lexington, North Carolina, and moved most of the manufacturing overseas, and moved operation to other US cities, including Atlanta.

== Business model ==
Despite selling through various online platforms, including its own website and other social networks, it is estimated that Lolly Wolly Doodle conducts about 80 percent of its business via its Facebook page. Since larger, established retailers have mostly been unable to generate significant sales from their Facebook presence, e-commerce analysts have studied Lolly Wolly Doodle's business model to understand its success.

Once an order is processed, the garment is manufactured using the just-in-time production method:

If traditional garment manufacturing is a pretty straightforward assembly-line affair, the seamstresses at Lolly work more like short-order cooks in a diner where the menu changes daily. In one room, a dozen people cut fabric according to order tickets that flow through in real time—15 size-2 aqua chevron Charlotte dresses here, a single size-6 salmon Ruffle dress there. On the sewing floor, efficiency comes from how the orders are bundled (not necessarily by garment or size but, because many items share attributes, by the type of sewing required) and minimizing how many people or machines have to touch a garment.

Donn Davis, a former America Online executive now on Lolly Wolly Doodle's board, says that Temple has "reinvent[ed] apparel much as Dell reinvented the PC industry. It's affordable custom [manufacturing] in real time with little inventory risk."

Analysts suggest that Lolly Wolly Doodle primarily benefits from the social feedback loop on Facebook, which significantly informs its marketing and inventory management strategies. The feedback from customers eliminates the need for traditional market research and informs the design choices, helping to identify successful designs and discard less popular ones. Popular designs move into larger-scale production, with some outsourced overseas. This approach minimizes overstock issues often faced by traditional retailers.

However, some observers note potential limitations. The model largely works due to Lolly Wolly Doodle's manageable scale, and the requirement for customers to post their email addresses in comments for orders could potentially invite inappropriate use of information. Despite these reservations, some other companies have adopted similar business models, demonstrating the potential broader application of this strategy.

== Brands ==
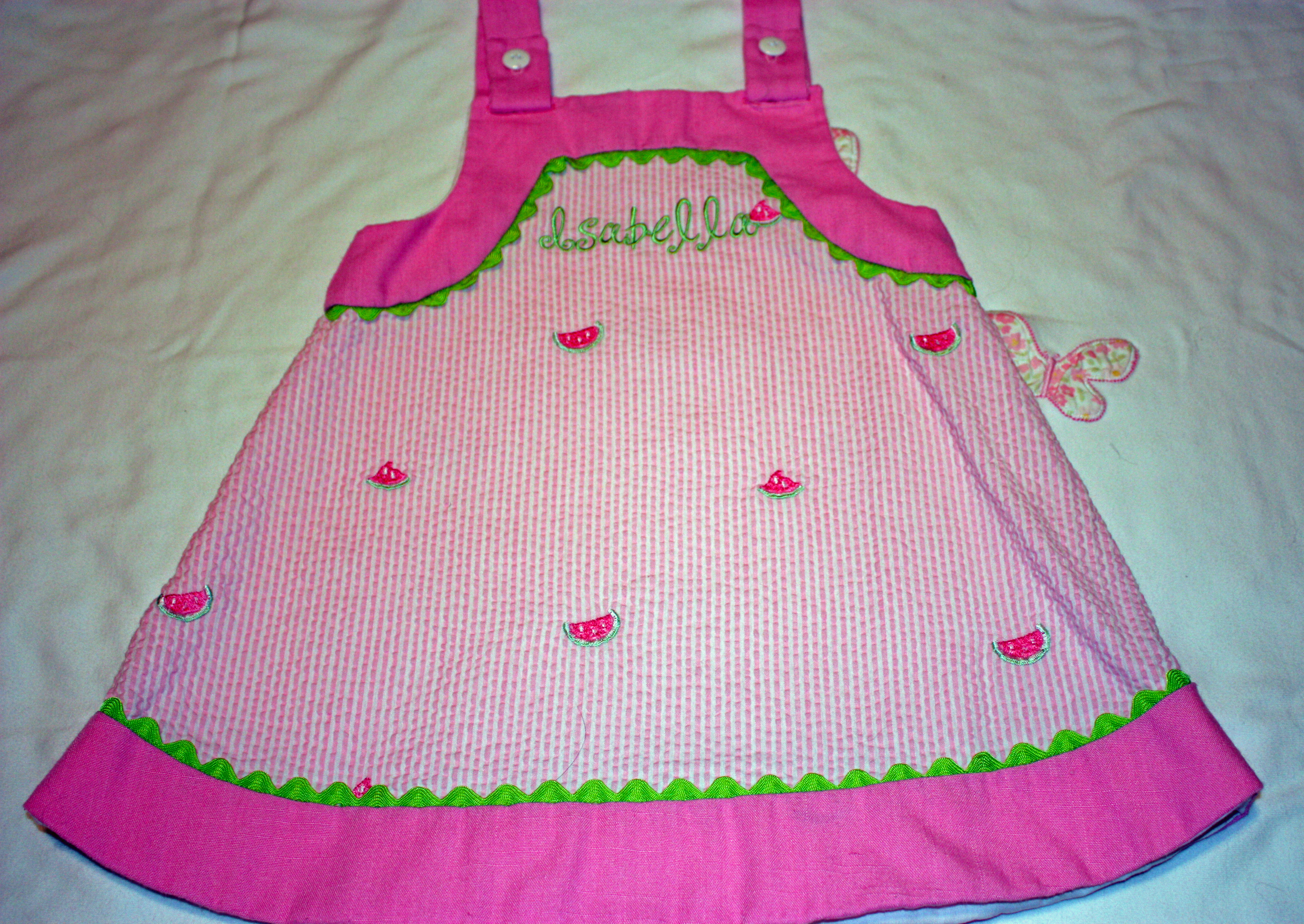
Dress made by Lolly Wolly Doodle

The company uses the Lolly Wolly Doodle name for most of its lines. For girls, it makes primarily dresses and capri sets, with a few swimwear pieces. Boys' clothingis primarily shortalls, T-shirt sets and bathing trunks. An extensive babywear line is complemented with tops, skirts and dresses (primarily maxi length) for adult women.

The company also offers customized clothing via their Designed by Me service. Users of the website choose details of a girls' dress; it is then made and shipped to them within three weeks. A Facebook login is required.

== See also ==
- List of companies of the United States by state § North Carolina
