= Geoffrey Woo =

American businessman (born 1988)

- Education: Stanford University (BS, Computer Science)
- Occupations: Founder of Anti Fund; Founder of Ketone-IQ; Founder of Archive.com
- Known for: Ketone bodies; Nootropics; Venture Capital
- Website: geoffreywoo.com

Geoffrey Woo is an American entrepreneur and venture capitalist who is the founder of Ketone-IQ, Archive, and Anti Fund, a venture capital firm he co-founded with Jake Paul. Anti Fund has assets under management of over $180 million.

== Education and early life ==
Woo was born in and grew up in Los Angeles and attended Palos Verdes Peninsula High School. The minor planet 21714 Geoffreywoo is named after Woo for being a finalist in the 2006 Intel ISEF. USA Today named Woo to its All-USA High School Academic Team and Woo was recognized as a semi-finalist in the US Presidential Scholars Program in 2007. Woo graduated Stanford University with a bachelor's degree in Computer Science.

== Career ==
=== Glassmap ===
Woo was co-founder and CEO of Glassmap, a realtime mobile location tracking application. He dropped out of Stanford's computer science graduate program with two Stanford engineers to start the company, which was funded by Y Combinator in 2011. Groupon acquired the business in January 2013.

=== Ketone-IQ ===
In 2014, Woo co-founded Ketone-IQ, a ketone drink company. Andreessen Horowitz led the company's seed financing round in December 2015. At the time, the company was called Nootrobox. The company was featured on Shark Tank Season 8 in 2016. Woo was named to Forbes 30 Under 30 in Consumer Technology in 2017 for this work.

=== Archive ===
Woo is a co-founder and chairman of Archive, a technology company that manages user-generated content and online communities for brands. In November 2021, Archive announced a $4 million seed funding round led by Stripe. In March 2022, the company secured an additional $8 million in funding through a seed extension round co-led by Tiger Global and Human Capital. This funding round elevated the company's post-money valuation to $100 million, bringing the total funding to $12 million since its inception in March 2021.

=== Anti Fund ===
Woo partnered with Jake Paul, an American YouTuber and professional boxer, to found Anti Fund, an early stage venture capital firm in March 2021. In August 2021, Anti Fund co-led a $30M financing in sports gambling technology firm Simplebet. In August 2024, Draftkings announced it would be acquiring Simplebet. In August 2022, Anti Fund incubated Betr, a sports gaming app that Jake Paul cofounded and where Woo is a Founding Partner and Board Director. Anti Fund subsequently participated in a $50M Series A financing round. In June 2023, Anti Fund invested in Betr's $35M Series A2. In March 2024, Betr announced a $15M round that valued the company at $375M.

In August 2022, Anti Fund invested in Anduril Industries, an American defense company specializing in autonomous systems. In 2023, Anti Fund invested in Aerodome, a public safety drone-As-first-responder technology company. Flock Safety acquired Aerodome in October 2024, in a deal TechCrunch reported was valued at more than $300 million.

In June 2024, Anti Fund incubated W, a men's personal care brand with products priced at less than $10 with retail partner Walmart. In July 2024, the Wall Street Journal reported that W has raised over $14M in venture capital funding from Shrug Capital and others including tennis star Naomi Osaka at a valuation over $150M.

In December 2025, Anti Fund closed its first institutional fund, the oversubscribed $30 million Anti Fund I, bringing the firm's assets under management to more than $65 million at the time, and named Logan Paul as a general partner. In June 2026, The New York Times DealBook reported that Anti Fund had closed its first growth capital fund at $100 million, increasing the firm's assets under management to $180 million. That month, Anti Fund participated as a new investor in fusion energy company Helion Energy's $465 million Series G round, which was led by Thrive Capital and valued Helion at $15.5 billion.

== Publications and patents ==
Woo has co-authored several peer-reviewed articles focusing mainly on ketones and their potential applications and benefits in human physiology and recovery. He co-authored a number of US patents including inventions relating to consumer grouping systems, mobile device location determination, and nutritional compositions related to human performance.

== Personal interests ==
Woo is noted for undertaking various challenges and dietary practices, including a 7-day water-only fast, consecutive daily fitness challenges, and experimenting with different diets, including the carnivore and ketogenic diets.
