= ACSOI =

ACSOI (Adjusted Consolidated Segment Operating Income) (also called Adjusted CSOI) is a non-GAAP accounting metric.

The metric amortizes marketing and acquisition costs over several accounting periods. The "Adjusted" part of the metric increases ("inflates") a company's reported net income in the most recent accounting period. The rationale behind the use of ACSOI is that marketing and subscriber acquisition expenses have value long into the future: they build a brand; therefore, they should be spread out over time. Cash spent on marketing is not expensed: it is converted into another asset ("subscriber acquisition assets, net") on a company's balance sheet.

This presentation of net income is prohibited by the Financial Accounting Standards Board, arbiters of GAAP (Generally Accepted Accounting Principles) in the United States. In GAAP, marketing expenses may be accrued in some situations as prepaid expenses, but only amortized in special cases. Deferred acquisition costs are typically only allowed for amortizing the acquisition costs of customers in businesses like insurance, where the amortization occurs over the well-defined duration of a contract. ACSOI can be a useful internal metric for businesses to determine financial performance and to make strategic management decisions, if they believe their subscriber acquisition costs are an up-front cash outlay that truly builds long-term customer assets commensurate with that outlay. A main argument for not using this metric in GAAP accounting is that there is a key difference between subscribers and customers: customers make purchases and generate revenue for the business; it may be faulty to assume that all subscriber acquisition costs can be amortized as assets if only an unknown portion of the acquired subscribers will actually convert to customers.

The use of ACSOI came under scrutiny in August 2011, when it was revealed the company Groupon used the metric to present a net gain in operating income in their IPO filing. Without the ACSOI metric, Groupon would have stated a net loss.
