= Matt Carson (author) =

American entrepreneur and author

- Born: October 14, 1975 (age 50); Warrenton, Virginia, U.S.
- Education: West Virginia University
- Occupations: Entrepreneur, Author
- Website: www.outsiderlabs.com

Matthew "Matt" Carson (born October 14, 1975) is an American entrepreneur and author from Virginia. Carson's works include The Attic, A Christmas Story and On A Hill They Call Capital. In 2009 he ran as an independent candidate for Virginia House of Delegates, 30th District seat, losing to the Republican incumbent.

== Biography ==
Born in Warrenton, Virginia, Matt Carson is a graduate of Fauquier High School and holds a degree in political science and history from West Virginia University. As a student, he was the founder of the SRA (Student Rights Administration) in 1997, a group that gained national media attention by battling the then president of the university, David Hardesty, for his "dry fraternity" initiatives and for attempting to cut back on student tailgating at football games by instituting a "no keg" ruling. Carson was arrested by Morgantown police for some of his on-campus antics.

Carson was also a writer for The Daily Athenaeum at the time, the WVU student newspaper, and gained attention for his often hilarious pro-party rants and for citing his determination at restoring WVU as the "number one party school in the nation" as ranked by Playboy.

After graduating, he worked at Oasis Winery with owner Tareq Salahi in an effort to learn the wine business. Carson was originally slated to write the Salahi story involving the winery family feud, the Virginia polo murder, and the rise of the Virginia wine business to be titled Wine, War, & Roses. The Real Housewives of Washington, D.C. filmed a book meeting at Carson's Virginia home with the Salahis one week prior to the alleged White House Gatecrashing incident. Soon after the White House incident Carson walked away from the project.

After Oasis he co-founded Bigteams. He currently serves on the board of the Middleburg Film Festival and as CEO of Britches Great Outdoors.

Carson was also featured in the infamous The Men of Rappahannock County partially nude calendar that gained national attention as a fundraiser for a local high school track field. He appeared in the calendar along with Ben L. Jones, aka, Cooter from the Dukes of Hazzard television show.

== On A Hill They Call Capital ==
The second literary work of Matt Carson, On A Hill They Call Capital: A Revolution Is Coming, published on July 4, 2007, is a satirical story of 8 Virginians in their late twenties who mount a revolution against the U.S. Federal Government out of frustration with the Patriot Act. These 8 Virginians call themselves the Grandsons of Liberty after the Sons of Liberty.

The book has received praise from such sources as The Washington Post journalist Joel Garreau and Julie Failla Earhart of Armchair Interviews.

When a band of good ol boys from Virginia decide that American liberties have been breached once too often, the resulting revolution they launch is both clever and informed by a sense of irony that only true country boys can pull off. Matt Carson has written a story populated by great characters and an ingenious plot. Watch out for this budding story teller.

— Joel Garreau

== 2009 Virginia elections candidacy ==
Matt Carson ran as an independent against the Republican incumbent Ed Scott in November's race for the 30th District seat in the Virginia House of Delegates. In his first campaign for public office he gained 25% of the vote, losing to the incumbent. The main points of his political campaign were the support for a Patriot Act free state, fiscal responsibility at state level, protection of inalienable rights of individuals, and an environmentally friendly approach.

== Bibliography ==
- Matt Carson. (2007). On A Hill They Call Capital: A Revolution is Coming. ISBN 978-1-60402-854-6
- Matthew Amick (original penname of Matt Carson). (1999). The Attic: A Christmas Story. ISBN 978-0-9675024-0-3
