= Uptake (business) =

Industrial artificial intelligence company in Chicago, IL, US

Uptake Technologies
- Company type: Private
- Founded: 2014; 12 years ago
- Founder: Brad Keywell
- Headquarters: Chicago, Illinois
- Area served: Worldwide
- Services: Predictive analytics
- Number of employees: 250-500
- Website: uptake.com

Uptake is an industrial artificial intelligence (AI) software company. Built around a foundation of data science and machine learning, Uptake’s core products include an Asset Performance Management application and a fully managed platform.

Uptake’s industry-specific content, including its Asset Strategy Library (ASL), provides guidance on failure prevention. The ASL is the largest in the market today with approximately 800 equipment types, over 58,000 failure modes and over 180,000 reportable conditions.

Uptake was founded by Brad Keywell in Chicago, Illinois in 2014.

== Business ==
Uptake was incorporated in 2014 and is located in Chicago, with offices in San Francisco, Houston, Albuquerque, Riyadh, and Mississauga.

In March 2015, Caterpillar announced its minority investment in Uptake, with the aim of the joint development of systems to monitor and improve use of the nearly 3 million pieces of Caterpillar equipment in the field. Caterpillar’s core business offerings were completed in mid 2016. On September 21, 2016, Progress Rail formed a strategic partnership, launching EMD Uptime, with Uptake for condition monitoring. On March 2, 2017, Warren Buffett's Berkshire Hathaway Energy, an $84 billion portfolio of companies primarily in the renewables space, announced a deal with Uptake. Two of BHE's subsidiaries, BHE Renewables and MidAmerican Energy Company, now use Uptake's software to connect and track their fleet of wind turbines.

In June 2018, Uptake announced the U.S. Army would be using its software to improve the readiness of a few dozen of its Bradley Fighting Vehicles.

In February 2018, Uptake announced the hire of Ganesh Bell, former chief digital officer at General Electric, as President.

In June 2019, Uptake announced Ganesh Bell would step down as President.

In September 2020, Uptake announced that Kayne Grau would become its President. In October 2021, the company announced Grau would become CEO and that Founder Brad Keywell would become Executive Chairman of the Board.

== Financing ==
On October 27, 2015, Uptake announced that it had raised $45 million in venture capital led by GreatPoint Ventures and existing investors including New Enterprise Associates and Caterpillar. Uptake’s valuation was estimated to be one billion dollars, making it the third unicorn in the state of Illinois. On February 1, 2017 investor Revolution Growth, a firm started by Steve Case, Donn Davis and Ted Leonsis, announced that they would be backing Uptake with $40 million as part of the Series C round. This valued Uptake at $2 billion. In November 2017, Uptake closed a Series D round of $117 million at a post-money valuation of $2.3 billion. That brought Uptake's total funding to over $250 million.
