= Ideel =

American online retailer

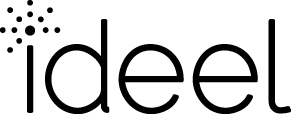
- Type: Subsidiary
- Industry: E-commerce
- Founded: 2006; 20 years ago
- Headquarters: New York City, United States
- Key people: Lisa Kennedy; Saurabh Sharma; Alain Demour; Simon Black; Sarah Liebel; Cecelia Myers
- Products: Apparel & Home
- Parent: Groupon
- Website: www.groupon.com/occasion/ideel

Ideel, formerly ideeli, is a flash sale based online retailer based in New York City.

== History and operations ==
Founded in 2006, its $77 million in revenue in 2010 led Inc. to rank it as the fastest growing company in the United States for 2011. In August 2012, Ideeli moved from Soho to the 45th floor of the New York Times Building. It has raised $70 million in venture capital funding.

Ideel's business model is based on acquiring excess or sample merchandise and selling it quickly at very steep discounts to their members. Sales typically last less than 48 hours. In 2014 they rebranded themselves as a source for affordable designer clothing.

In January 2014, Groupon bought Ideel for $43 million. At some point the name became ideel, dropping the final 'i'.

== Business model and competitive landscape ==
Ideel operated a flash sale business model characterized by invitation-only membership, time-limited sales events, and a focus on delivering designer fashion at significant discounts. Registered users gained access to daily and weekly sale events that typically began at set times, with merchandise available until either the event’s end or until stocks sold out, often within hours. To create a sense of urgency and exclusivity, Ideel relied on aggressive digital marketing through email, mobile push notifications, and social media, encouraging members to visit frequently and act quickly in order to secure limited inventory.

This model positioned Ideel alongside peers such as Gilt Groupe, HauteLook, Rue La La, and Beyond the Rack in the competitive flash-sale landscape. Each of these platforms implemented curated selections of fashion, home, and beauty products, leveraging steep discounts and member-driven access to attract price-sensitive yet brand-conscious consumers. Ideel’s core differentiation was in its event-based site structure, prominent countdown timers, and frequent use of surprise giveaways.

Initially, the flash sale model benefited from a surplus of designer inventory following the late-2000s recession, offering brands a discreet outlet to clear excess stock without resorting to traditional retail markdowns. However, as the sector matured, several challenges emerged. The supply of high-quality surplus inventory decreased, and mainstream retailers intensified their own discounting efforts, eroding the exclusivity and value proposition of flash events. In this environment, Ideel—and its competitors—faced increased customer expectations for faster shipping and better service, while also contending with operational complexities, high customer acquisition costs, and diminishing margins.

By the mid-2010s, the flash sale sector had largely moved away from its original promise of regular, exclusive, and deeply discounted designer deals, with many former competitors either acquired, repurposed, or closed. Ideel would follow suit in 2014, being acquired by Groupon.
