= Where I've Been =

Social networking application

- Company type: Private
- Available in: English
- Dissolved: December 2013
- Headquarters: Chicago, Illinois, United States
- Founders: Craig Ulliott, Michael Dalesandro
- Parent: TripAdvisor
- Website: www.whereivebeen.com
- Launched: July 2008
- Current status: Inactive

Where I've Been was a social networking application that marked its users' travel history on a color-coded map. The site collected user-generated content such as photos, videos and reviews.

== History ==
The Where I've Been map was created as a Facebook application by freelance developer Craig Ulliott in 2007. By June of that year his map had over 400,000 users. In August, it was rumored that the application had been purchased by travel review site TripAdvisor for $3 million, which proved untrue. The application expanded to MySpace that September.

In April 2009, operating with more than 800,000 active monthly users, Where I've Been re-launched with a live site, new functionality focusing on local search, user-generated content, social networking and travel booking, as well as a new map using the Flash platform.

In July 2011, TripAdvisor announced its acquisition of Where I've Been for an undisclosed sum.

In December 2013, the website announced it was closed and redirected users to TripAdvisor.
