= Bigteams =

American athletic website developer

BigTeams, LLC
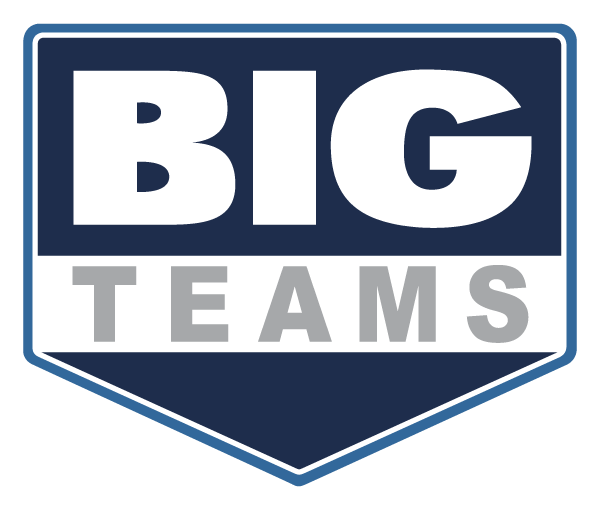
- BigTeams logo - updated 2010
- Industry: High School Sports Entertainment
- Founded: March 2002
- Founders: Matt Carson, Steve Sutherland, Jeff Gilbert
- Headquarters: Ashburn, Virginia, United States
- Website: bigteams.com

BigTeams develops athletic websites for high schools in both the United States and Canada. These websites allow coaches and athletic directors to update sports related content for the public such as rosters, news, photos, and schedules. Each BigTeams website is branded for the particular school including their color schemes and mascots. These websites also allow the schools to generate income through advertising sales. BigTeams has developed these websites for some of the nations most well known high schools including T. C. Williams High School. Since its inception most of BigTeams competitors have gone out of business including Online Athletics Interactive while those remaining have been purchased by larger corporations such as the Schedule Star sale to Gannett Company. BigTeams on the other hand remains privately held and has reduced its pricing to $50 per month.

BigTeams was awarded the contract to provide every high school in the state of New Hampshire an athletic website by the NHIAA (New Hampshire Interscholastic Athletic Association), making it the only state in the country with a statewide high school athletic system.

Early in its development BigTeams received an endorsement from former West Virginia University head football coach Don Nehlen saying, "I wish I had had one of these back when I was coaching high school football." In 2025, BigTeams was acquired by Arbiter, a provider of K–12 athletics and activities management software.
