= Quad Learning, Inc. =

American education service provider

- Type: Private
- Founded: 2012; 14 years ago
- Fate: Acquired by Wellspring International (2018)
- Headquarters: Washington, DC, United States
- Number of locations: Washington, Vietnam, China, Taiwan, Hong Kong
- Services: Education technology focused on international enrollment management services
- Number of employees: 30
- Parent: Wellspring International
- Website: www.quadlearninginc.com

Quad Learning, Inc. is an education service provider that delivers international enrollment management services to its client institutions, which include leading 2-year community colleges in addition to universities. Quad Learning collaborates with leading 2-year community colleges to provide enhanced student transfer success through the American Success and American Honors programs. Quad Learning was founded in 2012. The company provides collaborating institutions with a suite of international recruiting, educational development and delivery services focused on creating successful student outcomes.

In February 2013, Quad Learning launched with $11 million in funding. In April 2014, Quad Learning raised $10 million Series B funding from new and existing investors.

In November 2018, Quad Learning was acquired for an undisclosed amount by Wellspring International, an Illinois-based company that recruits students from 35 countries to study at American colleges.

== Business model ==
Quad Learning provides collaborating institutions with international enrollment management services including student recruitment services, in-market representation, admissions support, student services, transfer network coordination, and infrastructural support and capital. Students pay additional tuition and fees for differential support services received.

== Collaborating institutions ==
Institutions partnered with Quad Learning include:

- University of Arizona, Arizona
- Community Colleges of Spokane, Washington
- Community College of Philadelphia, Pennsylvania
- Union County College, New Jersey
- Kilgore College, Texas
- Jackson College, Michigan
- Pierce College, Washington
- Mercer County Community College, New Jersey
- Ivy Tech Community College, Indiana

== Transfer network ==
Universities and colleges actively recruit American Success and American Honors program graduates for transfer through the transfer network developed by the company. Through Quad Learning, member institutions develop and implement transfer agreements that may include conditional admission for program graduates meeting certain criteria, priority application review, good-faith articulation agreements, honors-honors transfer pathways, or other distinct considerations.
