= Tempus AI =

American health technology company

Tempus AI, Inc.
- Formerly: Tempus Labs, Inc.
- Type: Public
- Traded as: Nasdaq: TEM; Russell 1000 component
- Industry: Health technology
- Founded: 2015; 11 years ago
- Founder: Eric Lefkofsky
- Headquarters: Chicago, Illinois, U.S.
- Key people: Eric Lefkofsky (CEO)
- Revenue: ▲US$1.27 billion (2025)
- Net income: ▲US$–245 million (2025)
- Number of employees: 2,300 (2024)
- Website: tempus.com

Tempus AI, Inc. (formerly Tempus Labs) is an American health technology company founded in 2015 by Eric Lefkofsky in Chicago, Illinois. It was established by Lefkofsky soon after his wife was diagnosed with breast cancer. Tempus uses data and artificial intelligence (AI) to create precision medicine services, including diagnostics, for oncology, cardiology, radiology, and depression. The company went public on the Nasdaq on June 14, 2024, under the ticker symbol "TEM."

== Business ==
Tempus does genome sequencing and precision medicine, including diagnostics, primarily for cancer patients, as well as for cardiology patients, radiology, and pharmacogenomic testing for patients with depression. It is headquartered in Chicago.

Tempus investors include SoftBank Group, Baillie Gifford, New Enterprise Associates, Novo Holdings, Franklin Templeton Investments, T. Rowe Price, Revolution LLC, Google LLC, and others.

In June 2024, Tempus and SoftBank formed an AI healthcare joint venture in Japan called SB Tempus with a plan to develop personalized treatment recommendations by analyzing medical data with AI. In November that year, Tempus agreed to acquire California-based genetic testing company Ambry Genetics for $600 million in a cash-and-stock deal.

In July 2026, Tempus agreed to acquire cancer-testing company Personalis in a deal valued at approximately US$1.5 billion. The acquisition would add Personalis's NeXT Personal cancer test to Tempus's oncology portfolio and is expected to close in late 2026 or early 2027.

The company's advisory board includes Jennifer Doudna and Scott Gottlieb. At the end of 2025, Tempus employs around 3,800 people.
