= Savored =

Digital marketing provider

- Website type: Restaurant reservations
- Owner: Groupon
- Website: www.savored.com
- Registration: Required for reservations
- Launched: 2009

Savored (formerly VillageVines) is a provider of digital marketing for premier restaurants; the service was founded by Benjamin McKean and Daniel Leahy in New York City in 2009. The service acts as a marketing tool for high-end restaurants used to seat tables that would otherwise go unseated, while consumers receive a discount at these restaurant. The goal of the business is to provide a variable pricing model for restaurants to match demand with supply, similar to the method used in other hospitality markets.

== Service for Members ==
When launched, Savored (then VillageVines) allowed registered members to search for available reservations based on party size, time, date, neighborhood and cuisine. Reservations were $10 per booking, and in return members received a 30% discount on their meal. If the total bill was less than $33.33 (meaning the total discount amount works out to less than $10), a member could request a refund on the $10 booking fee.

On May 9, 2012, Savored announced a new model. Discounts are dynamic and vary with consumer demand for different timeslots. For example, a given restaurant may have more available tables at 5-6 PM, and therefore offer a 40% discount, whereas the 8-9 PM timeslot receives a 10% discount.

== Service for Restaurants ==
Savored offers to its restaurant customers a yield management tool which allows them to fill tables on days and at times that the tables would otherwise go unseated. Reservations are made both manually and also through a proprietary electronic reservation book. Savored also allows restaurants access to its Signatures platform to market special events and menus.

== History ==
In 2009, McKean and Leahy left their jobs on Wall Street to start VillageVines, originally positioned as a web site that would offer discounts at restaurants for a limited time period. The service began with a select number of restaurants in New York and service expanded to Washington, D.C., San Francisco, Los Angeles and Chicago in September 2010. That model gave way to the existing model, which features $10 reservations for members, at a discount of 30% off the total dining bill.

In January 2010, VillageVines raised $3 Million in its first round of funding from Hearst Interactive Media, GrandBanks Capital and High Peaks Venture Partners. VillageVines announced in June 2011 that it would be renamed Savored and continued its expansion to include another five markets, rolling out service in Boston, Philadelphia, Atlanta, Miami and Denver. National partnerships with OpenTable and Zagat were also publicized at this time. In October 2011 Savored Signatures, which features unique one-off experiences, was introduced by Savored partners and other industry names.

On September 24, 2012, Savored was acquired by Groupon for an undisclosed amount. At the time, Savored had partnerships with about 1000 restaurants in 10 cities.

== Markets ==
Savored is currently available in ten markets within the United States: New York, Boston, Philadelphia, Washington, D.C., Atlanta, Miami, Chicago, San Francisco, Los Angeles and Denver.
