= Revolution LLC =

American investment firm

- Industry: Venture capital
- Founded: 2005
- Founder: Steve Case; Donn Davis; Tige Savage
- Headquarters: Washington, D.C., U.S.
- Key people: Chairman and CEO: Steve Case
- Website: www.revolution.com

Revolution LLC is an American investment firm based in Washington, D.C., founded in 2005 by AOL co-founder Steve Case, after leaving the AOL Time Warner board. The firm seeks to fund entrepreneurs who are transforming legacy industries with innovative products and services, with an overarching focus on companies that are based outside of the coastal tech hubs of New York City, San Francisco, and Boston. Through the firm's Rise of the Rest platform, it has developed a network of business and civic relationships that helps Revolution source investments and support existing companies as they seek to expand across the country. Notable investments include LivingSocial, Zipcar, DraftKings, and sweetgreen.

== Foundation ==
Revolution LLC was founded in 2005 by Steve Case, a well-known entrepreneur and a co-founder of America Online (AOL), the first Internet company in the world to go public along with Donn Davis and Tige Savage. After negotiating the merger of AOL and Time Warner, a transaction that today remains the largest merger in business history, AOL Time Warner floundered and Case resigned from his post in January 2003, with the merger often cited as one of the worst mergers ever. After leaving the AOL Time Warner board in 2005, Case co-founded venture capital firm, Revolution LLC, where he is the chairman and CEO.

== Investment funds ==
Revolution operates three major investment funds with different focuses.

Revolution Ventures focuses on early-stage technology investments under $10 million. Revolution later announced their "Rise of the Rest" seed fund that included major investors from across multiple industries including Jeff Bezos and the Walton family.

Revolution Growth makes growth-stage investments of $10 million and above, primarily in consumer technology businesses. It was created in 2011 with $450 million of initial capital. It typically invests in two to three new companies per year, mostly on the East Coast of the United States. Its major investments have included Sweetgreen, Bigcommerce, Optoro, Handybook, and PolicyGenius.

Revolution Places makes real estate and hospitality investments, usually between $25 and $50 million. It is usually the majority shareholder in each portfolio company.

Profile investments in the collective Revolution portfolio include Zipcar, LivingSocial, Lolly Wolly Doodle, Waterfront Media, FedBid, Exclusive Resorts, Inspirato, Miraval, SparkPeople, Extend Health, BrainScope, AddThis, BenchPrep, Framebridge, SpareFoot, OrderUp, and Custom Ink.
