= Lightbank =

American venture capital investments firm

- Type: Financial organization/venture fund
- Industry: Finance venture funding
- Founded: 2010; 16 years ago
- Founders: Eric Lefkofsky; Brad Keywell
- Headquarters: Chicago, Illinois, United States
- Key people: Eric Lefkofsky; Brad Keywell; Paul Lee
- Website: lightbank.com

Lightbank is a Chicago-based venture capital firm founded in 2010 by Eric Lefkofsky and Brad Keywell.

== History ==
The company was founded in 2010 by Groupon co-founders Brad Keywell and Eric Lefkofsky. Lefkofsky was a special advisor of Lightbank in 2014 and 2015, then became managing partner in November 2015. Other partners include Eric Ong, Matt Sacks, and Bill Pescatello.

In 2011, Lightbank had raised over $700 million and had a $290 million Fund III. Its investments included Groupon, Tempus AI, Fiverr and Udemy. By 2013, other investments included Sprout Social and Belly. It invested in Boom Technology in 2017, SpotHero in 2014, and BenchPrep and Qwiki by 2021 among others.
