= Mediaocean =

Advertising services and software company

Mediaocean LLC
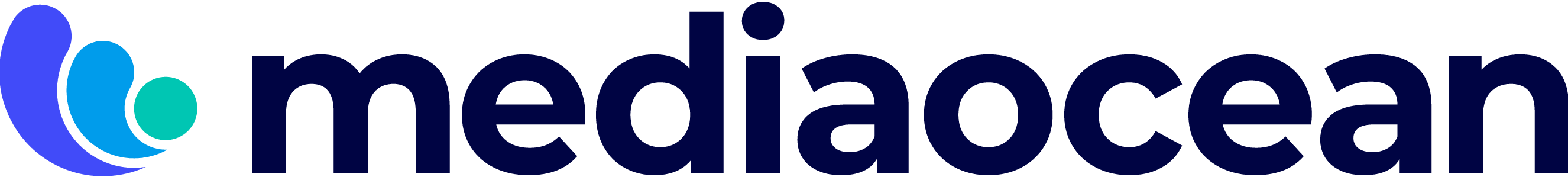
- Type: Private company
- Industry: Advertising, information technology
- Predecessors: MediaBank, Donovan Data Systems
- Founded: March 2012
- Headquarters: New York City, United States of America
- Key people: Bill Wise (co-founder & CEO)
- Revenue: $400 million
- Number of employees: 1200 (2021)
- Website: mediaocean.com

Mediaocean LLC is a media and software advertising services company headquartered in New York City. The company has offices located in London, Chicago, Tel Aviv, Pune and Sydney. As of 2020, the company employed 1200 people.

== History ==
Mediaocean was founded in 2012 through the merger of advertising technology companies Donovan Data Systems and MediaBank, which the companies announced the year before.

Vista Equity Partners acquired a majority stake in Mediaocean in 2015. In May of that same year, Mediaocean acquired TView, a television planning system from Stone House Systems, Inc. in Chicago, and in May 2016, Mediaocean acquired ColSpace, a provider of cloud-based, collaborative media-planning software.

In September 2017, Mediaocean announced its partnership with 4C to improve cross-channel marketing. In 2018, Vista Equity Partner explored a sale of Mediaocean. In 2019, Mediaocean added the SpotX platform to its system and signed a contract with WideOrbit, a TV programmatic company. In January 2020, Mediaocean acquired Paris-based media management software provider MBS. Later that year, Mediaocean announced the acquisition of Chicago-based data science and media technology company 4C Insights.

In July 2021, Mediaocean announced the acquisition of advertising server company Flashtalking. The following month, Mediaocean announced that the stake in its company held by Vista Equity Partners was being acquired by CVC Capital Partners, along with TA Associates.

== Corporate affairs ==
=== Leadership ===
Mediaocean is managed by CEO Bill Wise as of 2020. Other executives are:

- Nick Galassi, co-founder & CFO
- John Nardone, President
