= Framebridge =

American framing manufacturer

- Company type: Subsidiary
- Industry: Custom Framing
- Founded: 2014
- Founder: Susan Tynan
- Headquarters: Washington, DC
- Area served: United States
- Number of employees: 200 (2017)
- Website: framebridge.com

Framebridge is a direct-to-consumer startup company in the custom framing industry. The company allows customers to upload photography or mail in art to be framed, and, beginning in 2019, began operating physical locations.

== History ==
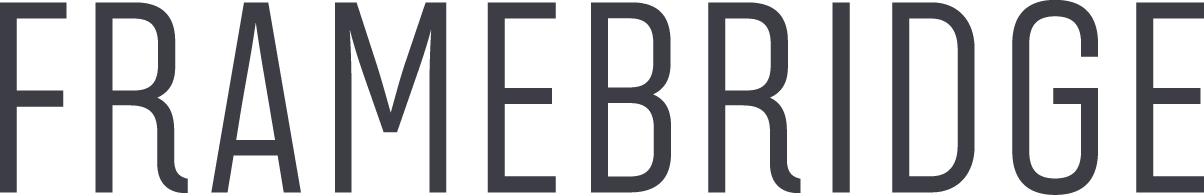
Previous logo version

The company was founded in 2014 by Susan Tynan, who is the CEO. Framebridge has raised more than $81 million in venture funding — the most ever raised by any woman-founded company in the D.C. area. The company is headquartered in Washington, DC and operates a manufacturing facility in Richmond, Kentucky.

In 2017, the company announced a partnership with Target. In November 2017, Nate Berkus joined Framebridge as Creative Advisor.

In March 2019, Framebridge announced the launch of two new retail stores in the DC area, one in downtown and one in Bethesda. As of January 2022, the company was operating 15 brick and mortar stores with plans to open 30 by the end of the year.

In May 2020, Framebridge was acquired by Graham Holdings.
