= Groupon =

American worldwide e-commerce marketplace

Groupon, Inc.
- Company type: Public
- Website type: Online deal marketplace
- Traded as: Nasdaq: GRPN; Russell 2000 component
- Headquarters: Leo Burnett Building, Chicago, Illinois, U.S.
- Area served: Global
- Founders: Andrew Mason; Eric Lefkofsky; Brad Keywell
- Chairperson: Ted Leonsis
- CEO: Dušan Šenkypl
- Industry: Electronic commerce
- Revenue: ▼US$515 million (2023)
- Operating income: ▲US$−18 million (2023)
- Net income: ▲US$−55 million (2023)
- Total assets: ▼US$571 million (2023)
- Total equity: ▼US$−41 million (2023)
- Employees: 2,213 (2023)
- Subsidiaries: Groupon MyCityDeal, Ideel, LivingSocial, CommerceInterface, Adku, SnapSave, Swarm, Mob.ly, PrettyQuick LLC, Groupon Getaways, Aisle50, GrouponLive, Plumfare, Boomerang, Inc., Cloud Savings Company
- Website: groupon.com
- Launched: November 2008; 18 years ago
- Current status: Active
- Native clients on: iOS, Android

Groupon, Inc. is an American e-commerce marketplace that connects subscribers with local merchants by offering activities, travel, goods, and services in 13 countries.

The company launched in Chicago in November 2008 before expanding to Boston, New York City, and Toronto. As of October 2010, Groupon was available in 150 cities in North America and 100 cities across Europe, Asia, and South America, with 35 million registered users. By March 2015, Groupon served approximately 500 cities and 48.1 million registered users.

As of 2024, Groupon operates with a leaner workforce and has shifted focus to digital vouchers and services after discontinuing much of its physical goods segment.

Groupon was created by former CEO and Pittsburgh native Andrew Mason. The idea gained the attention of his former employer, Eric Lefkofsky, who provided $1 million in seed money to develop the idea. In April 2010, the company was valued at $1.35 billion. According to a December 2010 report conducted by Groupon's marketing association and reported in Forbes magazine and the Wall Street Journal, Groupon was "projecting that the company is on pace to make $1 billion in sales faster than any other business, ever."

In its first earnings release as a public company, Groupon reported a 2011 fourth-quarter loss of $9.8 million on an adjusted basis, disappointing investors. Additional investor concerns arose after the company restated 2011 revenues downward in March 2012.

== History ==
The idea that would eventually become Groupon was born out of founder Andrew Mason's frustration trying to cancel a mobile phone contract in 2006. Mason thought that there must be some way to leverage the collective bargaining power of a large number of people. In 2007 Mason launched The Point, a web platform based on the "tipping point" principle that would use social media to get people together to accomplish a goal. The Point was intended to organize people around some sort of cause or goal. It gained only modest traction in Chicago until a group of users decided their cause would be saving money. They wanted to round up people to buy the same product in order to receive a group discount. Founder Eric Lefkofsky wanted the company to pivot in order to focus entirely on group buying. Born from The Point, Groupon was launched in November 2008.

The name for the e-commerce platform, Groupon is a portmanteau of "group" and "coupon". Groupon's first deal was a two-pizzas-for-the-price-of-one offer at Motel Bar, a restaurant on the first floor of its building in Chicago.

The decision to focus on group buying proved wise. In just a year and a half, Groupon grew from a staff of a few dozen to over 350. Revenue and bookings also grew swiftly, and the company was valued at over $1 billion after just 16 months in business, the fastest company ever to reach this milestone.

=== Initial public offering ===
On June 2, 2011, Groupon filed to go public under the ticker symbol GRPN. The company went public on November 4, 2011, with its shares listed on Nasdaq. It was the biggest IPO by an Internet company since Google in 2004. The IPO was handled by Morgan Stanley, Goldman Sachs Group and Credit Suisse Group.

On August 10, 2011, Groupon updated its IPO filing, after facing scrutiny from regulators and analysts over its use of a non-standard accounting metric called Adjusted Consolidated Segment Operating Income. Critics argued that ACSOI was used by Groupon to present a misleading metric of profitability. Groupon's original IPO filing with ACSOI accounting showed a positive operating income of $60.6 million for 2010; after replacing the ACSOI metric with standard accounting metrics, Groupon's IPO filing reported an operating loss of $420 million for 2010. Prior to the IPO, some analysts criticized Groupon's decision to pay out over $940 million of the $1.12 billion in venture capital Groupon had raised before the IPO – over 84% of its venture capital raised – as cash payouts to its 3 founders and early backers, rather than into the company. The large cash payout also made Groupon technically insolvent when it filed for its IPO.

In 2012, it was noted that Groupon had lost 80% of its value since its initial public offering the previous year. The stock had since rebounded and was trading around $8 in Q1 2015 before plunging as low as $2.15 in early 2016.

=== 2011 onward ===
Prior to the company's fifth anniversary, the Groupon website was completely redesigned and new features were added in November 2013. According to the SVP of product management, the original website was "designed for a deal of the day and the new site is designed for a marketplace." Following the website relaunch, the company rewarded a random selection of one million customers on November 20, 2013, with up to US$5,000 worth of "Groupon bucks".

Groupon recorded record-breaking holiday weekend sales in North America during the full (Black Friday through Cyber Monday) weekend of 2014 (Nov 28 – Dec. 21), representing the most successful four days ever in the company's six-year history, with sales up more than 25% year over year. Black Friday and Cyber Monday were the two biggest days in Groupon's North American history.

Following Amazon.com's December announcement on drone delivery, Groupon reacted with a plan for "Groupon catapults".

On December 29, 2014, Groupon's shares rose by 1.4% after it was reported that Goldman Sachs was "weighing an investment in one of the daily deal company’s units."

Groupon named a new Chief Operating Officer on June 2, 2015, Rich Williams and in November, Williams was named CEO.

On September 22, 2015, Groupon announced they would be eliminating approximately 1,100 positions, primarily in their sales and customer service operations. As part of this restructure, they would also be ceasing operations in international markets such as Morocco, Panama, Philippines, Puerto Rico, Taiwan, Thailand and Uruguay. Exiting those markets was part of a strategy to boost profits.

In January 2016, Groupon signed a lease in Seattle for 42,000 square feet of space in the 1201 3rd Avenue building in downtown. This creates room for 400 employees, up from 300 that Groupon currently employs in Washington.

In May 2016, Groupon sued IBM, claiming that IBM had infringed the patent of technology that allows solicitation of customers based on where the customers are located. Groupon filed the lawsuit shortly after IBM accused Groupon of infringement in a previous lawsuit. In October 2018 the separate lawsuit was settled, with Groupon paying IBM $57 million to cover the infringement and licensing of four patents.

In November 2016, Groupon began to reduce its area of coverage from 27 countries down to 15. It shut down operations in South Africa on November 4 of that year.

In March 2020, both Groupon's CEO Rich Williams and Chief Operating Officer Steve Krenzer stepped down from their roles. Despite that, both of them still remain employed by the company, "The terms of Mr. Williams’ and Mr. Krenzer's separations will be disclosed as available and required". Interim CEO Aaron Cooper was replaced by Kedar Deshpande. Dušan Šenkypl became the company's new CEO in March 2023.

In June 2022, Groupon settled a class action lawsuit with a group of investors for $13.5 million. The agreement resolved claims that Groupon has misled investors.

In December 2022, two beauty salons, Salon Phoenix Cosmetology in Hoboken, New Jersey and Salon Hairroin in Los Angeles, filed a class action lawsuit against Groupon, arguing that company listed them on their website without their permission, thus tarnishing their reputations and stealing organic search traffic from them. In November 2023, an Illinois federal judge approved a settlement (preliminarily approved in August 2023) between the two companies and Groupon. That settlement benefitted more than 2.5 million small businesses. All class members were also able to ask Groupon to remove or edit company profiles and expired deal pages.

=== Acquisitions and partnerships ===
Groupon owns numerous international operations, all of which were originally deal-of-the-day services similar to it, but most of which was subsequently re-branded under the Groupon name after the acquisition, including the European-based MyCityDeal (May 17, 2010), the South American ClanDescuento (June 22, 2010), the Japanese service Qpod.jp and Russian Darberry.ru (both acquired on August 17, 2010), and the Singaporean Beeconomic.com (November 30, 2010), which was founded by brothers Karl Chong and Christopher Chong.

Groupon bought the Indian deal-of-the-day website SoSasta.com in January 2011 and re-branded it as "Crazeal by Groupon Inc." The Groupon acquisitions of uBuyiBuy launched services under the Groupon name in Hong Kong. In addition, Groupon acquired GroupsMore.com to expand its business in Malaysia.

Prior to these acquisitions, Groupon had bought out the mobile technology company Mob.ly, while The Point, Inc., the predecessor to Groupon, bought the trademark

On August 4, 2011, the company acquired Obtiva, a large Chicago, Illinois-based Ruby on Rails and Agile Software Development consulting firm for an undisclosed amount, in order to boost its technology recruiting capabilities.

In January 2012, the company acquired Mertado, a social shopping service based on the Facebook platform. In May 2012, Groupon acquired Breadcrumb, a point of sale system and iPad app that targets local restaurants. Based on the May acquisition, Groupon launched Breadcrumb PRO and Breadcrumb POS, expanding its target beyond restaurants to include all types of local businesses.

On September 24, 2012, Groupon acquired restaurant reservation and discount site Savored for an undisclosed amount, providing Groupon with an inlet to higher-end restaurants. Groupon also announced that it would continue to operate Savored independently from the main Groupon website.

In December 2013, Groupon acquired Boomerang, a Lightbank-backed start-up that allows people to share gift cards and other deals from local merchants with their friends. Boomerang's two cofounders, Zachary Smith and Matthew Williams, along with eight employees went on to build a new digital-coupon offering, called Groupon Coupons.

On January 11, 2013, Groupon acquired real-time location sharing mobile app and small business service provider Glassman, which was founded and led by Geoffrey Woo, Jon Zhang and Jonathan Chang. On September 9, 2013, Groupon announced acquisition of European last-minute travel app Blink (founded by Rebeca Minguela), which provides same-day hotel reservations.

In January 2014, Groupon bought ideeli, a fashion company, for $43 million. On October 2, 2014, Groupon unveiled Snap, a new app specifically for giving customers cash back when they buy certain items at the grocery store. Snap asks shoppers to upload photos of their receipts after they have gone to the supermarket to buy groceries. Certain items are then eligible for discounts, which shoppers receive in the form of a cash-back deal. The new app comes from Groupon's previous acquisition of SnapSaves, a Canadian start-up that works much like Snap. In November 2014, Groupon acquired In-Store Analytics And Marketing Start-up, Swarm Mobile, a start-up that helps businesses connect with and track their customers while in stores.

On July 16, 2015, Groupon announced its acquisition of food-delivery service Order Up. Two weeks later, Groupon announced its own Food Delivery Business, Groupon To Go.

In February 2016, Chinese online retailer Alibaba Group Holding Ltd disclosed that it had acquired a 5.6% stake in Groupon Inc. In April 2016, Groupon Inc. announced it received a $250 million investment from a private investment firm, Atairos Management LP, which has ties to Comcast Corp. The firm was founded by former Comcast Chief Financial Officer Michael Angelakis, who launched the firm earlier that year with more than $4 billion in committed capital from Comcast.

In May 2018, Groupon acquired Bristol, UK-based Cloud Savings company for $65 million.

== Business ==
=== Business model ===
When it first launched, the company offered one "Groupon" per day in each of the markets it served. The Groupon worked as an assurance contract using The Point's platform: if a certain number of people signed up for the offer, then the deal became available to all; if the predetermined minimum was not met, no one got the deal that day. This reduced risk for retailers, who can treat the coupons as quantity discounts as well as sales promotion tools. In the early years before revenue splits began to adjust as necessary, Groupon made money by keeping approximately half the money the customer pays for the coupon. More recently that split could vary depending on many factors.

Unlike classified advertising, the merchants advertising on Groupon do not pay any upfront cost to participate: Consumers are able to search and browse deals via web or mobile and can subscribe to receive emails featuring deals they are interested in based on preferences they input. Groupon employs copywriters who draft descriptions for the deals featured by email and on the website. Groupon's promotional text strategy in the early years for the deals has been seen as a contributing factor to the popularity of the site, featuring a distinctive mix of thorough fact-checking and witty humor.

Some publications have noted potential problems with the business model. For example, the Wall Street Journal has reported that a successful deal could temporarily swamp a small business with too many customers, risking a possibility that customers will be dissatisfied, or that there won't be enough product to meet the demand. In response to these issues, Groupon officials have stated that deals sold will be capped in advance to a number that the business can service effectively.

In 2015, it was reported that 88% of merchants agree that their Groupon deal brought in new customers, and 82% of customers say they are likely to return to the merchant again. One analysis found only ~20% of Groupon buyers returned for full-price purchases.

In 2010, it was reported that local merchants found it difficult to get Groupon interested in agreeing to a particular deal. According to the Wall Street Journal, seven of every eight possible deals suggested by merchants were dismissed by Groupon.

Groupon offers a mobile application which allows users to browse, buy deals, and redeem them using the screen as a coupon.

In addition to daily local deals, Groupon's channels have included: Groupon Goods, launched in September 2011, which focuses on discounted merchandise, although Groupon officially announced the closure of goods on February 19, 2020, but then decided almost three months later to phase down the Goods business and cut 44% of its employees; Groupon Getaways, which offers vacation packages and travel deals; and GrouponLive, where consumers can find discounts on ticketed events Groupon has also emerged as a check on price increases for certain essential commodities in many countries.

In recent years, Groupon has shifted greater focus toward higher-margin local experiences and services, phasing out lower-margin goods. As of 2025, Groupon's Local segment in North America was the primary growth driver.

=== Geographic markets ===
Groupon has served markets in several countries including, the United States, Canada, Ukraine, Germany, Greece, France, the Netherlands, Belgium, the United Kingdom, India, Indonesia, Ireland, Israel, Denmark, Thailand, United Arab Emirates, New Zealand and others. In 2010, Forbes noted that there were over 700 Groupon copycat sites, the majority of them existing overseas.

On February 19, 2011 The Wall Street Journal reported that Groupon was preparing to launch in China. Groupon subsequently entered into the China market in a joint venture with Tencent and launched "Gaopeng" (高朋; 'good friend'). After a year of struggling in the established market, Goapeng subsequently merged with Futuan. Groupon also launched in the MENA region with Groupon UAE on June 16, 2011.

Groupon entered the Indian market through the acquisition of local company SoSasta in Jan 2011. Finally, after winning a battle to acquire the groupon.co.in domain name, the Indian business was renamed Groupon in Nov 2012. In August 2015, Groupon gave up control of its India unit to Sequoia Capital and renamed the company Nearbuy. In February 2011, Groupon Russia announced it would join the Russian Company Mail.ru in order to start offering deals on its social network Odnoklassniki. This way, users would be able to buy and share deals from Groupon on their profiles.

=== Financials ===
New Enterprise Associates, Eric Lefkofsky and Brad Keywell are investors in Groupon (Lefkofsky and Keywell later formed the investment company Lightbank; Groupon is listed as a Lightbank investment). In April 2010, Groupon raised $135 million from Digital Sky Technologies, a Russian investment firm. On December 29, 2010, Groupon's executive board approved a change to Groupon's certificate of incorporation that would permit the company to raise $950 million in venture capital funding, based on a valuation of $6.4 billion.

From January 2010 through January 2011, Groupon's U.S. monthly revenues grew from $11 million to $89 million. Consolidated revenue for the full year 2014 reached nearly $3.2 billion.

In October 2010, Yahoo! was rumoured to have offered over $3 billion to acquire Groupon. On November 30, 2010, it was reported that Google offered $5.3 billion with a $700 million earnout to acquire Groupon and was rejected on December 3, 2010. After the rejection of the Google/Groupon buy-out, Groupon proceeded with their own initial public offering.

Groupon's consolidated gross billings for the full year 2014 increased 32% year-over-year to $7.6 billion.

=== Groupon Now application ===
In 2011, Groupon developed an application, Groupon Now, aimed at smartphone and tablet users. The application consists of two buttons: "I'm Hungry" and "I'm Bored." Once a user clicks on one of the buttons, the app then locates the closest and best deals for food or entertainment, respectively, using geolocation.

=== Groupon Promise ===
Groupon have the Groupon Promise to ensure that customers are satisfied with their purchase and if customers are disappointed with their purchase, Groupon will try to work things out with the customers or give them a refund. The Groupon Promise is essential in dissipating cognitive dissonance and perceived risk.

=== Groupon VIP ===
On February 20, 2012, Groupon announced a "VIP Membership" program, with a membership fee of $30 annually. This program gives VIP members access to deals 12 hours earlier than non-members, as well as access to expired deals (in the "Deal Vault") and easy returns of deals (in exchange for "Groupon bucks").

=== Groupon MerchantOS ===
Groupon MerchantOS is a suite of products and tools for merchants running with Groupon. The suite includes Groupon Rewards, Groupon Scheduler and Groupon Payments.

=== Groupon Rewards ===
On May 10, 2012, Groupon announced the launch of Groupon Rewards in the United States. Rewards is a loyalty program for merchants to reward customers for repeat visits with a Reward of their choosing. Unlike "buy 9 and get the 10th free" punchcards, a consumer earns Rewards by using any major credit card saved in their Groupon account when they visit their favourite local merchants. When a customer spends an amount pre-determined by the merchant, the customer unlocks a Reward to use on a future visit. The rewards program was later removed due to lack of engineering support.

=== Groupon Scheduler ===
Groupon Scheduler is an online booking tool for merchants, allowing their consumers to seamlessly book appointments for services at the time of purchasing their Groupon deal. This tool is targeted at merchants running deals where appointments are required, for example in the health and beauty industry or for classes and activities.

=== Groupon Payments ===
The newest addition to the suite of merchant-facing products is Groupon Payments, which was launched in September 2012. Groupon Payments offers merchants an infrastructure for accepting credit card payments at a low cost.

As of December 2015, MerchantOS is no longer a Groupon division.

== Reception ==
=== Super Bowl commercials ===
Groupon aired a controversial Super Bowl XLV advertisement in which actor Timothy Hutton begins by making a plea for the people of Tibet before delivering the punch line: "But they still whip up an amazing fish curry." Critics of the ad took to several social media outlets to argue that Groupon was using the plight of Tibetans to sell their services. The commercial angered consumers who described the ad with adjectives including "tasteless," "tacky," "vulgar" and "detestable". The following day, Groupon responded by defending their commercial and their philanthropic stance. On February 10, 2011, Groupon's founder Andrew Mason apologized and pulled the ad.

The company waited seven years before it would try another Super Bowl ad. The commercial that aired during Super Bowl LII featured Tiffany Haddish, a comedian and active Groupon user.

=== Violation of gift certificate expiration laws ===
In March 2011, Eli R. Johnson filed a lawsuit in federal court against Groupon, based on a claim that the company issues "gift certificates" that are not allowed under the Credit Card Accountability Responsibility and Disclosure Act. The act prohibits retailers from setting expiration dates less than 5 years after a card is purchased. The class action lawsuit was settled on December 17, 2012.

=== Massachusetts Alcoholic Beverages Control Commission ===
In March 2011, the Massachusetts Alcoholic Beverages Control Commission notified Groupon that it was in violation of state law that prohibits discounting of alcoholic beverages. Groupon notified Massachusetts subscribers of a temporary suspension in the use of its discount vouchers for alcohol at participating restaurants.

=== UK Office of Fair Trading investigation ===
During 2011 there were reported breaches of British advertising regulations to the Advertising Standards Authority. In December 2011 the Office of Fair Trading (OFT) launched an investigation into Groupon after the firm broke regulations 48 times in 11 months.

The OFT concluded in March 2012 that Groupon was in "widespread breaches" of UK consumer laws and were ordered to "clean up their practices" within three months including ensuring its website was accurate, realistic, claims related to any beauty or health products offered were substantiated and that refund and cancellation policies were in accordance with current regulations.

=== Groupon and Chilean consumer office lawsuit ===
The agency filed the lawsuit after a series of faults in the delivery and conditions of products and services sold to consumers.

In August 2016, the disagreements between the Chilean National Consumer Service (Sernac) and Groupon were evident. Both decided to raise a collective mediation for a series of questions that the entity dependent on the Ministry of Economy by groupon for the services of the virtual platform. In spite of the negotiations, the negotiations did not arrive at good port. And a few days after Christmas, Sernac filed a class action lawsuit against Groupon.

According to the agency, Groupon breached the conditions offered and contracted with consumers, in particular, due to non-compliance with deadlines offered and committed for the delivery of products or services. It even accuses it of not delivering the items purchased by consumers, with the consequent unilateral cancellation of purchases or having offered products and services without stock available.

This is compounded by the fact of dispatching articles of less value to the acquired or sending another product to the purchased, defaulting promotions and offers, "without respecting discount coupons offered and purchased by consumers," reads the lawsuit filed before the 18 ° Civil Court of Santiago.

According to information revealed by Sernac in the judicial action, during 2016 the service received numerous claims against Groupon. As of December 20, these totalled 1,958, which resulted in legal action. "The defendant incurs a serious violation of the Consumer Protection Law, violating the basic and irrevocable right, which is the right to truthful and timely information that assists every consumer," said the letter.

=== Living on Groupon ("Live Off Groupon" program) ===
In May 2010, Groupon created a challenge to live on Groupons for one year. The contestant Josh Stevens travelled throughout the United States and to the United Kingdom and purchased all food, drinks, travel, entertainment and more from Groupon for 365 days. At the end of the year, he received a prize of $100,000.

=== Media related ===
- Friend Me, a CBS sitcom based around Groupon, was created in 2012, but never aired.
