= Michael A. Banks =

American writer and editor (1951–2023)

- Born: March 21, 1951; Princeton, Indiana, U.S.
- Died: June 19, 2023 (aged 72)
- Occupations: Editor; novelist; short story author
- Writing career
- Period: 1976–2022
- Genres: Science fiction, Fantasy

Michael A. Banks (March 21, 1951 – June 19, 2023) was a writer and editor of science fiction and non-fiction.

== Biography ==
Banks was born in Princeton, Indiana on March 21, 1951. He wrote several biographies for magazines, including those about aviators, inventors, and other figures. His book, Crosley, is the story of inventor Powel Crosley, Jr., who founded radio station WLW and built the Crosley automobile, Moonbeam aircraft, and low-cost radios that touched off the broadcasting industry in 1921.

Banks died on June 19, 2023, at the age of 72.

== Career ==
=== Computing ===
A former columnist for Windows Magazine and Computer Shopper, Banks documented the growth of online services and the Internet and Web from the early 1980s onward. His book The Modem Reference was a guide to the online world during the 1980s and into the 1990s, selling more than 200,000 copies. Banks explored Internet crime and computer privacy with his books Web Psychos, Stalkers and Pranksters, and PC Confidential. He also served as a freelance acquisitions editor for Baen Books and associate editor for Baen's quarterly "book-a-zine", and New Destinies in the 1980s.

Banks also wrote On the Way to the Web: The Secret History of the Internet, which tells the story of what was happening online before the Web, including the histories of Videotex and online services such as CompuServe, The Source, PlayNET, AOL, Q-Link, Viewdata, and Prestel.

=== Science fiction ===
His nonfiction works in the science fiction field include Understanding Science Fiction and collaborations with Mack Reynolds.

Banks wrote several novels, including The Odysseus Solution with Dean R. Lambe, and has also been a contributor to Analog, Asimov's SF, and other publications.

=== Other work ===
Banks also wrote Before Oprah: Ruth Lyons, the Woman Who Created Talk TV.

== See also ==
- The Encyclopedia of Science Fiction, pages 88–89
