= Steve Case =

American businessman and former CEO of AOL

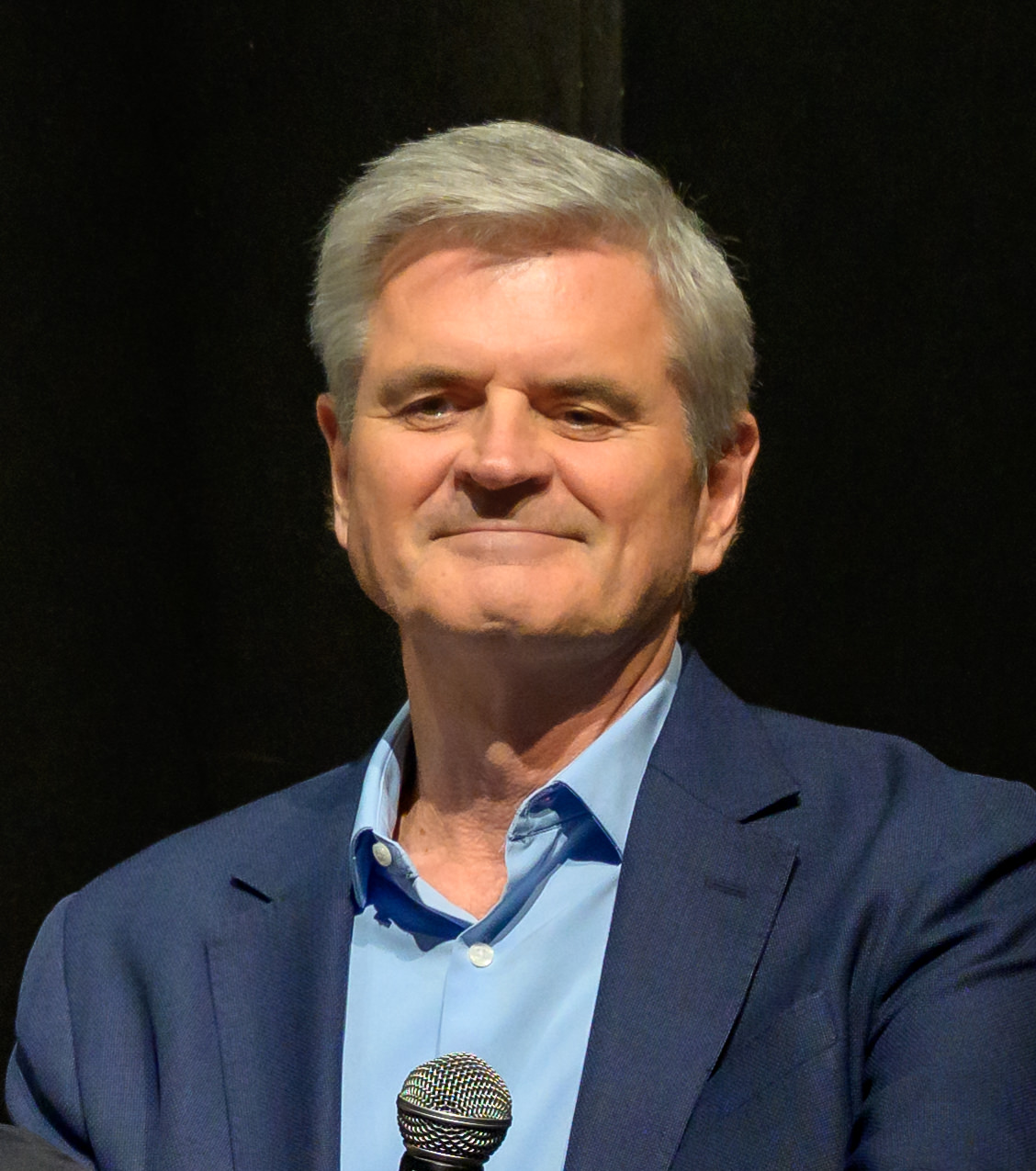
- Case in 2024
- Born: Stephen McConnell Case; August 21, 1958 (age 68); Honolulu, Hawaii Territory, U.S.
- Education: Williams College
- Political party: Independent
- Spouses: Joanne Barker (m. 1985; div. 1996) Jean Villanueva (m. 1998)
- Children: 5

Stephen McConnell Case (born August 21, 1958) is an American businessman, investor, and philanthropist best known as the former chief executive officer and chairman of America Online (AOL). Case joined AOL's predecessor company, Quantum Computer Services, as a marketing vice-president in 1985. In 1991, he became CEO of the company (renamed AOL). Later, at the height of the dot-com bubble in 2000, Case orchestrated with Gerald M. Levin the merger that created AOL Time Warner, described as "the biggest train wreck in the history of corporate America."

Since resigning as chairman of the company in 2003, he has launched a venture-capital firm, Revolution LLC, based in Washington, D.C., and authored The Third Wave: An Entrepreneur's Vision of the Future, which in 2016 became a New York Times bestselling book. In 2022, he published his second book, The Rise of the Rest: How Entrepreneurs in Surprising Places Are Building the New American Dream.

== Life and career ==
Steve Case was born and grew up in Honolulu, Hawaii, the son of Carol and Daniel Case. He graduated from the private Punahou School in 1976 and attended Central Union Church.

Case graduated from Williams College in Williamstown, Massachusetts in 1980 with a degree in political science. For the next two years he worked as an assistant brand manager at Procter & Gamble in Cincinnati, Ohio. In 1982 he joined Pizza Hut Inc. in Wichita, Kansas, as manager of new pizza marketing.

In January 1983, his older brother, Dan, an investment banker, introduced him to Bill von Meister, CEO of Control Video Corporation. The company was marketing a service called GameLine for the Atari 2600 video game console that allowed users to download games via a phone line and modem. After that meeting, von Meister hired Case as a marketing consultant. Later that year, the company nearly went bankrupt and one of its investors, Frank Caufield, brought in his friend Jim Kimsey as a manufacturing consultant. Case later joined the company as a full-time marketing employee.

In 1985, Quantum Computer Services, an online services company, was founded by Jim Kimsey from the remnants of Control Video. Kimsey became CEO of the newly renamed Quantum Computer Services and hired Case as vice president of marketing. In 1987, he promoted him again to executive vice president. Kimsey groomed Case to become chairman and CEO when Kimsey retired, and the transition formally took place in 1991 (CEO) and 1995 (chairman).

As part of the changes that gave birth to Quantum, Case changed the company's strategy, creating an online service called Quantum Link (Q-Link for short) for the Commodore 64 in 1985 with programmer (and AOL co-founder) Marc Seriff. In 1988, Quantum began offering the AppleLink online service for Apple and PC Link for IBM compatible computers. In 1991, he changed the company name to America Online and merged the Apple and PC services under the AOL name; the new service reached 1 million subscribers by 1994, and Q-Link was terminated October 21 of that year.

AOL pioneered the concept of social media for home users, as its focus from day one was on communication features such as chatrooms, instant messaging and forums. Case believed that the "killer app" was community — people interacting with each other — and that was the driver of much of AOL's early success. By contrast, competitive services of the time such as Prodigy funded by IBM and Sears, focused on shopping, and CompuServe focused on being an information utility. AOL's strategy was to make online services available and accessible to the mass market by making them affordable, easy to use, useful and fun. At a time when competing services like CompuServe were charging for each minute of access (which varied based on modem speeds and added extra charges for premium services), AOL priced its service at $19.95 per month for unlimited use of basic tier services beginning in 1996. Within three years, AOL's userbase grew to 10 million, ultimately reaching 26.7 million users at its peak in 2002.

Among many initiatives in the early years of AOL, Case personally championed many innovative online interactive titles and games, including graphical chat environments Habitat (1986) and Club Caribe (1989), the first online interactive fiction series QuantumLink Serial by Tracy Reed (1988), Quantum Space, the first fully automated Play by email game (1989), and the original Dungeons & Dragons title Neverwinter Nights, the first Massively Multiplayer Online Role Playing Game (MMORPG) to depict the adventure with graphics instead of text (1991).

After a decade of quick growth, AOL merged with media giant Time Warner in 2001, creating one of the world's largest media, entertainment and communications companies. The $164 billion acquisition was completed in January 2001, but quickly ran into trouble as part of the dot-com recession, compounded by accounting scandals. Case announced his resignation as chairman in January 2003, although he remained on the company's board of directors for almost three more years.

The failure of the AOL-Time Warner merger is the subject of a book by Nina Munk entitled Fools Rush In: Steve Case, Jerry Levin, and the Unmaking of AOL Time Warner (2005). A photo of Case and Time Warner's Jerry Levin embracing at the announcement of the merger appears on the cover.

In 2005, Case wrote in The Washington Post that "It's now my view that it would be best to 'undo' the merger by splitting Time Warner into several independent companies and allowing AOL to set off on its own path."

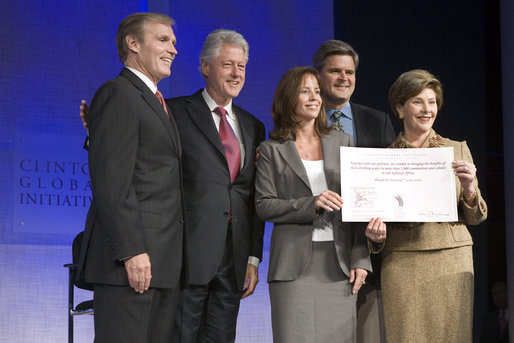
Laura Bush announces a $60 million partnership between the U.S. Government and the Case Foundation at the Clinton Global Initiative conference in New York on September 20, 2006. With her, from left, are: Raymond Chambers, Chairman, MCJ and Amelier Foundations; former President Bill Clinton; and Jean Case and Steve Case.

Case resigned from the Time-Warner board of directors in October 2005, to spend more time working on Revolution LLC, a D.C.-based investment firm he founded in April 2005.

He is also chairman of the Case Foundation, which he and his wife Jean Case created in 1997. In 2011, Steve and Jean Case were honored as Citizens of the Year by the National Conference on Citizenship and interviewed by Stephanie Strom of The New York Times about their record of service and philanthropic endeavors. The Case Foundation also created the Impact Investing Network Map, to track transactions between investors and startups that are socially-conscious.

In 1999, Case received the Golden Plate Award of the American Academy of Achievement. His award was presented by Awards Council member Jim Kimsey. Case was inducted into the Junior Achievement U.S. Business Hall of Fame in 2009. In 2011, he was appointed as a Citizen Regent of the Smithsonian Institution, and became Chair of the Regents in 2020. Case was a co-chair of the Democracy Project at the Bipartisan Policy Center. In May 2014, Case received an Honorary Doctorate of Humane Letters from Georgetown University.

== Investments ==
Following his departure from AOL, Case founded Revolution LLC in 2005. Early investments include Revolution Money, HelloWallet, AddThis, Zipcar, Living Social, and luxury travel club Exclusive Resorts. These last three were considered early bets on the new Web economy, and were early examples of what is now referred to as the 'sharing economy.' Zipcar went public in April 2011, earning a market valuation of more than $1 billion before being acquired by Avis Budget Group in January 2013.

Case also believed he could change the healthcare system in the US and founded Revolution Health Group in April 2005. After a number of acquisitions but disappointing results, the company merged with Waterfront Media in October 2008.

Other exits include the purchase of Revolution Money by American Express in 2009 for $300 million, and on May 29, 2014, MorningStar announced plans to acquire HelloWallet for an undisclosed amount. Additionally, Case recognized another successful exit when Towers Watson acquired early exchange pioneer Extend Health for $435 million in May 2012.

In 2011, Case, along with Ted Leonsis, launched the $450 million Revolution Growth fund. The fund's investments to date include Bigcommerce, Custom Ink, Echo360, FedBid, Handy, Lolly Wolly Doodle, Optoro, Orchard, Resonate, Revolution Foods, Sweetgreen, Sparefoot, Bedrock Manufacturing, LDiscovery, Interactions, Cava, DraftKings, Sportradar, Tala, Tempus, TalkSpace and Uptake. In 2013, he launched the Revolution Ventures fund with Tige Savage and David Golden. Revolution Ventures has invested in BenchPrep, Booker, Busbud, Framebridge, Homesnap, Insikt, OrderUp, RunKeeper, MemberSuite, PolicyGenius, Paro, Bloomscape and Bright Cellars. In 2017, Case launched the Rise of the Rest Seed Fund, investing in companies outside of San Francisco, New York and Boston. The fund has invested in companies across 78 cities and 35 states. Case has also invested directly in other companies, such as Kenyan solar provider M-kopa.

Case controls tens of thousands of acres of land in Hawaii, including a controlling interest in Maui Land & Pineapple Company, and Grove Farm, obtained in a highly controversial transaction which led to years of litigation by the farm's previous owners. Case, the co-founder of AOL, was raised in Hawaii and went to the same high school as Barack Obama; with 57,400 acres, including his 35,170-acre Grove Farm on Kauai, which rents land for sustainable development initiatives, Case is currently the second-largest billionaire landowner in the state.

== Third Wave ==
Case wrote The Third Wave: An Entrepreneur's Vision of the Future in 2016. In the book, he argues innovations in technology will transform the Internet of Things to the Internet of Everything, change the way society thinks about work and challenging the biggest industries in the world.

He calls the new era the "Third Wave" of the internet. The "first wave" saw AOL and other companies lay the foundation for consumers to connect to the internet. The "second wave" saw companies like Google and Facebook build on top of the internet to create search and social networking capabilities, while apps like Instagram leveraged the smartphone revolution. Case says we're entering the "Third Wave," a period when entrepreneurs will leverage technologies to finally disrupt "real world" sectors like health, education, transportation, and energy - and in the process change the way people live their daily lives. Entrepreneurs, large corporations and governments will need to have a new mindset and skills in order to be successful in this new era.

In the "Third Wave," Case also predicts the rise of startup ecosystems outside of California, New York and Boston. What he calls The Rise of the Rest. A confluence of the industry expertise in these regions, technological innovations and public policy changes makes it easier to start and scale a business anywhere.

== Political views and advocacy ==
Steve Case has long advocated for policies that support the rise of startups. In 2012, he advocated for the bipartisan Jumpstart our Business Startups Act, which legalized crowdfunding for early stage companies and included reforms to make it easier for younger companies to make initial public offerings. Congress passed the bill with bipartisan support and it was signed into law on April 5, 2012.

Steve Case is also a staunch supporter of opportunity zones, and is credited for having helped pass them as part of the 2017 Tax Cuts and Jobs Act signed by President Trump. Case stated that he believes the policy will help create real estate incentives to create the infrastructure co-working space needed to attract entrepreneurs. He referred to the policy as a "game changer," stating that opportunity zones will be a "terrific place for entrepreneurs to cluster." In a 2019 interview with Fox News host Maria Bartiromo, Case stated that Trump's passage of opportunity zones was a "step in the right direction in trying to get more money from the coasts to other parts of the country."

Case is an avid advocate for comprehensive immigration reform, arguing that easing restraints on immigration is necessary for America's future entrepreneurial economy. He particularly emphasizes the impact that reform would have on recent engineering graduates and the tech sector.

Case contends that making it easier for foreign students educated in America to stay post graduation is vital to winning the war for talent, given the sheer high demand for engineers and entrepreneurs and current visa rules preventing tech companies from hiring the best foreign talent. He argues not only for reforming the H-1B visa program, but also implementing a Startup Visa program that welcomes immigrant entrepreneurs with proven ideas to launch their startups in the United States. Case traditionally has avoided politics, quietly building nonpartisan relationships with both Democrats and Republicans.

Fueled by concern that Donald Trump's restrictive immigration policies would result in loss of jobs as many Fortune 500 companies were founded by immigrants or their children he made an exception to remaining nonpartisan by endorsing Hillary Clinton for the 2016 presidency. However, in 2017, Case met with President Trump stating that he appreciates "that the administration wants to connect with the men and women that are leading Silicon Valley’s/New York’s tech giants." In 2024, Case stated that he "was pleased to hear President Trump express his support for issuing green cards to noncitizen graduates of U.S. colleges and universities earlier this year." In 2019, Case praised a portion of Donald Trump's State of the Union address, stating the importance of "focusing on greatness and not gridlock."

In a 2022 interview with Kara Swisher, Case indicated his preference for a nonpartisan approach to advocacy, and emphasized the importance of bringing Republicans and Democrats together over conversations that transcend the traditional partisan political divide, such as efforts to improve the start-up ecosystem.

In 2017, Case also hired J.D. Vance to work at Revolution LLC to help advance his effort to promote startup growth in parts of the United States outside of major tech hubs like Silicon Valley, Boston, and New York City. After Vance was elected vice president, Case wrote on November 8, 2024, that everybody having access to the benefits of entrepreneurship and innovation is something "[he] knows[s] vice-president-elect JD Vance cares about."

== Family ==
His father, Daniel H. Case, is the founding partner of the Hawaiian law firm of Case Lombardi & Pettit. His mother Carol was an elementary school teacher. His parents had three other children. In June 2002, his brother Dan died from brain cancer, aged 44.

Case is a cousin of Ed Case, who was a U.S. representative from Hawaii from 2002 to 2007 and since 2019.

In 1985, Case married Joanne Barker whom he had met while attending Williams College. The couple had three children and divorced in 1996. Two years later, in 1998, he married former AOL executive Jean Villanueva in a ceremony officiated by Billy Graham.

Case donated $10 million to Punahou School to build a junior high school named after his parents. He is a Christian.

Business positions
| New office | Chief Executive Officer of America Online; 1991–2001 | Succeeded by Barry Schuler |
