= Jim Kimsey =

Co-founder, America Online (AOL) (1939-2016)

- Born: September 15, 1939; Washington, D.C., U.S.
- Died: March 1, 2016 (aged 76); McLean, Virginia, U.S.
- Education: Georgetown University; United States Military Academy
- Occupations: Founder, Chairman/CEO of America Online (AOL)
- Website: kimseyfoundation.org

James Verlin Kimsey (September 15, 1939 – March 1, 2016) was the co-founder of AOL. He was the first chairman of the company and its CEO until 1995. Although Kimsey is best known for having helped to create AOL, he also spearheaded many other business, military and philanthropic endeavors.

== Early life and education ==
Kimsey was born in Washington D.C. in 1939 and grew up in Arlington, Virginia.

After being dismissed from Gonzaga College High School, he attended St. John's College High School, followed by Georgetown University for one term on an honors scholarship, and then the United States Military Academy at West Point, New York, from which he graduated in 1962.

== Military ==
Kimsey served in the U.S. Army, becoming a lieutenant and seeing active participation in U.S. interventions in the Dominican Republic and Vietnam. He served three combat tours as an Airborne Ranger, two in the Vietnam War, earning various awards for service and valor.

In July 2005, Kimsey was inducted into the U.S. Army Rangers Hall of Fame, which recognizes the United States' most extraordinary Rangers. In 2008, he received the Distinguished Graduate Award for Outstanding Service to the Nation from the U.S. Military Academy at West Point.

== Business ==
In 1970, after eight years in the military, Kimsey bought a building in downtown Washington, D.C., renting out the top floor. On the ground floor, he built and opened a bar known as The Exchange. He "became successful and opened other bars in the 1970s."

In May 1983, Kimsey was brought in as a manufacturing consultant for Control Video Corporation by his West Point friend Frank Caufield, an investor in the company. CVC was founded by William von Meister to market an online service called GameLine for the Atari 2600 video game console. Von Meister had previously hired Steve Case as a marketing consultant on the recommendation of Case's brother, investment banker Dan Case. Von Meister quietly left the company in early 1985.

Shortly thereafter, Control Video was reorganized as Quantum Computer Services, with co-founders Kimsey as CEO, Marc Seriff as CTO, and Steve Case. Quantum Computer Services was later reorganized as AOL. Kimsey served as CEO until 1995, when Steve Case took the helm.

Kimsey was a key investor in, and a director of Triple Canopy, a private military contractor.

== Philanthropy ==
Kimsey was Chairman Emeritus of Refugees International, an independent advocacy group that works to protect refugees and end the cause of displacement. Kimsey also was a member of the board of the Vietnam Veterans Memorial Fund and as a Senior Fellow to the Department of Defense Business Board.

He was a member of the James Madison Council of the Library of Congress. In 2010, Speaker Nancy Pelosi appointed Kimsey to the Library of Congress Trust Fund Board, which oversees the investment of all gifts for the benefit of the Library’s collection and services. He served on the Executive Committee of the National Symphony Orchestra.

His philanthropic endeavors also included the Kimsey Athletic Center at West Point, which he established in 1995. Kimsey also funded internships for military academy students through the Kimsey Scholarship. Cadets and midshipmen from West Point, the Air Force Academy, and the Naval Academy were competitively selected to serve in significant offices of government such as the Supreme Court, State Department, and Congress through the scholarship.

== Honors ==
Kimsey received Presidential appointments to the Kennedy Center Board of Trustees and the West Point Board of Visitors. In 2001, Secretary of State Colin Powell named Mr. Kimsey as Chairman of the International Commission on Missing Persons, an organization dedicated to identifying hundreds of thousands of missing from conflicts and natural disasters around the world, through DNA research.

One of the office buildings on the former AOL Campus in Ashburn Virginia, now demolished, was named The James Kimsey Center in his honor.

== Death ==
Kimsey died in McLean, Virginia of cancer on March 1, 2016, aged 76. Kimsey had three sons and four grandchildren.

== Personal ==
Kimsey resided in McLean, Virginia and had three grown sons: Mike, Mark and Ray.

In 1995, Kimsey established The Kimsey Foundation. His philanthropy includes the Kimsey Athletic Center at West Point.

In 2000, Kimsey purchased Marden House, designed by Frank Lloyd Wright, for $2.5 million.

In 2001, Kimsey was named Chairman of the International Commission on Missing Persons in Bosnia by Colin Powell.

On October 30, 2006, Kimsey was appointed to the board of trustees of the John F. Kennedy Center for the Performing Arts by President George W. Bush.

In May 2018, after his death, Kimsey's house in McLean was listed for sale for $62.95 million.
