= AVS =

AVS or Avs may refer to:

== Label ==
- AVS (halal certification), French non-profit organization that certifies and inspects halal food product

== People ==
- AVS (actor), Indian actor and comedian

== Sports ==
- AVS Futebol SAD, an association football club in Vila das Aves, Portugal
- Colorado Avalanche, an NHL hockey team

== Schools ==
- Abbey Vocational School, a secondary school in County Donegal, Ireland
- Amman Valley School, a bilingual (Welsh and English) secondary school in Wales

== Science ==
- American Vacuum Society, a member society of the American Institute of Physics, now known only as AVS
- Angle of Vanishing Stability, the angle at which a boat will capsize
- Acid volatile sulfide

=== Audio video ===
- Audio Video Standard, a Chinese multimedia standard
- Auditory Visual Stimulation, a controversial princip of the called Mind machine, or psychowalkman

=== Hardware ===
- Adaptive voltage scaling, Adaptive Voltage Scaling as power optimization techniques
- Adjustable Voltage Supply (AVS)

=== Software ===
- Advanced Visualization Studio, a music visualization plugin for Winamp
- Alexa Voice Service, a cloud-based voice recognition service
- AOL Active Virus Shield, a discontinued free antivirus utility made available by AOL
- AviSynth, a script-based frameserver
- Cisco application virtual switch

=== Verification systems ===
- Address verification service, a security measure in credit card processing
- Adult Verification System, a system used by websites to confirm that someone accessing their site is of the age of majority

== Other uses ==
- Alleanza Verdi e Sinistra, known in English as the Greens and Left Alliance, an Italian electoral coalition composed of two political parties: Italian Left and Green Europe
- American Viola Society, an organization of viola players and enthusiasts
- American Vegan Society, an organization that promotes veganism in the United States
- Atharvaveda, aka Atharvaveda-Shaunakiya, a sacred Hindu text
- AVS-36, Soviet automatic rifle
- Nintendo Advanced Video System, or AVS, the original name for the Nintendo Entertainment System
- A Vampyre Story, the 2007 Autumn Moon Entertainment adventure game
- A US Navy hull classification symbol: Aviation stores issue ship (AVS)
- Autonomous vehicles, or AVs
