= Marc Seriff =

American businessman

Marc S. Seriff (born May 5, 1948 in Austin, Texas) is best known as the CTO and co-founder of AOL, along with Jim Kimsey (CEO), Steve Case, and William von Meister (as Control Video Corporation).

== Biography ==
Seriff received his B.S. in Mathematics and Computer Science from the University of Texas at Austin in 1971 and an M.S. in Electrical Engineering and Computer Science from Massachusetts Institute of Technology (MIT) in 1974.

In 1974, he was one of the first dozen people at Telenet Communications. He later served as an executive of several audio and data communications companies, including GTE Corporation, Venture Technology, Digital Music, Inc., and Control Video Corporation. In 1985, he co-founded Quantum Computer Services (later known as America Online), where he served as a Senior Vice President until 1996.

From August 1997 to May 1998, he was a director of InteliHome, which merged with Global Converging Technologies. From January to June 1998, he was CEO of Eos Management, LLC. He also served as a director of U.S. Online Communications.

In a 2007 interview, Seriff cited two people who influenced him at a young age: J.C.R. Licklider, one of his professors in graduate school at MIT, and Larry Roberts, whom he met and worked for at Telenet.
