= Marne Levine =

American businesswoman (born 1970)

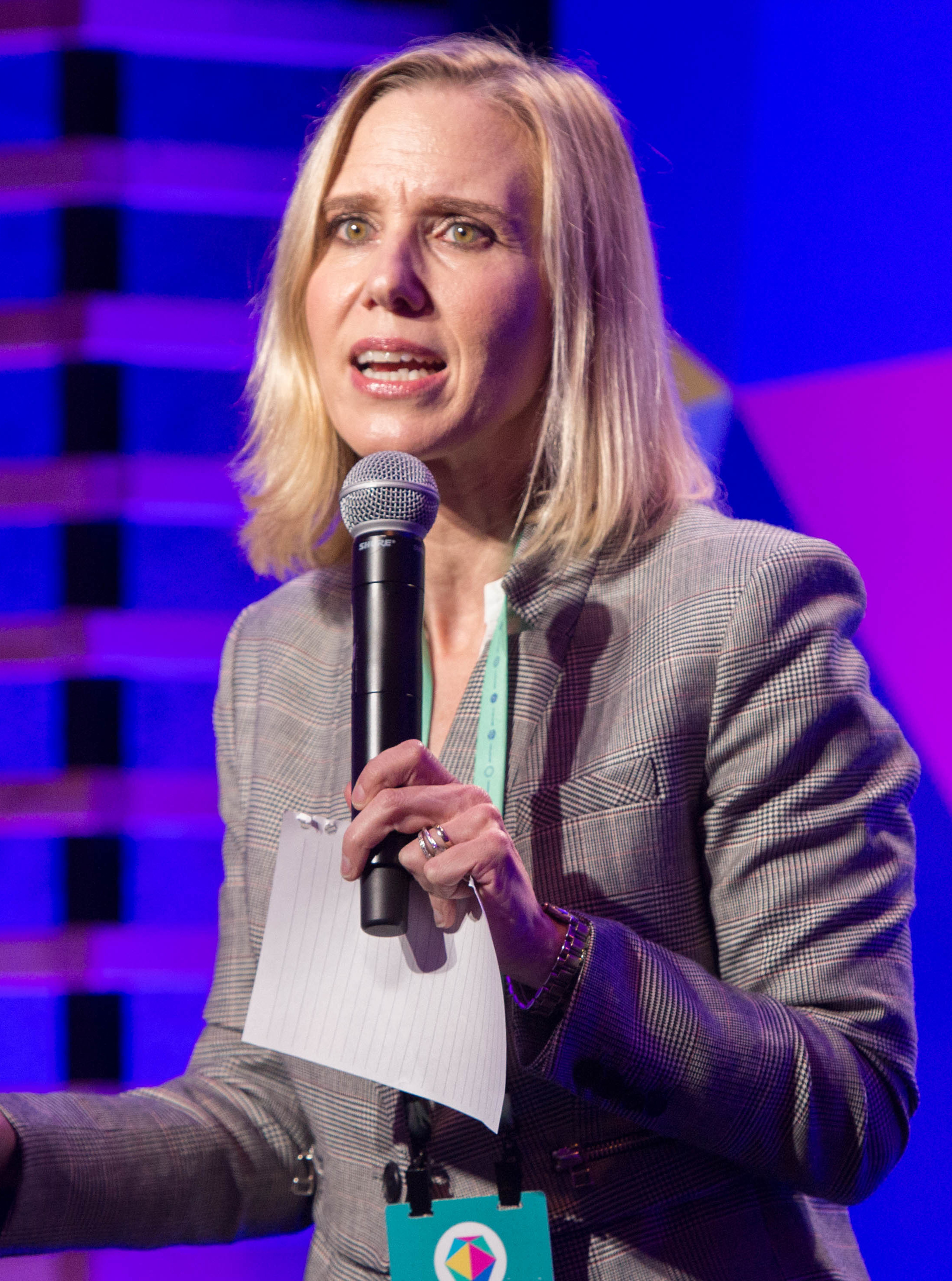
- Levine in 2017
- Born: Marne Lynn Levine; October 1, 1970 (age 56)
- Education: Miami University, Ohio (BA); Harvard University (MBA)
- Title: Former chief business officer, Meta Platforms
- Board member of: Chegg; Women for Women International
- Spouse: Philip Deutch (m. 2003)
- Children: 2
- Relatives: John M. Deutch (father-in-law)

Marne Lynn Levine (born 1970) is an American businesswoman. She was the chief business officer at Meta Platforms (formerly Facebook, Inc.) until February 2023. Previously, she was the first chief operating officer of Instagram. She also served as a special economic policy assistant to President Barack Obama. She was the chief of staff for the National Economic Council.

== Early life ==
Marne Lynn Levine is the daughter of Mark Levine, an ophthalmologist of Shaker Heights, Ohio, and Teri Levine. She was born to Jewish parents and graduated from Laurel School in 1988. She majored in political science and speech communications at Miami University in Ohio and graduated in 1992. In 2005, she graduated from Harvard Business School.

== Career ==
From 1993 to 2000, she worked at the United States Treasury Department on issues like the 1997 Asian financial crisis and predatory lending. She was the chief of staff from 2001 to 2003 for Harvard University president Larry Summers. From 2006 to 2008, she was a product manager at Revolution Money. From 2009 to 2010, she served in the administration of President Barack Obama as the chief of staff for the National Economic Council and special assistant to the president for economic policy.

Levine was vice president of global public policy for Facebook from 2010 to 2014, when she became the first chief operating officer of Instagram. In 2018, she became the vice president of global partnerships, business and corporate development for Facebook. In June 2021, Levine was named chief business officer of Facebook, Inc. which was renamed Meta Platforms. She stepped down from the role in February 2023.

== Boards ==
Levine is a member of the board of Lean In, a non-profit founded by Facebook COO Sheryl Sandberg to empower women. Levine is also on the board of directors of Chegg and Women for Women International. She is a member of the Trilateral Commission.

== Personal life ==
On June 21, 2003, Levine married Philip Deutch who was then a venture capitalist. They are Jewish and have two sons. Her father-in-law, John M. Deutch, was the director of central intelligence (DCI) during the presidency of Bill Clinton.

Levine suffered a partial hearing loss at age four, but because of embarrassment did not start using hearing aids until 2015, when she was in her 40s; she said they have improved her life "exponentially".

== Recognition ==
She was recognized as one of the BBC's 100 women of 2016.
