= Tracy Reed (writer) =

American writer

Tracy Reed is an American writer who created the first episodic online story, the QuantumLink Serial on AOL (then called Quantum Computer Services).

The series debuted in 1988, and was played out in online chat rooms, emails and traditional narrative. The series also went by the name The AppleLink Serial and The PC-Link Serial on those services before they were all unified under the AOL brand when Quantum changed its name. After each week's chapter was published, users wrote to author Reed suggesting how they could be part of the story. Each week Reed chose one to a handful of users on each of the three services and wrote them into the story, depicting how they interacted with the fictional characters. The project was personally greenlighted by AOL Marketing VP (later President) Steve Case and produced by Kathi McHugh.

Later titles, the most famous of which was The Spot added photos and video to the stories, and introduced the advertising-supported model that became standard during the Internet dot-com boom. Reed's work also is a building block in the development of Alternate reality games.

In 2010 a Northern California interactive theater group announced that they were producing a new interactive drama by Reed, "The Koi Pond."
