= PlayNET =

American former ISP

PlayNET (or PlayNet) was an American online service for Commodore 64 home computers that operated from 1984 to 1987. It was operated by the company PlayNet, Inc of Troy, New York.

== History ==
PlayNet was founded in 1983 by two former GE Global Research employees, Dave Panzl and Howard Goldberg, as the first person-to-person, online communication and game network to feature home computer based graphics.

The founders launched the business initially with their own money. They then raised over $2.5 million from a variety of investors, including the venture capital funds of the town of North Greenbush, NY, Key Bank, Alan Patricof & Associates, and the New York State Science and Technology Foundation, and a group of individual investors through a limited R&D partnership led by McGinn Smith.

PlayNet was initially successful and had more than 5000 subscribers, but struggled to grow beyond that, and was short on funds. PlayNet approached Commodore to become Commodore's official online service, but was rejected. Commodore instead suggested to a rival that they obtain PlayNet's software.

In 1985, PlayNet licensed their system to Control Video Corporation (CVC, later renamed Quantum Computer Services), which in October 1991 changed its name to America Online. The modified version of the PlayNet software (Quantum Link or Q-Link) was ported by Quantum to the Apple II, and then to Macintosh and MS-DOS to create the first version of the AOL software. As recently as 2005, some aspects of the original PlayNet communication protocols still appeared to be used by AOL.

The PlayNet offices were initially located in the J Building on Peoples Avenue in Troy, NY part of the Rensselaer Polytechnic Institute incubator program. It subsequently moved to RPI's Technology Park in North Greenbush, NY.

PlayNet declared bankruptcy in March, 1986 and ceased operations in 1988 after Quantum stopped paying royalties.

The service had two membership options: an $8/month service charge plus $2.75/hour connect time charge, or no service charge and $3.75 per hour connection charge. File downloads were charged a flat rate of $0.50 each

The fictional Internet company depicted in the second season of the AMC drama series Halt and Catch Fire is believed to be based on PlayNet.

== Software details ==
PlayNet was originally designed around online interactive games which allowed chatting while playing. PlayNet also featured electronic mail, online chat, bulletin boards, file sharing libraries, online shopping, and instant messaging (using On Line Messages, or OLMs). Games were mostly 'traditional' games and some well-known boardgames. Games were programmed in a mixture of BASIC and assembly language.

Unlike other online systems of the era, PlayNet was highly graphical and required client software, and included error correction in the communication protocols. The server software for PlayNet ran on Stratus fault-tolerant computers and was written in PL/1. AOL continued to use Stratus computers and parts of the PlayNet server software until the late 1990s or later.

The client software on the Commodore 64 ran a multitasking pseudo-operating system based on a finite-state machine language.

== Game list ==
- Checkers
- Chess
- Backgammon
- Hangman
- Bridge
- Stratego
- Connect 4
- Chinese Chess
- Go
- Several others

Games/features never finished/released:

- Multiplayer Dungeons & Dragons
- Poker
- Various other card games and wargames
- Auditoriums and panel discussions

Connections to PlayNet were made by modems at 300 baud via X.25 providers such as Tymnet and Telenet. In 1985, pricing was $6 per month, with additional fees of $2 per hour, after a one-time membership fee of $30.

The system competed with many other online services like CompuServe and The Source, as well as bulletin board systems (single or multiuser). PlayNet's graphical display was better than many of these competing systems because it used specialized client software with a nonstandard protocol. However, this specialized software and nonstandard protocol limited its market to the Commodore 64.

In 2005, hobbyists managed to reverse engineer the communications protocol and allow people running the QuantumLink software on an emulator or original hardware (via a serial cable) to run a reduced version of the service called Quantum Link Reloaded.

== Reception ==
Ahoy! in 1986 called PlayNET "one of the best values around for Commodore users". The reviewer stated that he had found the network's users "to be just about the friendliest group of people around", but criticized the slow disk load times and the network's weekday hours of operation.
