= 770 Broadway =

Commercial building in Manhattan, New York

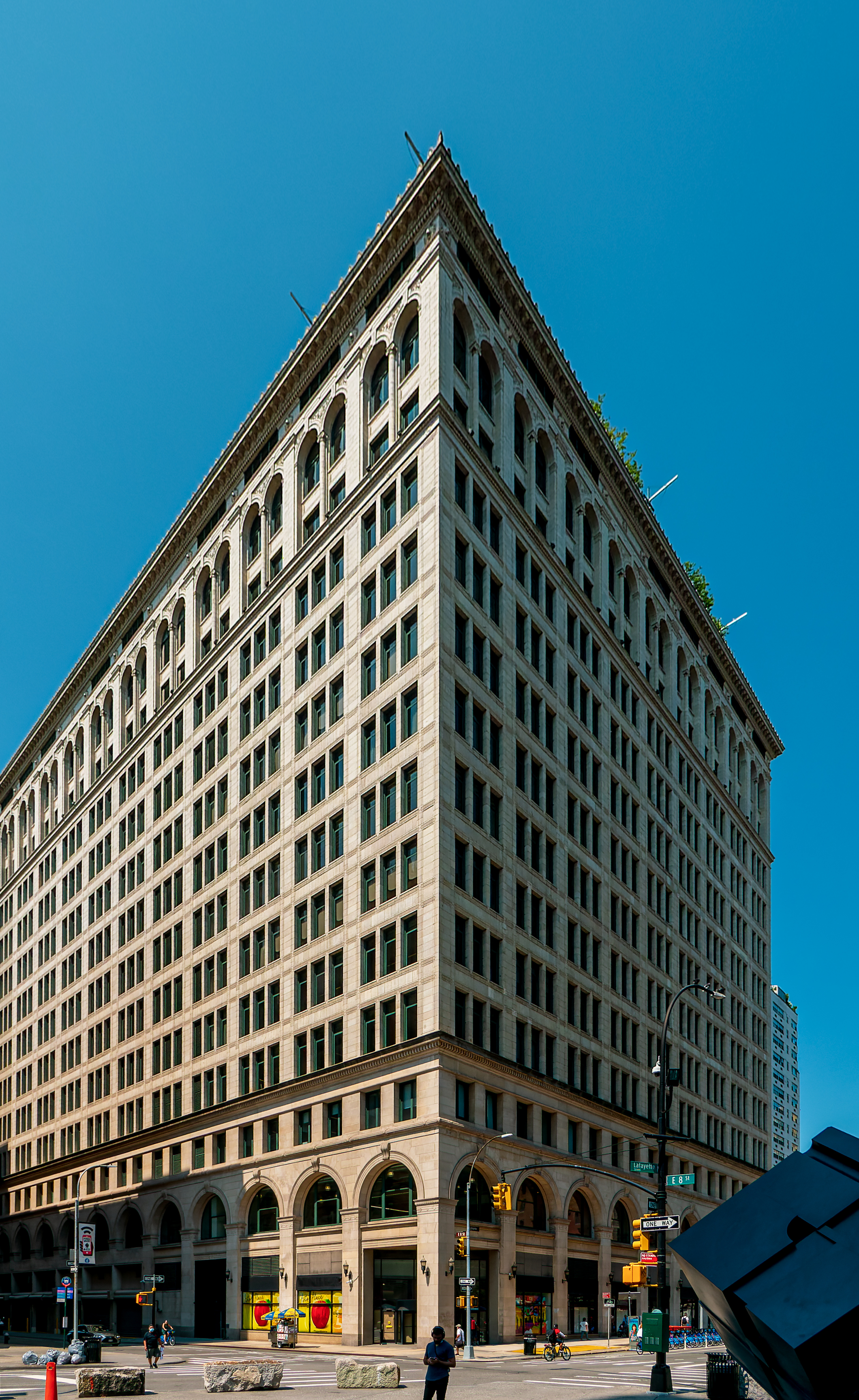
- 770 Broadway in August 2021

General information
- Type: Office, retail
- Architectural style: Cast-iron architecture
- Location: 770 Broadway; New York, NY 10003; U.S.
- Coordinates: 40.7307°N 73.9913°W
- Completed: 1907; 119 years ago
- Owner: Vornado Realty Trust

Technical details
- Floor count: 15
- Lifts/elevators: 14 passenger, 6 freight

Design and construction
- Architects: Daniel Burnham (1907); Hugh Hardy (2000 renovation)

770 Broadway is a 1,200,000-square-foot (110,000 m^{2}) landmarked mixed-use commercial office building in NoHo, Manhattan, in Lower Manhattan, New York City, occupying an entire square block between 9th Street on the north, Fourth Avenue to the east, 8th Street to the south, and Broadway to the west. The building is owned and managed by Vornado Realty Trust. It was completed in 1907 and renovated in 2000 per a design by Hugh Hardy.

Major tenants include Wegmans, with an 82,000-square-foot (7,600 m^{2}) ground floor retail store that opened in 2023, Meta Platforms, which occupies 800,000 square feet (74,000 m^{2}) and has sole roof access, and Yahoo!, which occupies the fourth, fifth, sixth and ninth floors.

The building has one of the largest property tax bills in commercial real estate: $19.6 million in 2022.

== History ==
770 Broadway was built between 1903 and 1907 and was designed by Daniel Burnham as an annex to the original Wanamaker's department store in New York, which was across 9th Street to the north. The two buildings were connected by a sky bridge, dubbed the "Bridge of Progress", as well as a tunnel under 9th Street. The building originally included a central court and an auditorium with a pipe organ that hosted top musicians and orchestras, and was also an early television studio.

In 1954, Wanamaker's closed as department stores expanded to the suburbs and major retail migrated toward Midtown. The northern lot was sold in 1955. In 1956, a fire gutted the original Wanamaker's department store building while it was under demolition, injuring 77 people. The annex at 770 Broadway survived and was leased up; in 1958, the ground floor was leased to the United States Army, in 1959, Manhattan Savings Bank leased space for a branch in the building.

In November 1996, Kmart opened a store in the ground floor retail space. Two years later in July 1998, Vornado Realty Trust acquired the building for $149 million. In 2000, the building was renovated to a design by Hugh Hardy.

In 2007, AOL moved its headquarters to 152,000 square feet (14,100 m^{2}) in the building. Vornado obtained a $700 million loan for the building in 2016. Facebook Inc. (later Meta) gradually leased space in the building, occupying most of the structure, or about 813,000 square feet (75,500 m^{2}), by the early 2020s.

In July 2021, the Kmart store was closed and the space was leased to Wegmans, which opened a store there in October 2023. The building was refinanced again in 2022 with a $700 million loan. After Meta downsized its space in the building, Vornado agreed in 2024 to lease 1.1 million square feet (100,000 m^{2}) of office space to New York University. Meta will continue to occupy approximately around 500,000 sq ft of office space in the building.
