= AOL =

American internet portal

AOL Media LLC
- Formerly: Control Video Corporation (1983–1985); Quantum Computer Services (1985–1991); America Online Inc. (1991–2009); AOL Inc. (2009-2021)
- Type: Subsidiary
- Traded as: NYSE: AOL (1992-2003; 2009-2015)
- Founded: 1983; 43 years ago (as Control Video Corporation); 2009; 17 years ago (as AOL Inc.)
- Founders: Marc Seriff; Steve Case; Jim Kimsey; William von Meister
- Headquarters: 770 Broadway, New York City, U.S. 40.7308°N 73.9914°W
- Area served: Worldwide
- Services: Web portal
- Owner: Time Warner (2001–2009); Verizon (2015–2021); Apollo Global (2021–2026); Bending Spoons (2026–present)
- Number of employees: 5,600
- Parent: Yahoo! Inc. (2021–2026); Bending Spoons (2026–present)
- Website: aol.com

AOL Media LLC (formerly a predecessor company known as AOL Inc. and originally known as America Online) is an American web portal and former online service provider based in New York City. It is owned by Bending Spoons.

AOL traces its history to PlayNET, an online service. PlayNET licensed its software to Quantum Link, which went online in November 1985. An IBM PC compatible client was launched in 1988. The service was renamed as America Online (abbreviated as AOL) in 1989. AOL grew to become the largest online service, ahead of established players CompuServe and Prodigy. By 1995, AOL had about three million active users.

AOL was at one point the most recognized Internet-related brand in the United States. AOL was an internet service provider (ISP) and once provided dial-up Internet access to millions of Americans and pioneered chat rooms and instant messaging with AOL Instant Messenger (AIM). In 1998, AOL purchased Netscape for US$4.2 billion. As of 2000, AOL was providing internet service to over 20 million consumers. In 2001, at the height of its popularity, it purchased Time Warner for stock in the largest merger in US history. AOL shrank rapidly thereafter, partly due to the decline of dial-up Internet access and the rise of broadband.

AOL was spun off from Time Warner in 2009, with Tim Armstrong appointed the new CEO. Under his leadership, the company invested in media brands and advertising technologies. In 2015, AOL was acquired by Verizon Communications for $4.4 billion, and was merged with Yahoo the following year after it was also acquired by Verizon under Verizon Media. In August 2021, Verizon sold Verizon Media (and thus AOL) to affiliates of Apollo Global Management for $5 billion, In January 2026, Apollo sold AOL to Bending Spoons for $1.5 billion.

== History ==
Evolution of AOL
- 1983: Control Video Corporation (CVC) was founded by William von Meister and ran a short-lived online service for Atari
- 1985: After CVC dissolved, a new company was founded as Quantum Computer Services, which ran QuantumLink
- 1989: Quantum unified its individual internet services under a single product, branding the platform as America Online
- 1993: During Steve Case's years as CEO in the early 1990s, the company adopted AOL as its corporate name, went public, and launched its free trial CD campaign
- 1995: AOL gradually shifted from being a closed-off proprietary network into a major ISP for the World Wide Web
- 1997: CompuServe, a major competitor, was acquired, single-handedly eliminating AOL's biggest rival in dial-up internet
- 1999: At its absolute peak, AOL reached a market valuation of $222 billion, and acquired a slew of internet companies like Netscape, MovieFone and MapQuest
- 2001: With its dot-com era stock, AOL acquired Time Warner, the largest traditional media conglomerate, in what was the single largest merger at the time
- 2003: AOL Time Warner, as the merged company was called, suffered from the end of the Dot-com bubble, which led to heavy losses, goodwill write-downs, and the AOL part of its name being dropped, with the name being reverted back to Time Warner
- 2009: Time Warner spent several years pivoting AOL towards digital advertising before spinning it off due to declining revenue
- 2015: Verizon acquired AOL with plans to reposition the company as a major advertising tech business
- 2017: Yahoo was acquired by Verizon and consolidated with AOL into Oath Inc.
- 2019: Oath was rebranded as Verizon Media to emphasize closer branding with its corporate parent and improve synergy
- 2021: Apollo Global acquired Verizon Media, and rebranded it Yahoo Inc, with AOL continuing as an operating subsidiary
- 2026: Bending Spoons acquired AOL from Yahoo to expand its portfolio of legacy internet assets and later went public

=== 1983–1991: early years ===
AOL began in 1983, as a short-lived venture called Control Video Corporation (CVC), founded by William von Meister. Its sole product was an online service called GameLine for the Atari 2600 video game console, after von Meister's idea of buying music on demand was rejected by Warner Communications. Subscribers bought a modem from the company for $49.95 and paid a one-time $15 setup fee. GameLine permitted subscribers to temporarily download games and keep track of high scores, at a cost of $1 per game. The telephone disconnected and the downloaded game would remain in GameLine's Master Module, playable until the user turned off the console or downloaded another game.

In January 1983, Steve Case was hired as a marketing consultant for Control Video on the recommendation of his brother, investment banker Dan Case. In May 1983, Jim Kimsey became a manufacturing consultant for Control Video, which was near bankruptcy. Kimsey was brought in by his West Point friend Frank Caufield, an investor in the company. In early 1985, von Meister left the company.

In May 1985, Quantum Computer Services, an online services company, was founded by Kimsey from the remnants of Control Video, with Kimsey as chief executive officer and Marc Seriff as chief technology officer. The technical team consisted of Seriff, Tom Ralston, Ray Heinrich, Steve Trus, Ken Huntsman, Janet Hunter, Dave Brown, Craig Dykstra, Doug Coward, and Mike Ficco. In 1987, Case was promoted again to executive vice-president. Kimsey soon began to groom Case to take over the role of CEO, which he did when Kimsey retired in 1991.

Kimsey changed the company's strategy, and in 1985, launched a dedicated online service for Commodore 64 and 128 computers, originally called Quantum Link ("Q-Link" for short). The Quantum Link software was based on software licensed from PlayNet, Inc., which was founded in 1983 by Howard Goldberg and Dave Panzl. The service was different from other online services as it used the computing power of the Commodore 64 and the Apple II rather than just a "dumb" terminal. It passed tokens back and forth and provided a fixed-price service tailored for home users. In May 1988, Quantum and Apple launched AppleLink Personal Edition for Apple II and Macintosh computers. In August 1988, Quantum launched PC Link, a service for IBM-compatible PCs developed in a joint venture with the Tandy Corporation. After the company parted ways with Apple in October 1989, Quantum changed the service's name to America Online. Case promoted and sold AOL as the online service for people unfamiliar with computers, in contrast to CompuServe, which was well established in the technical community.

From the beginning, AOL included online games in its mix of products; many classic and casual games were included in the original PlayNet software system. The company introduced many innovative online interactive titles and games, including:

- Graphical chat environments Habitat (1986–1988) from LucasArts.
- The first online interactive fiction series QuantumLink Serial by Tracy Reed (1988).
- Quantum Space, the first fully automated play-by-mail game (1989–1991).

=== 1991–1999: Internet age ===
First AOL logo as "America Online", used from 1991 to 2005

In February 1991, AOL for IBM PC compatibles running MS-DOS was launched using a GeoWorks interface; it was followed a year later by AOL for Windows 3.0. This coincided with growth in pay-based online services, like Prodigy, CompuServe, and GEnie.

During the early 1990s, the average subscription lasted for about 25 months and accounted for $350 in total revenue. Advertisements invited modem owners to "Try America Online FREE", promising free software and trial membership. AOL discontinued Q-Link and PC Link in late 1994. In September 1993, AOL added Usenet access to its features. This is commonly referred to as the "Eternal September", as Usenet's cycle of new users was previously dominated by smaller numbers of college and university freshmen gaining access in September and taking a few weeks to acclimate. This also coincided with a new "carpet bombing" marketing campaign by CMO Jan Brandt to distribute as many free trial AOL trial disks as possible through nonconventional distribution partners. At one point, 50% of the CDs produced worldwide had an AOL logo. AOL quickly surpassed GEnie, and by the mid-1990s, it passed Prodigy (which for several years allowed AOL advertising) and CompuServe. In November 1994, AOL purchased Booklink for its web browser, to give its users web access. In 1996, AOL replaced Booklink with a browser based on Internet Explorer, reportedly in exchange for inclusion of AOL in Windows.

AOL launched services with the National Education Association, the American Federation of Teachers, National Geographic, the Smithsonian Institution, the Library of Congress, Pearson, Scholastic, ASCD, NSBA, NCTE, Discovery Networks, Turner Education Services (CNN Newsroom), NPR, The Princeton Review, Stanley Kaplan, Barron's, Highlights for Kids, the US Department of Education, and many other education providers. AOL offered the first real-time homework help service (the Teacher Pager—1990; prior to this, AOL provided homework help bulletin boards), the first service by children, for children (Kids Only Online, 1991), the first online service for parents (the Parents Information Network, 1991), the first online courses (1988), the first omnibus service for teachers (the Teachers' Information Network, 1990), the first online exhibit (Library of Congress, 1991), the first parental controls, and many other online education firsts.

AOL purchased search engine WebCrawler in 1995, but sold it to Excite the following year; the deal made Excite the sole search and directory service on AOL. After the deal closed in March 1997, AOL launched its own branded search engine, based on Excite, called NetFind. This was renamed AOL Search in 1999.

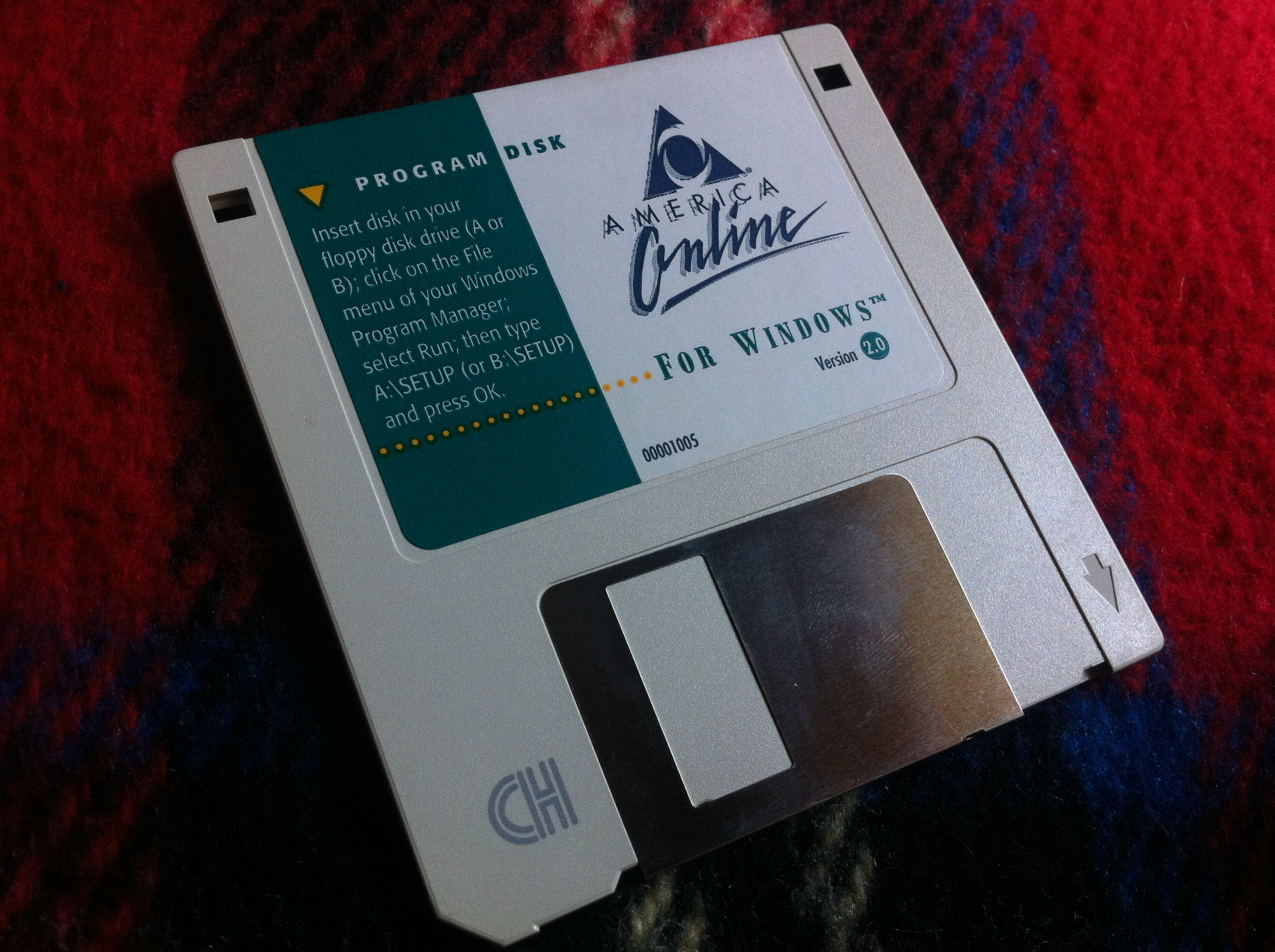
America Online 2.0 software for Microsoft Windows (1994)

AOL charged its users an hourly fee until December 1996, when the company changed to a flat monthly rate of $19.95. During this time, AOL connections were flooded with users trying to connect, and many canceled their accounts due to constant busy signals. A commercial was made featuring Steve Case telling people AOL was working day and night to fix the problem. Within three years, AOL's user base grew to 10 million people. In 1995, AOL was headquartered at 8619 Westwood Center Drive in the Tysons Corner CDP in unincorporated Fairfax County, Virginia in the Washington, D.C. metropolitan area. near the Town of Vienna.

AOL was quickly running out of room in October 1996 for its network at the Fairfax County campus. In mid-1996, AOL moved to 22000 AOL Way in Dulles, unincorporated Loudoun County, Virginia to provide room for future growth. In a five-year landmark agreement with the most popular operating system, AOL was bundled with Windows software.

In March 1996, the short-lived eWorld was purchased by AOL. In 1997, about half of all US homes with Internet access had it through AOL. During this time, AOL's content channels, under Jason Seiken, including News, Sports, and Entertainment, experienced their greatest growth as AOL become the dominant online service internationally with more than 34 million subscribers.

In August 1996, AOL experienced a total outage that lasted 19 hours and took over six million people offline.

In February 1998, AOL acquired CompuServe Interactive Services (CIS) via WorldCom (later Verizon), which kept Compuware's networking business.

In November 1998, AOL announced it would acquire Netscape, best known for their web browser, in a major $4.2 billion deal. The deal closed in March 1999. Another large acquisition in December 1999 was that of MapQuest, for $1.1 billion.

=== 2000–2008: As AOL Time Warner ===
AOL Time Warner logo used from 2001 to 2003

In January 2000, as new broadband technologies were being rolled out around the New York City metropolitan area and elsewhere across the United States, AOL and Time Warner announced plans to merge, forming AOL Time Warner, Inc. The terms of the deal called for AOL shareholders to own 55% of the new, combined company. The deal closed in January 2001. The new company was led by executives from AOL, SBI, and Time Warner. Gerald Levin, who had served as CEO of Time Warner, was CEO of the new company. Steve Case served as chairman, J. Michael Kelly (from AOL) was the chief financial officer, Robert W. Pittman (from AOL) and Dick Parsons (from Time Warner) served as co-chief operating officers. In 2002, Jonathan Miller became CEO of AOL. The following year, AOL Time Warner dropped the "AOL" from its name. It was the largest merger in history when completed with the combined value of the companies at $360 billion. This value fell sharply, to as low as $120 billion, as markets repriced AOL's valuation as a pure internet firm more modestly when combined with the traditional media and cable business. This status did not last long, and the company's value rose again within three months. By the end of that year, the tide had turned against "pure" internet companies, with many collapsing under falling stock prices, and even the strongest companies in the field losing up to 75% of their market value. The decline continued through 2001, but even with the losses, AOL was among the internet giants that continued to outperform brick and mortar companies.

In 2004, along with the launch of AOL 9.0 Optimized, AOL also made available the option of personalized greetings which would enable the user to hear his or her name while accessing basic functions and mail alerts, or while logging in or out. In 2005, AOL broadcast the Live 8 concert live over the Internet, and thousands of users downloaded clips of the concert over the following months. In late 2005, AOL released AOL Safety & Security Center, a bundle of McAfee Antivirus, CA anti-spyware, and proprietary firewall and phishing protection software. News reports in late 2005 identified companies such as Yahoo!, Microsoft, and Google as candidates for turning AOL into a joint venture. Those plans were abandoned when it was revealed in December 2005, that Google would purchase a 5% share of AOL for $1 billion.

Former AOL logo, used from 2005 to 2009

In April 2006, AOL announced that it would retire the full name America Online. The official name of the service became AOL, and the full name of the Time Warner subdivision became AOL LLC.

In June 2006, AOL offered a new program called AOL Active Security Monitor, a diagnostic tool to monitor and rate PC security status, and recommended additional security software from AOL or Download.com.

In August 2006, AOL released AOL Active Virus Shield, a free product developed by Kaspersky Lab, that did not require an AOL account, only an internet email address. The ISP side of AOL UK was bought by Carphone Warehouse in October 2006 to take advantage of its 100,000 LLU customers, making Carphone Warehouse the largest LLU provider in the UK.

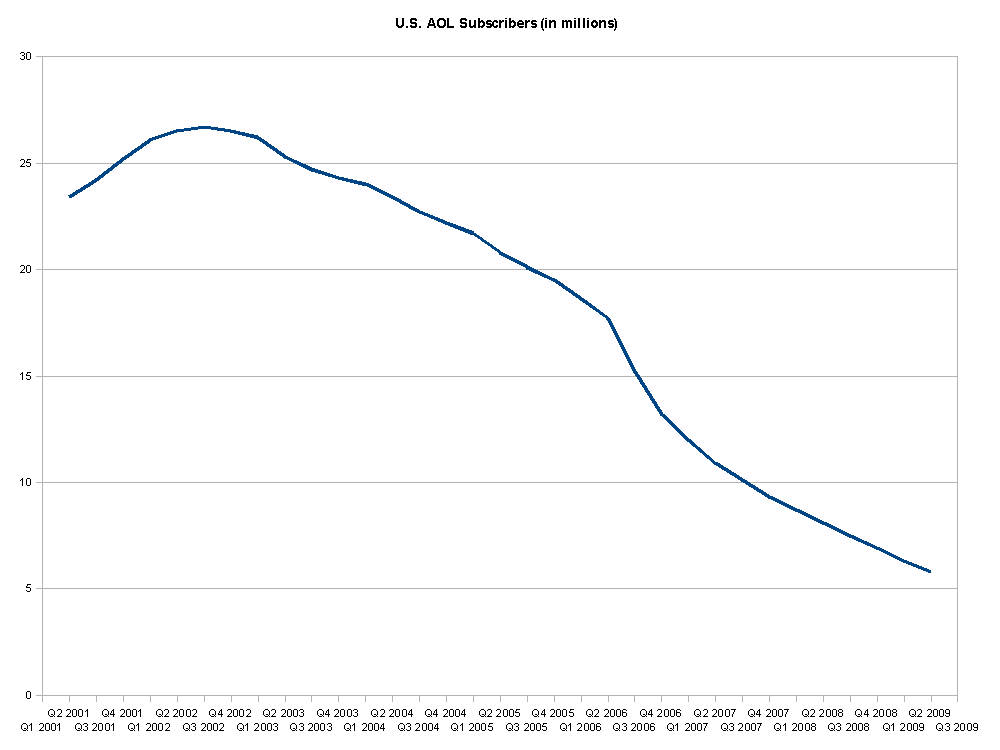
Decline in AOL US subscribers Q2 2001 – Q2 2009, with a significant drop from Q2 2006 onward

In August 2006, AOL announced that it would offer email accounts and software previously available only to its paying customers, provided that users accessed AOL or AOL.com through an access method not owned by AOL (otherwise known as "third party transit", "bring your own access" or "BYOA"). The move was designed to reduce costs associated with the "walled garden" business model by reducing usage of AOL-owned access points and shifting members with high-speed internet access from client-based usage to the more lucrative advertising provider AOL.com. The change from paid to free access was also designed to slow the rate at which members canceled their accounts and defected to Microsoft Hotmail, Yahoo! or other free email providers. The other free services included:

- AIM (AOL Instant Messenger)
- AOL Video, which featured professional content and allowed users to upload videos.
- AOL Local, comprising its CityGuide, Yellow Pages and Local Search services to help users find local information like restaurants, local events, and directory listings.
- AOL News
- AOL My eAddress, a custom domain name for email addresses. These email accounts could be accessed in a manner similar to those of other AOL and AIM email accounts.
- Xdrive, which allowed users to back up files over the Internet. It was acquired by AOL in August 2005, and shut down in December 2008. It offered a free 5 GB account (free online file storage) to anyone with an AOL screenname. Xdrive also provided remote backup services and 50 GB of storage for $9.95 per month.

Also in August, AOL informed its US customers of an increase in the price of its dial-up access to $25.90. The increase was part of an effort to migrate the service's remaining dial-up users to broadband, as the increased price was the same as that of its monthly DSL access. However, AOL subsequently began offering unlimited dial-up access for $9.95 a month.

In November 2006, Randy Falco succeeded Jonathan Miller as CEO. In December 2006, AOL closed its last remaining call center in the United States, "taking the America out of America Online," according to industry pundits. Service centers based in India and the Philippines continue to provide customer support and technical assistance to subscribers.

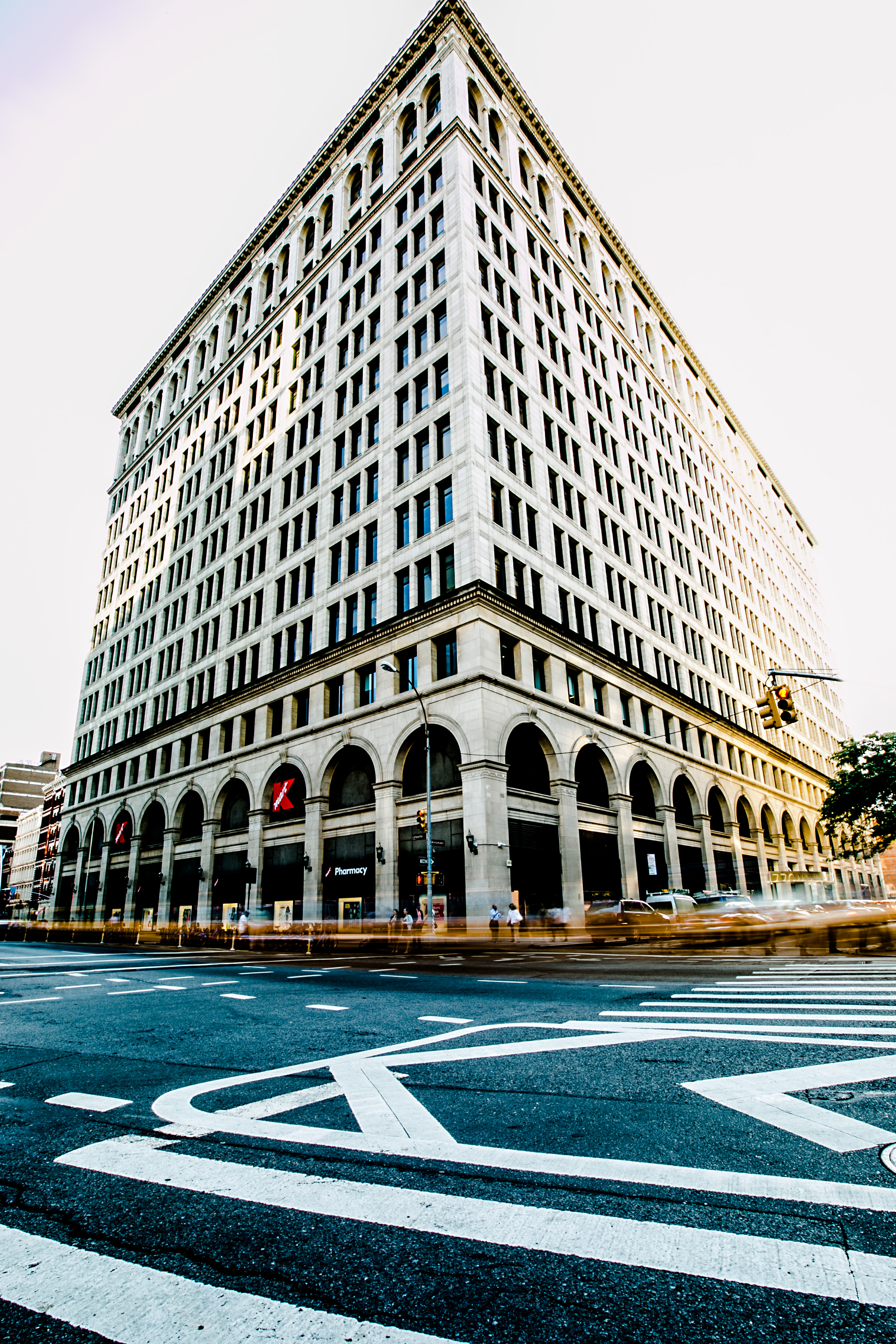
AOL headquarters at 770 Broadway in New York City

In September 2007, AOL announced the relocation of one of its corporate headquarters from Dulles, Virginia to New York City and the combination of its advertising units into a new subsidiary called Platform A. This action followed several advertising acquisitions, most notably Advertising.com, and highlighted the company's new focus on advertising-driven business models. AOL management stressed that "significant operations" would remain in Dulles, which included the company's access services and modem banks.

In October 2007, AOL announced the relocation of its other headquarters from Loudoun County, Virginia to New York City, while continuing to operate its Virginia offices. As part of the move to New York and the restructuring of responsibilities at the Dulles headquarters complex after the Reston move, Falco announced on October 15, 2007, plans to lay off 2,000 employees worldwide by the end of 2007, beginning "immediately". The result was a layoff of approximately 40% of AOL's employees. Most compensation packages associated with the October 2007 layoffs included a minimum of 120 days of severance pay, 60 of which were offered in lieu of the 60-day advance notice requirement by provisions of the 1988 federal WARN Act.

By November 2007, AOL's customer base had been reduced to 10.1 million subscribers, slightly more than the number of subscribers of Comcast and AT&T Yahoo!. According to Falco, as of December 2007, the conversion rate of accounts from paid access to free access was more than 80%.

In January 2008, AOL announced the closing of its Reston, Virginia, data center, which was sold to CRG West.

In February 2008, Time Warner CEO Jeff Bewkes announced that Time Warner would divide AOL's internet-access and advertising businesses, with the possibility of later selling the internet-access division.

In March 2008, AOL acquired Bebo for $850 million (£417 million).

In July 2008, AOL announced that it was shuttering Xdrive, AOL Pictures and BlueString to save on costs and focus on its core advertising business. AOL Pictures was closed on December 31.

In October 2008, AOL Hometown (a web-hosting service for the websites of AOL customers) and the AOL Journal blog hosting service were shut.

=== 2009–2015: As an independent digital media company ===
Former AOL logo, used from 2009 to 2024

In March 2009, Tim Armstrong, formerly with Google, was named chairman and CEO of AOL. On May 28, Time Warner announced that it would position AOL as an independent company after Google's shares ceased at the end of the fiscal year. On November 23, AOL unveiled a new brand identity with the wordmark "Aol." superimposed onto canvases created by commissioned artists. The new identity, designed by Wolff Olins, was integrated with all of AOL's services in December 2009, when AOL traded independently for the first time since the Time Warner merger on the New York Stock Exchange under the symbol AOL.

In June 2010, Bebo was sold to Criterion Capital Partners for an undisclosed amount, believed to be approximately $10 million. In December, AIM eliminated access to AOL chat rooms, noting a marked decline in usage.

Under Armstrong's leadership, AOL followed a new business direction marked by a series of acquisitions. It announced the acquisition of Patch Media, a network of community-specific news and information sites focused on towns and communities.

In September 2010, at the San Francisco TechCrunch Disrupt Conference, AOL signed an agreement to acquire TechCrunch. On December 12, 2010, AOL acquired about.me, a personal profile and identity platform, four days after the platform's public launch.

In January 2011, AOL announced the acquisition of European video distribution network goviral.

In March 2011, AOL acquired HuffPost for $315 million. Shortly after the acquisition was announced, HuffPost co-founder Arianna Huffington replaced AOL content chief David Eun, assuming the role of president and editor-in-chief of the AOL Huffington Post Media Group. Upon closing, AOL announced that it would cut approximately 900 workers.

In September 2011, AOL formed a strategic ad-selling partnership with two of its largest competitors, Yahoo and Microsoft. The three companies would begin selling inventory on each other's sites. The strategy was designed to help the companies compete with Google and advertising networks.

In February 2012, AOL partnered with PBS to launch MAKERS, a digital documentary series focusing on high-achieving women in industries perceived as male-dominated such as war, comedy, space, business, Hollywood and politics. Subjects for MAKERS episodes have included Oprah Winfrey, Hillary Clinton, Sheryl Sandberg, Martha Stewart, Indra Nooyi, Lena Dunham and Ellen DeGeneres.

In March 2012, AOL announced the acquisition of Hipster, a mobile photo-sharing app, for an undisclosed amount.

In April 2012, AOL announced a deal to sell 800 patents to Microsoft for $1.056 billion. The deal included a perpetual license for AOL to use the patents.

Also in April 2012, AOL took several steps to expand its ability to generate revenue through online video advertising. The company announced that it would offer gross rating point (GRP) guarantee for online video, mirroring the television-ratings system and guaranteeing audience delivery for online-video advertising campaigns bought across its properties. This announcement came just days before the Digital Content NewFront (DCNF) a two-week event held by AOL, Google, Hulu, Microsoft, Vevo and Yahoo to showcase the participating sites' digital video offerings. The DCNF was conducted in advance of the traditional television upfronts in the hope of diverting more advertising money into the digital space. In April 2012, the company launched the AOL On network, a single website for its video output.

In February 2013, AOL reported its fourth quarter revenue of $599.5 million, its first growth in quarterly revenue in eight years.

In August 2013, Armstrong announced that Patch Media would scale back or sell hundreds of its local news sites. Not long afterward, layoffs began, with up to 500 out of 1,100 positions initially impacted. On January 15, 2014, Patch Media was spun off, and majority ownership was held by Hale Global. By the end of 2014, AOL controlled 0.74% of the global advertising market, well behind industry leader Google's 31.4%.

On January 23, 2014, AOL acquired Gravity, a software startup that tracked users' online behavior and tailored ads and content based on their interests, for $83 million. The deal, which included approximately 40 Gravity employees and the company's personalization technology, was Armstrong's fourth-largest deal since taking command in 2009. Later that year, AOL acquired Vidible, a company that developed technology to help websites run video content from other publishers, and help video publishers sell their content to these websites. The deal, which was announced December 1, 2014, was reportedly worth roughly $50 million.

On July 16, 2014, AOL earned an Emmy nomination for the AOL original series The Future Starts Here in the News and Documentary category. This came days after AOL earned its first Primetime Emmy Award nomination and win for Park Bench with Steve Buscemi in the Outstanding Short Form Variety Series. Created and hosted by Tiffany Shlain, the series focused on humans' relationship with technology and featured episodes such as "The Future of Our Species", "Why We Love Robots" and "A Case for Optimism".

=== 2015–2021: As part of Verizon ===
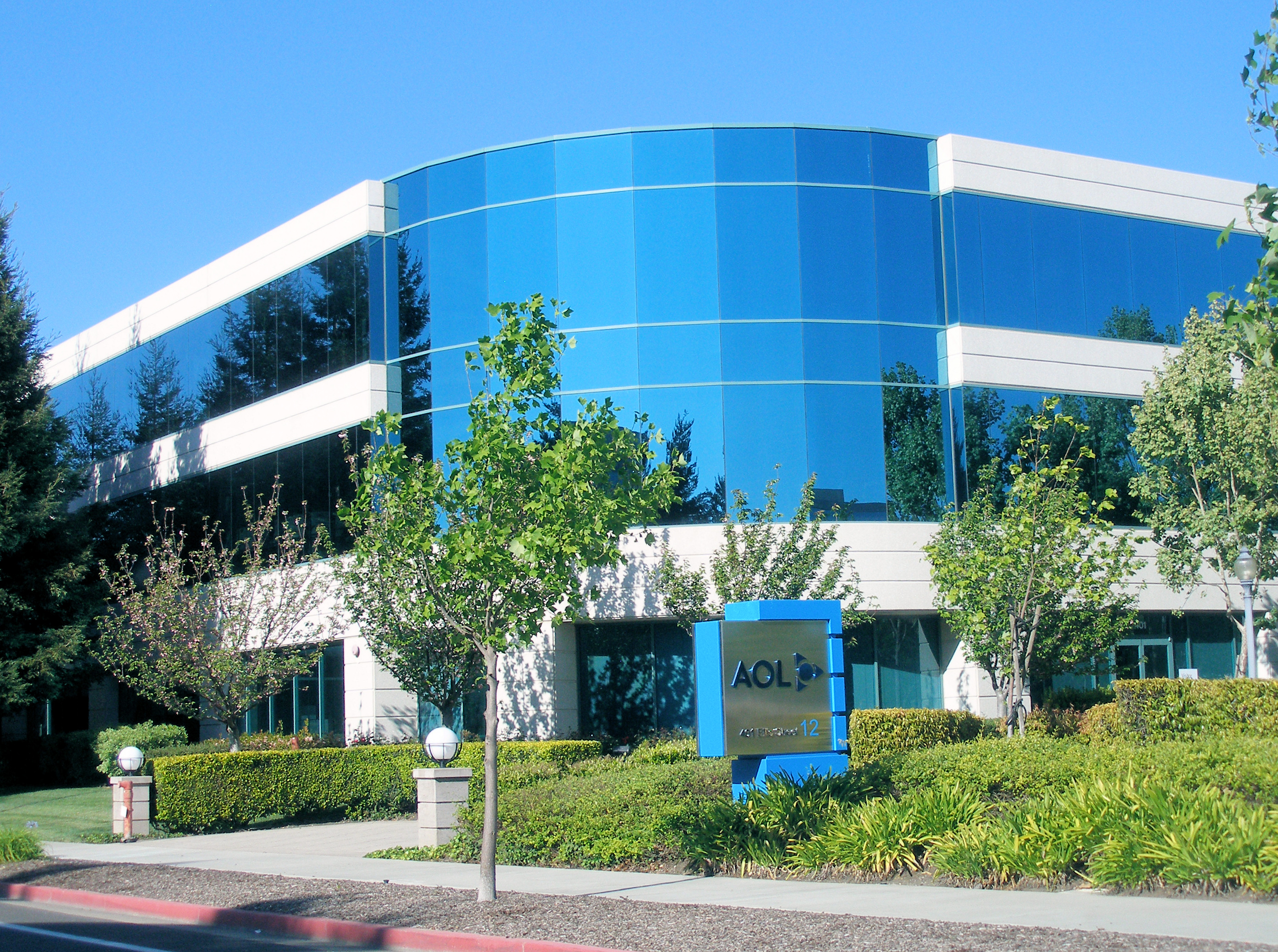
AOL's Silicon Valley branch office

In May 2015, Verizon announced plans to buy AOL for $50 per share in a deal valued at $4.4 billion. The transaction was completed on June 23. Armstrong, continued to lead the firm. The deal broadened Verizon's advertising sales platforms and increased its video production ability through websites such as HuffPost, TechCrunch, and Engadget. AOL had about two million dial-up subscribers at the time of the buyout.

In April 2015, AOL launched ONE by AOL, a digital marketing programmatic platform that unifies buying channels and audience management platforms to track and optimize campaigns over multiple screens. In September 2015, AOL expanded the product with ONE by AOL: Creative, which is geared towards creative and media agencies to similarly connect marketing and ad distribution efforts.

In June 2015, AOL announced a deal with Microsoft to take over the majority of its digital advertising business. Under the pact, as many as 1,200 Microsoft employees involved with the business will be transferred to AOL, and the company will take over the sale of display, video, and mobile ads on various Microsoft platforms in nine countries, including Brazil, Canada, the United States, and the United Kingdom. Additionally, Google Search will be replaced on AOL properties with Bing—which will display advertising sold by Microsoft. Both advertising deals are subject to affiliate marketing revenue sharing.

In July 2015, AOL received two News and Documentary Emmy nominations, one for MAKERS in the Outstanding Historical Programming category, and the other for True Trans With Laura Jane Grace, which documented the story of Laura Jane Grace, a transgender musician best known as the founder, lead singer, songwriter and guitarist of the punk rock band Against Me!, and her decision to come out publicly and overall transition experience.

In September 2015, AOL agreed to buy Millennial Media for $238 million. On October 23, 2015, AOL completed the acquisition.

In October 2015, Go90, a free ad-supported mobile video service aimed at young adult and teen viewers that Verizon owns and AOL oversees and operates, launched its content publicly after months of beta testing. The initial launch line-up included content from Comedy Central, HuffPost, Nerdist News, Univision News, Vice Media, ESPN and MTV.

In April 2016, AOL acquired virtual reality studio RYOT to bring immersive 360 degree video and VR content to HuffPost's global audience across desktop, mobile, and apps.

==== Merger into Oath ====
In July 2016, Verizon Communications announced its intent to purchase the core internet business of Yahoo!. Verizon merged AOL with Yahoo into a new company called "Oath Inc.", which in January 2019 rebranded itself as Verizon Media.

In April 2018, Oath Inc. sold Moviefone to MoviePass Parent Helios and Matheson Analytics.

In November 2020, HuffPost was sold to BuzzFeed in a stock deal.

=== 2021–2025: As part of Yahoo! ===
In May 2021, Verizon announced it would sell 90% of its Verizon Media division to Apollo Global Management for $5 billion, becoming the second independent incarnation of Yahoo Inc.

In 2025, AOL ended its dial-up internet service.

=== 2026: Acquisition by Bending Spoons ===
In January 2026, Bending Spoons acquired AOL in a deal valued at roughly $1.5 billion. In a statement, Bending Spoons CEO Luca Ferrari cited AOL's 30 million active users as part of what made the property attractive. The purchase was quietly completed in January 2026, Bending Spoons then laid off more than 100 AOL employees in February 2026.

== Products and services ==
=== Current products and services ===
==== Content and platforms ====
AOL's web ecosystem operates primarily as a content aggregator and digital service portal. The AOL homepage aggregates news, lifestyle, and entertainment content from major syndicated third-party media wires and partner networks.

In addition to mobile-optimized web experiences, AOL produces mobile applications for its remaining properties and standalone software utilities.

==== AOL Mail ====
AOL Mail is AOL's proprietary email client. It provides fully integrated webmail services and direct links to news headlines on AOL content sites.

==== AOL Plans ====
AOL Plans offers multiple online safety and assistance subscription bundles: identity theft protection, data security tools, and a general online technical assistance service.

==== AOL Desktop Gold ====
AOL Desktop Gold
- Other names: AOL Desktop
- Developer: AOL
- Release: December 8, 2007; 18 years ago
- Stable release: 11.0.3418 / November 11, 2021; 5 years ago
- Preview release: 11.1.5134 / July 28, 2026; 3 months ago
- Written in: C++
- Operating system: Windows 10, 11 Discontinued: Windows 7 (2024); Windows 8, 8.1 (2023); Windows XP, Vista (2019); OS X Mavericks, Yosemite, El Capitan, macOS Sierra, High Sierra (2017); OS X Snow Leopard, Mountain Lion (2016); OS X Lion (2015); OS X Leopard (2012); OS X Tiger (2010)
- Type: Internet Suite
- License: Proprietary
- Website: aol.com

In 2017, a paid internet suite version called AOL Desktop Gold was released, available for $4.99 per month after a trial period. It replaced the previous free software tier. On January 10, 2018, all versions of the original AOL Desktop were shut down so AOL could focus towards AOL Desktop Gold and AOL Shield. Following the shutdown of AIM, AOL's original legacy chat rooms continued to be accessible through AOL Desktop Gold until the chat system was permanently shut down in December 2020.

=== Former products and services ===
==== Divested media brands ====
When it owned HuffPost, AOL's content ecosystem featured contributors consisting of over 20,000 bloggers, including politicians, celebrities, academics, and policy experts, who contributed on a wide range of topics.

Several major media brands formerly owned by AOL—including Engadget, Autoblog, TechCrunch, and Built by Girls—became part of Verizon Media (now Yahoo) following Verizon's acquisition of AOL in 2015. Mobile applications and experimental products associated with these eras, such as Alto, Pip, and Vivv, have also been retired.

==== Advertising services and ONE by AOL ====
AOL previously operated a global portfolio of advertising technologies and services. This included data and programmatic solutions handled through its proprietary ad technology stack, ONE by AOL, which was built on acquisitions such as AdapTV (2013), Convertro (2014), Precision Demand (2014), and Vidible (2014). ONE by AOL operated under two separate banners: ONE by AOL for Publishers and ONE by AOL for Advertisers.

In September 2018, parent company Oath consolidated BrightRoll, One by AOL, and Yahoo Gemini into a unified ad-tech platform named Oath Ad Platforms, which was later rebranded as Yahoo! Ad Tech.

==== Dial-up Internet access ====
AOL originally built its user base on Dial-up Internet access. While the service retained 2.1 million subscribers in 2015, membership plummeted to a few thousand by 2021 as remaining premium users transitioned to software support packages. AOL officially discontinued its legacy dial-up service on September 30, 2025.

==== AOL Instant Messenger (AIM) ====
AOL Instant Messenger (AIM) was AOL's flagship proprietary instant-messaging tool launched in 1997. At its peak, billions of messages were sent daily across AIM and associated AOL chat properties. Over time, it lost significant market share to competitors like Google Chat, Facebook Messenger, and text messaging. It also included a integrated video-chat tool, AV by AIM. AOL discontinued the AIM service on December 15, 2017.

==== Legacy AOL Desktop and Toolbar ====
AOL Desktop was a freeware internet suite produced by AOL beginning in 2007 that integrated a web browser, a media player, and an instant messenger client. Early iterations (Version 10.X) were designed as an upgrade from AOL OpenRide, focusing heavily on email consolidation and localized system shortcuts without requiring users to log into an active AOL utility subscription.

Subsequent iterations shifted back to supporting the 9.X version lines. Version 9.8 replaced existing Internet Explorer engine dependencies with the CEF engine to mimic modern web-browsing frameworks like Google Chrome. Version 11 introduced a complete software architecture rewrite while preserving the 9.8 legacy layout. The freeware software stack was fully deprecated in 2017 in favor of the paid subscription iteration, AOL Desktop Gold.

Separately, the company maintained the AOL Toolbar, a web browser toolbar distributed as a Mozilla plug-in offering immediate web hooks into fundamental AOL platforms. The toolbar utility was maintained from 2007 until its retirement in 2018.

== Criticism ==
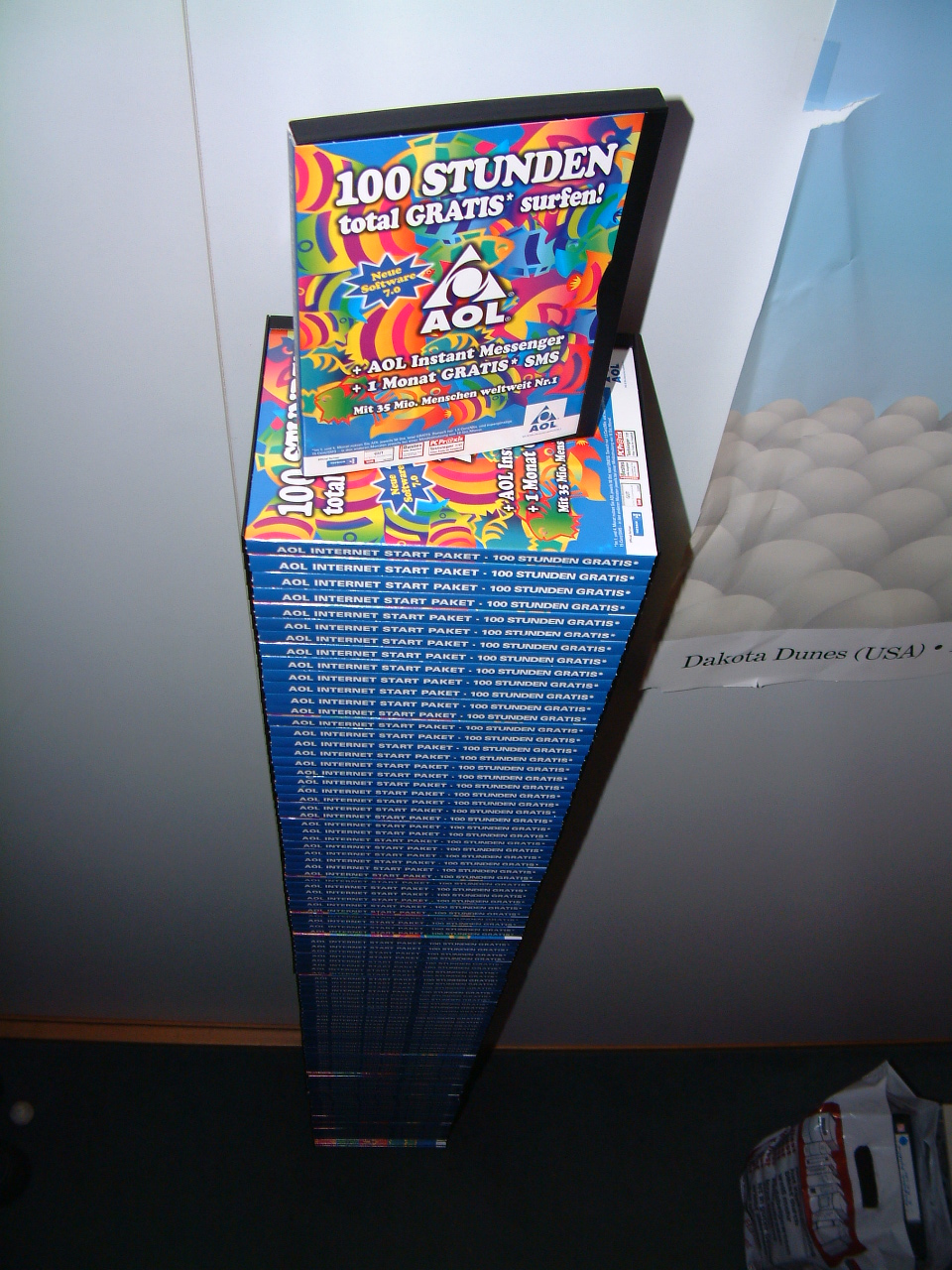
AOL CDs sent to a student dormitory at a University in Germany, 2002

In its earlier incarnation as a "walled garden" community and service provider, AOL received criticism for its community policies, terms of service, and customer service. Prior to 2006, AOL was known for its direct mailing of CD-ROMs and 3.5-inch floppy disks containing its software. The disks were distributed in large numbers; at one point, half of the CDs manufactured worldwide had AOL logos on them. The marketing tactic was criticized for its environmental cost, and AOL CDs were recognized as PC World's most annoying tech product.

=== Community leaders ===
AOL used a system of volunteers to moderate its chat rooms, forums and user communities. The program dated back to AOL's early days, when it charged by the hour for access and one of its highest billing services was chat. AOL provided free access to community leaders in exchange for moderating the chat rooms, and this effectively made chat very cheap to operate, and more lucrative than AOL's other services of the era. There were 33,000 community leaders in 1996. All community leaders received hours of training and underwent a probationary period. While most community leaders moderated chat rooms, some ran AOL communities and controlled their layout and design, with as much as 90% of AOL's content being created or overseen by community managers until 1996.

By 1996, ISPs were beginning to charge flat rates for unlimited access, which they could do at a profit because they only provided internet access. Even though AOL would lose money with such a pricing scheme, it was forced by market conditions to offer unlimited access in October 1996. In order to return to profitability, AOL rapidly shifted its focus from content creation to advertising, resulting in less of a need to carefully moderate every forum and chat room to keep users willing to pay by the minute to remain connected.

After unlimited access, AOL considered scrapping the program entirely, but continued it with a reduced number of community leaders, with scaled-back roles in creating content. Although community leaders continued to receive free access, after 1996 they were motivated more by the prestige of the position and the access to moderator tools and restricted areas within AOL. By 1999, there were over 15,000 volunteers in the program.

In May 1999, two former volunteers filed a class-action lawsuit alleging AOL violated the Fair Labor Standards Act by treating volunteers like employees. Volunteers had to apply for the position, commit to working for at least three to four hours a week, fill out timecards and sign a non-disclosure agreement. On July 22, AOL ended its youth corps, which consisted of 350 underage community leaders. At this time, the United States Department of Labor began an investigation into the program, but it came to no conclusions about AOL's practices.

AOL ended its community leader program in June 2005. The class action lawsuit dragged on for years, even after AOL ended the program and AOL declined as a major internet company. In 2010, AOL finally agreed to settle the lawsuit for $15 million. The community leader program was described as an example of co-production in a 2009 article in International Journal of Cultural Studies.

=== Billing disputes ===
AOL has faced a number of lawsuits over claims that it has been slow to stop billing customers after their accounts have been canceled, either by the company or the user. In addition, AOL changed its method of calculating used minutes in response to a class action lawsuit. Previously, AOL would add 15 seconds to the time a user was connected to the service and round up to the next whole minute (thus, a person who used the service for 12 minutes and 46 seconds would be charged for 14 minutes). AOL claimed this was to account for sign on/sign off time, but because this practice was not made known to its customers, the plaintiffs won (some also pointed out that signing on and off did not always take 15 seconds, especially when connecting via another ISP). AOL disclosed its connection-time calculation methods to all of its customers and credited them with extra free hours. In addition, the AOL software would notify the user of exactly how long they were connected and how many minutes they were being charged.

AOL was sued by the Ohio Attorney General in October 2003 for improper billing practices. The case was settled on June 8, 2005. AOL agreed to resolve any consumer complaints filed with the Ohio AG's office. In December 2006, AOL agreed to provide restitution to Florida consumers to settle the case filed against them by the Florida Attorney General.

=== Account cancellation ===
Many customers complained that AOL personnel ignored their demands to cancel service and stop billing. In response to approximately 300 consumer complaints, the New York Attorney General's office began an inquiry of AOL's customer service policies. The investigation revealed that the company had an elaborate scheme for rewarding employees who purported to retain or "save" subscribers who had called to cancel their Internet service. In many instances, such retention was done against subscribers' wishes, or without their consent. Under the scheme, customer service personnel received bonuses worth tens of thousands of dollars if they could successfully dissuade or "save" half of the people who called to cancel service. For several years, AOL had instituted minimum retention or "save" percentages, which consumer representatives were expected to meet. These bonuses, and the minimum "save" rates accompanying them, had the effect of employees not honoring cancellations, or otherwise making cancellation unduly difficult for consumers.

On August 24, 2005, America Online agreed to pay $1.25 million to the state of New York and reformed its customer service procedures. Under the agreement, AOL would no longer require its customer service representatives to meet a minimum quota for customer retention in order to receive a bonus. However the agreement only covered people in the state of New York.

On June 13, 2006, Vincent Ferrari documented his account cancellation phone call in a blog post, stating he had switched to broadband years earlier. In the recorded phone call, the AOL representative refused to cancel the account unless the 30-year-old Ferrari explained why AOL hours were still being recorded on it. Ferrari insisted that AOL software was not even installed on the computer. When Ferrari demanded that the account be canceled regardless, the AOL representative asked to speak with Ferrari's father, for whom the account had been set up. The conversation was aired on CNBC. When CNBC reporters tried to have an account on AOL cancelled, they were hung up on immediately and it ultimately took more than 45 minutes to cancel the account.

In July 2006, AOL's entire retention manual was released on the Internet. On August 3, 2006, Time Warner announced that the company would be dissolving AOL's retention centers due to its profits hinging on $1 billion in cost cuts. The company estimated that it would lose more than six million subscribers over the following year.

=== Direct marketing of disks ===
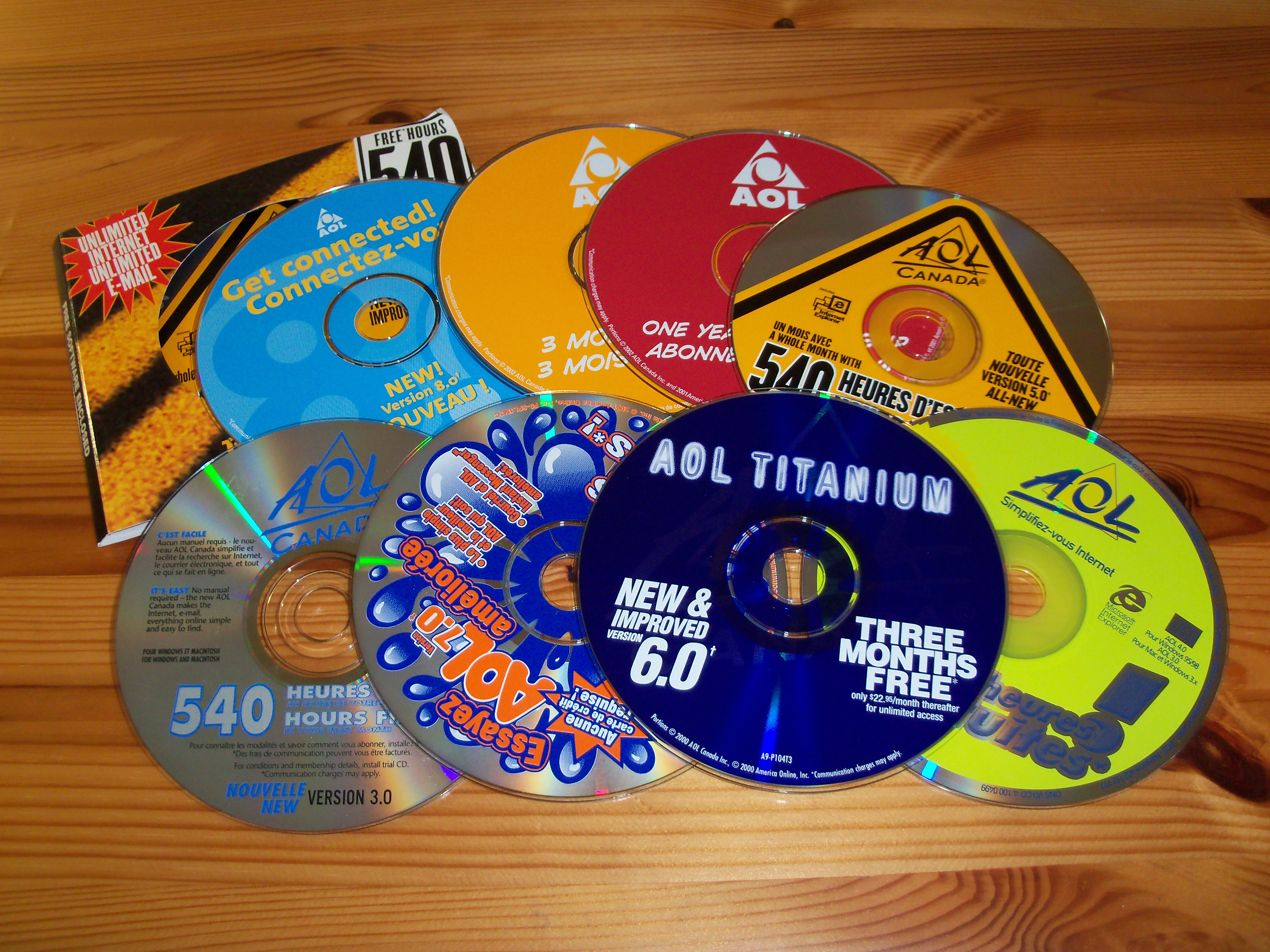
Some promotional CD-ROMs distributed in Canada

CD in original mailer

Prior to 2006, AOL often sent unsolicited mass direct mail of 3 1/2" floppy disks and CD-ROMs containing their software. They were the most frequent user of this marketing tactic, and received criticism for the environmental cost of the campaign. According to PC World, in the 1990s "you couldn't open a magazine (PC World included) or your mailbox without an AOL disk falling out of it".

The mass distribution of these disks was seen as wasteful by the public and led to protest groups. One such was No More AOL CDs, a web-based effort by two IT workers to collect one million disks with the intent to return the disks to AOL. The website was started in August 2001, and an estimated 410,176 CDs were collected by August 2007 when the project was shut down.

=== Software ===
In 2000, AOL was served with an $8 billion lawsuit alleging that its AOL 5.0 software caused significant difficulties for users attempting to use third-party Internet service providers. The lawsuit sought damages of up to $1000 for each user that had downloaded the software cited at the time of the lawsuit. AOL later agreed to a settlement of $15 million, without admission of wrongdoing. The AOL software then was given a feature called AOL Dialer, or AOL Connect on Mac OS X. This feature allowed users to connect to the ISP without running the full interface. This allowed users to use only the applications they wish to use, especially if they do not favor the AOL Browser.

AOL 9.0 was once identified by Stopbadware as being under investigation for installing additional software without disclosure, and modifying browser preferences, toolbars, and icons. However, as of the release of AOL 9.0 VR (Vista Ready) in January 2007, it was no longer considered badware due to changes AOL made in the software.

=== Usenet newsgroups ===
When AOL gave clients access to Usenet in 1993, they hid at least one newsgroup in standard list view: alt.aol-sucks. AOL did list the newsgroup in the alternative description view, but changed the description to "Flames and complaints about America Online". With AOL clients swarming Usenet newsgroups, the old, existing user base started to develop a strong distaste for both AOL and its clients, referring to the new state of affairs as Eternal September.

AOL discontinued access to Usenet in June 2005. No official details were provided as to the cause of decommissioning Usenet access, except providing users the suggestion to access Usenet services from a third-party, Google Groups. AOL then provided community-based message boards in lieu of Usenet.

=== Terms of Service (TOS) ===
AOL has a detailed set of guidelines and expectations for users, known as the Terms of Service (TOS, also known as Conditions of Service (COS) in the UK). It is separated into three different sections: Member Agreement, Community Guidelines and Privacy Policy. All three agreements are presented to users at time of registration and digital acceptance is achieved when they access the AOL service. During the period when volunteer chat room hosts and board monitors were used, chat room hosts were given a brief online training session and test on Terms of Service violations.

There have been many complaints over rules that govern an AOL user's conduct. Some users disagree with the TOS, citing the guidelines are too strict to follow coupled with the fact the TOS may change without users being made aware. A considerable cause for this was likely due to alleged censorship of user-generated content during the earlier years of growth for AOL.

=== Certified email ===
In early 2005, AOL stated its intention to implement a certified email system called Goodmail, which will allow companies to send email to users with whom they have pre-existing business relationships, with a visual indication that the email is from a trusted source and without the risk that the email messages might be blocked or stripped by spam filters.

This decision drew fire from MoveOn, which characterized the program as an "email tax", and the Electronic Frontier Foundation (EFF), which characterized it as a shakedown of non-profits. A website called Dearaol.com was launched, with an online petition and a blog that garnered hundreds of signatures from people and organizations expressing their opposition to AOL's use of Goodmail.

Esther Dyson defended the move in an editorial in The New York Times, saying "I hope Goodmail succeeds, and that it has lots of competition. I also think it and its competitors will eventually transform into services that more directly serve the interests of mail recipients. Instead of the fees going to Goodmail and AOL, they will also be shared with the individual recipients."

Tim Lee of the Technology Liberation Front posted an article that questioned the Electronic Frontier Foundation's adopting a confrontational posture when dealing with private companies. Lee's article cited a series of discussions on Declan McCullagh's Politechbot mailing list on this subject between the EFF's Danny O'Brien and antispammer Suresh Ramasubramanian, who has also compared the EFF's tactics in opposing Goodmail to tactics used by Republican political strategist Karl Rove. SpamAssassin developer Justin Mason posted some criticism of the EFF's and Moveon's "going overboard" in their opposition to the scheme.

The dearaol.com campaign lost momentum and disappeared, with the last post to the now defunct dearaol.com blog—"AOL starts the shakedown" being made on May 9, 2006.

Comcast, who also used the service, announced on its website that Goodmail had ceased operations and as of February 4, 2011, they no longer used the service.

=== Search data ===
In August 2006, AOL released a compressed text file on one of its websites containing 20 million search keywords for over 650,000 users over a three-month period between March 1 and May 31, 2006, intended for research purposes. AOL pulled the file from public access by August 7, but not before its wide distribution on the Internet by others. Derivative research, titled A Picture of Search, was published by authors Pass, Chowdhury and Torgeson for The First International Conference on Scalable Information Systems.

The data were used by websites such as AOLstalker for entertainment purposes, where users of AOLstalker are encouraged to judge AOL clients based on the humorousness of personal details revealed by search behavior.

=== User list exposure ===
In 2003, Jason Smathers, an AOL employee, was convicted of stealing America Online's 92 million screen names and selling them to a known spammer. Smathers pled guilty to conspiracy charges in 2005. Smathers pled guilty to violations of the US CAN-SPAM Act of 2003. He was sentenced in August 2005 to 15 months in prison; the sentencing judge also recommended Smathers be forced to pay $84,000 in restitution, triple the $28,000 that he sold the addresses for.

=== AOL's Computer Checkup "scareware" ===
In February 2012, a class action lawsuit was filed against Support.com, Inc. and partner AOL, Inc. The lawsuit alleged Support.com and AOL's Computer Checkup "scareware" (which uses software developed by Support.com) misrepresented that their software programs would identify and resolve a host of technical problems with computers, offered to perform a free "scan", which often found problems with users' computers. The companies then offered to sell software—for which AOL allegedly charged $4.99 a month and Support.com $29—to remedy those problems. Both AOL, Inc. and Support.com, Inc. settled on May 30, 2013, for $8.5 million. This included $25.00 to each valid class member and $100,000 each to Consumer Watchdog and the Electronic Frontier Foundation. Judge Jacqueline Scott Corley wrote: "Distributing a portion of the [funds] to Consumer Watchdog will meet the interests of the silent class members because the organization will use the funds to help protect consumers across the nation from being subject to the types of fraudulent and misleading conduct that is alleged here," and "EFF's mission includes a strong consumer protection component, especially in regards to online protection."

AOL continues to market Computer Checkup.

=== NSA PRISM program ===
Following media reports about PRISM, NSA's massive electronic surveillance program, in June 2013, several technology companies were identified as participants, including AOL. According to leaks of said program, AOL joined the PRISM program in 2011.

=== Hosting of user profiles changed, then discontinued ===
At one time, most AOL users had an online "profile" hosted by the AOL Hometown service. When AOL Hometown was discontinued, users had to create a new profile on Bebo. This was an unsuccessful attempt to create a social network that would compete with Facebook. When the value of Bebo decreased to a tiny fraction of the $850 million AOL paid for it, users were forced to recreate their profiles yet again, on a new service called AOL Lifestream.

AOL shut down Lifestream in February 2017, and gave users one month's notice to save photos and videos that had been uploaded. Following the shutdown, AOL no longer provides any option for hosting user profiles.

During the Hometown/Bebo/Lifestream era, another user's profile could be displayed by clicking the "Buddy Info" button in the AOL Desktop software. After the shutdown of Lifestream, this was no longer supported, but opened to the AIM home page (www.aim.com), which also became defunct, redirecting to AOL's home page.

== See also ==
- Adrian Lamo – Inside-AOL.com
- AOHell
- Comparison of webmail providers
- David Shing
- Dot-com bubble
- Elwood Edwards
- List of acquisitions by AOL
- List of S&P 400 companies
- Live365
- Truveo
