= FedBid =

FedBid, Inc. is now known as Unison Marketplace Inc. Unison Marketplace is a privately held company based in Vienna, Virginia, that operates a full-service online marketplace designed to optimize how federal, state and local governments, and educational institutions purchase simple goods and services such as IT products, office supplies and lab equipment, through a reverse auction-based platform.

== History ==
FedBid was founded in 1998, by Phil Fuster (CEO) and Luigi Canali (CTO) as a division of privately owned Procurement Technologies, Inc. of Gaithersburg, Maryland and initially raised more than $5 million in equity funding (Garage.com, Harvard Investment Group, Sun Capital Partners, and other equity funds) to launch the FedBid website. The idea came to Phil Fuster (a FedBid founder) when he became frustrated with the process of bidding on an RFQ. The company ceased operations in December 2000 when it could not secure a second round of financing. In 2001, the FedBid online marketplace reopened under the ownership of Advance Technology, Inc., which changed its name to FedBid, Inc. in 2004. The new FedBid expanded the focus of its online marketplace from U.S. federal orders to purchase order (PO) transactions for bigger purchases of commercial items, including commodity-type goods and simple services.

According to company officials, transaction volume through FedBid.com grew from $31 million in 2003 to $94 million in 2004, and $204 million in 2005. In 2007, FedBid was awarded a business method patent for its Auction Based Procurement System. In October 2009, FedBid announced that a record $875 million worth of purchases had been conducted through its site in FY2009, a 20% increase over FY2008. For FY2010, the company reported that $1.15 billion worth of purchases were conducted through its site in the prior fiscal year, a 30% increase over FY2009 and a 50% increase over FY2008.

In January 2012, FedBid won a major investment from the newly launched (December 2011) Revolution Growth Fund. Headed by Steve Case, Ted Leonsis and Donn Davis, Revolution Growth is now the largest investor in FedBid. As part of the agreement, Leonsis was named Vice Chairman of the Board of FedBid. The FedBid Board also includes General George Casey, the former Chief of Staff of the U.S. Army; Kim Cooke, Founder and Managing Director of Blue Water Capitol; Susan Bostrom, former CMO of Cisco; and Scott Hilleboe, also with Revolution Growth.

Originally created to respond to federal government purchasing needs, in 2013 FedBid expanded its reach to include state and local government, education institutions and commercial markets, with greater market expansion expected in as a result of the Revolution Growth investment.

On January 20, 2015, FedBid announced that Joseph Jordan has assumed the role of Chief Executive Officer, effective January 1, 2015.

On October 3, 2017, Compusearch announced the completion of the acquisition of reverse auction marketplace provider, FedBid, Inc. FedBid will continue to operate under its own brand.

On February 1, 2019, it was announced that Compusearch, owner of FedBid, has rebranded to the name Unison Software, Inc. Compusearch Software Systems is the leading provider of software and insight to government agencies, program offices, and contractors. The Unison brand encompasses all the brands formerly under Compusearch Software Systems, Inc., including Compusearch, PRISM, SpectrumCLM, FedBid, TopVue, FedConnect, and Virtual Acquisition Office (VAO). FedBid is now operating under the name Unison Marketplace with a new URL, however the Marketplace continues to offer the same functionality, customer service and account management it has since 2001. The new URL for FedBid is www.UnisonMarketplace.com.

== Operational model ==
Unison Marketplace, formerly FedBid offers a full-service, reverse auction marketplace where government and commercial Buyers (anyone in a position to purchase) post purchase requirements and then Sellers of those commodity products and services bid on those requirements.

Buyers save an average of 11% on purchases, which average $45,000. The company gets a small percentage fee on top of the contract price. If the transaction doesn't save the buyer money, they're not obligated to make the purchase.

While bidding, Sellers cannot see other bidders’ prices but can tell whether they have the leading (i.e. lowest) bid in the auction, and they can improve their bid if not. Buyers can select any or none of the bids offered, and they can cancel or repost the auction at any time. Buyers pay a performance-based transactional fee (fee is only paid if the Buyer awards the contract) that is automatically built into the bidding process. The winning Seller then remits the fee back to Unison Marketplace (formerly FedBid). The Marketplace is free for Sellers to use. This entire process is supported by a comprehensive suite of marketplace management services.

A study released by the Reverse Auction Research Center in December 2010 found that the reverse auction services provided by FedBid for the U.S. Customs and Border Protection bureau saved the agency roughly 10 percent annually over the past four years on more than $500 million in purchases made through the site. More than 90 percent of the acquisition professionals surveyed at the agency gave the reverse auction marketplace positive reviews, citing lower acquisition costs, greater competition, and a more streamlined buying process.

== Customers ==
FedBid's marketplace community includes over 90,000 sellers serving thousands of commercial, government, and education sectors. In October 2010, the U.S. Navy, U.S. Marshals Service and U.S. Department of the Interior all announced multi-year contracts to use the service. FedBid is now used by more than 16,000 buyers in all of the major federal agencies.

More than 8,500 government agencies shop using FedBid.

== Controversies ==
On January 29, 2015, the United States Air Force moved to have FedBid debarred for a time from future contracts with the federal government of the United States on the grounds that there was "adequate evidence" of a "lack of business honesty or integrity" at the company. At the time of these actions, FedBid already had been under investigation by the Office of the Inspector General of the United States Department of Veterans Affairs and the United States Department of Justice for some time.

On February 20, 2015, U.S. Air Force officials notified FedBid that they had removed the company from the Excluded Parties List System (EPLS) and the company was no longer suspended nor facing debarment proceedings. This decision was based on the terms of an administrative agreement signed between the company and USAF. While the administrative agreement was initially for a three-year period, on March 7, 2016, USAF deputy general counsel (contractor responsibility) Rodney A. Grandon notified FedBid that he had decided to end administrative agreement and monitoring requirements after only one year, stating "Given the excellent progress achieved by FedBid, I am satisfied there no longer exists a need for the AA (administrative agreement)."
