= AOL Hometown =

Former web hosting service

- Defunct: 31 October 2008; 18 years ago
- Owner: AOL (Verizon Media)

AOL Hometown was a web hosting service offered by AOL. It offered 12 megabytes of server space for AOL subscribers to publish their own websites, and included a 10-step form-driven page creator called 1-2-3 Publish and a WYSIWYG online website builder called Easy Designer, neither of which required knowledge of HTML (AOLpress had been AOL's website builder before the introduction of AOL Hometown). In 2001, AOL Hometown estimatedly had 11 million websites and a new website was added to it every eight seconds. By 2002, AOL Hometown had grown to 14 million websites. It was shut down on 31 October 2008.

Its shutdown led to the creation of Archive Team by Jason Scott who was angered by the shutdown. Then it, with the help of the Internet Archive and other activist websites, saved as much of GeoCities as possible when it became the next "critical part of online history" and "important outlet for personal expression on the Web" to be shut down with short notice in October 2009.

== History ==
=== members.aol.com ===
Before Hometown, AOL made 2 megabytes of webspace available for each user name, and had tools "Personal Publisher II" and "AOLPress". These webpages were then accessed in the members.aol.com or home.aol.com domains. Personal Publisher let users create webpages without knowing HTML; AOL discontinued Personal Publisher circa 2000. AOL members could also use the "MyPlace" keyword to upload HTML files they created themselves.

=== Hometown start date ===
The site initially launched as "Hometown AOL" in October, 1998. Within the first year, in 1999, the site was redesigned and rebranded as "AOL Hometown" to align the name with the rest of the AOL properties' names (AOL + property name).

Official online information as to when AOL Hometown started out is scarce. whois.pho.to gives a registration date of "before Aug-1996" for the domain of hometown.aol.co.uk, though that probably relates to the basic AOL domain itself as the "domain name" in the registration is given as "aol.co.uk". First mention of AOL Hometown in a Google Scholar publication dates from 2000, which is Quick Guide to You'Ve Got Pictures, Aol Exclusive Version by D. Peal. Prior to that, AOL Hometown was mentioned in a Deseret News article on September 30, 1999.

Two tools for AOL Hometown on the internet suggest a start date of 1999 or before. The copyright notice to the AOL Hometown StatCounter reads "Copyright 1999-2011". The imprint to the download page of James S. Huggins's AOL Hometown easyDesigner says that it was "created: before Thu, 01.Nov.2001", and its copyright notice reads "© 1997-2011"

=== Legacy sites ===
Over the time of its existence, AOL Hometown incorporated websites of formerly independent services acquired by or merged with AOL, including, but not limited to Ancestry.com, MyFamily.com, Netscape, CompuServe, eAccess AcmeCity and others.

Thus, it contained an unknown number of websites that had been online for longer than the existence of AOL Hometown itself. On the German forum antispam.de, one poster complained in 2008 that with the shutdown of AOL Hometown, AOL had deleted his website that had remained on the internet "for more than 17 years" (since at least 1991).

== See also ==
- GeoCities
- Tripod (web hosting)
- Wikia
