= AOL OpenRide =

- The icon showcases the 4 pane design

- AOL OpenRide
- Developer: AOL LLC
- Initial release: October 4, 2006; 19 years ago
- Final release: 1.5 / October 4, 2006; 19 years ago
- Operating system: Windows
- Type: Internet suite
- License: Proprietary
- Website: www.aol.com/openride (archived)

AOL OpenRide was an Internet application suite made by AOL from 2006, combining e-mail, instant-messaging, a web browser and a media player in one window. The suite was available for free download, but an AOL or AIM screenname was required to access some features.

== Layout ==
The main program interface was divided into four mini-windows, called panes:

- The People pane enabled users to sign into AOL Instant Messenger to display the user's buddy list and conversations.
- The E-mail pane was a standard email client. It was not restricted to just AOL email, but allowed users to add email accounts from other providers.
- The web browser pane ran AOL Explorer, which used the Trident rendering engine with extra features such as tabbed browsing.
- The media pane provided access to AOL's collection of videos, the Radio@AOL service, and featured a media player for files on the user's local hard drive.

== Termination ==
In late May 2007, having been available for less than six months, AOL removed AOL OpenRide from their official download page, but continued to support it on the help page.

In late July 2007, it was announced that AOL OpenRide would be replaced by "AOL Helix", subsequently renamed AOL Desktop, which incorporates most of AOL OpenRide's features, but not the Dynasizer, the multi-pane layout, or OpenRide's Media Center. From December 2007, users were no longer able to log into the AOL network with the OpenRide application to use Email/IM, and were instead logged out and referred to the AOL Desktop download page.
