= David Shing =

Australian marketing executive

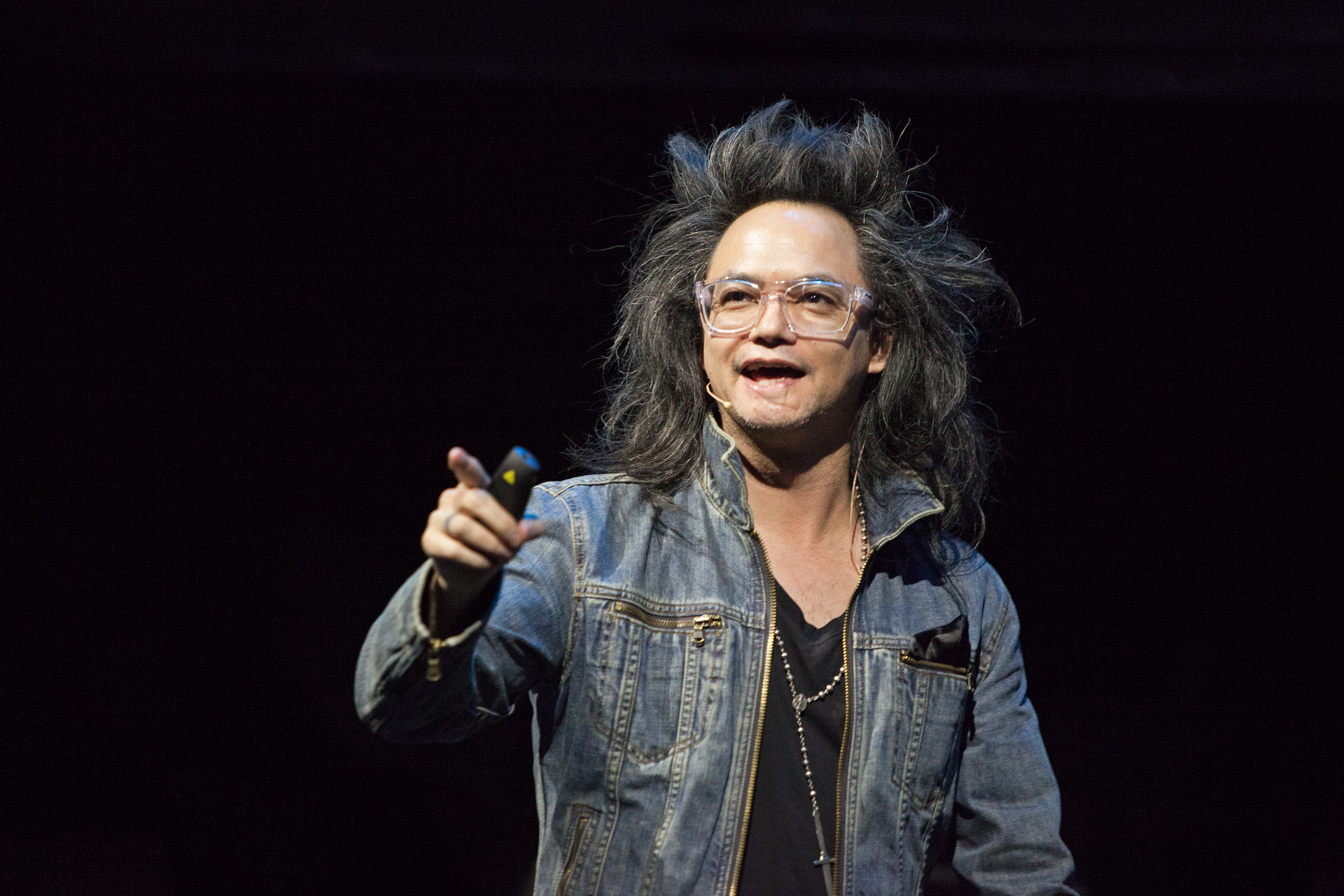
David Shing

David Shing (born 1970), also known as "Shingy", is an Australian marketing executive. He held various senior marketing positions at AOL between 2007 and 2019.

== Personal life ==
David Shing grew up in suburban Australia. He studied at Billy Blue design school in Sydney.

== Career ==
In 2007, Shing began a long relationship with AOL as the Marketing Director for AOL Europe. In 2010, he was promoted to VP Media and Marketing for AOL international. In 2011, he became the company's self-named "Digital Prophet". He was charged with promoting the company by speaking at conferences and events, including SXSW and TEDx. He stayed on at Oath and later Verizon Media after AOL's purchase by Verizon. He left in 2019.

== Public image ==
Shing has spoken at many live events, the coverage of which has focused on his unusual fashion sense, his idiosyncratic speaking style and his nebulous role within AOL (with The Guardian's Adam Gabbatt stating, for example, that the definition of a Digital Prophet "remains unclear"). His appearance on MSNBC and the follow-up article in The New Yorker made him the focal point for a conversation around the meaning behind buzzwords in the media industry. Some have gone so far as to describe his lectures as "pure gibberish," though they are defended as "less outlandish in context" by the advertisers he works with. Although he has been described as a symbol of AOL's "uncertainty and aimlessness" and even "everything that's wrong with corporate America," it has also been argued that the Digital Prophet moniker disguised a "fairly standard role" within the company.

== In popular culture ==
A character named "Shangy", transparently parodying Shing, appears in the comedy sketch show W/ Bob & David.
