= QuantumLink Serial =

The QuantumLink Serial is a work of episodic online fiction by the American writer Tracy Reed. It is considered the first such project ever.

The series ran from 1988 to 1989. It was also known as the PC-Link Serial and the AppleLink Serial before all three services were unified when Quantum changed its name to AOL. The QuantumLink Serial was included in the price of a monthly subscription to AOL.

The QuantumLink Serial was played out in online chat rooms, emails and traditional narrative. After each week's chapter was published on each of the three AOL online services (Commodore 64, IBM PC compatible, and Apple II/Mac), users wrote to author Reed suggesting how they could be part of the story. Each week Reed chose one of a handful of users on each of the three services and wrote them into the narrative, depicting how they interacted with the story through chat rooms, emails etc. Reed altered story lines to reflect the readers' input to the characters, as reflected in their unique custom-written "guest star appearances."

Reed began the story with a series of sample chapters, then pitched the project to AOL founder Steve Case and producer Kathi McHugh. Case bought the project immediately, and within three months The Serial was the highest-rated text segment of AOL (excluding chat rooms and message boards).

The story ran for one year, when the death of Reed's father led to a hiatus for the writer. Both Reed and AOL turned to other projects, and the series was not re-instituted.

The concept was brought back on line in 1995 when The Spot by Scott Zakarin debuted as an ad-supported site, adding photos and video to the original QuantumLink Serial model. It was highly successful and ran through 1997.
