= About.me =

Personal web hosting service

about.me
- Website type: Social directory
- Creators: Tony Conrad; Ryan Freitas; Tim Young
- Website: about.me
- Commercial: Yes
- Registration: Yes
- Current status: Active

about.me is a personal web hosting service co-founded by Ryan Freitas, Tony Conrad and Tim Young in October 2009. The site offers registered users a simple platform from which to link multiple online identities, relevant external sites, and popular social networking websites such as Facebook, Flickr, and Google+. AOL acquired the site in December 2010. The company remained at AOL for a little over twenty-five months.

On February 5, 2013, it was announced that Conrad had bought back majority control of About.me from AOL; although no specifics were revealed on the purchase price, Conrad did say that it was a fraction of the price AOL paid to originally buy it. Conrad believed that there were no advantages in being owned by AOL, and that the site did not fit with AOL's current business model (which has emphasized online content rather than social networking services). The site returned to becoming a startup, and began another funding round following the announcement.

On February 21, 2019, About.me was acquired by Broadly.
