= Revolution Money =

Revolution Money Inc.
- Type: Private
- Industry: Financial services
- Founded: April 2007
- Headquarters: St. Petersburg, Florida
- Key people: Jason J. Hogg Founder & CEO; Dax Cummings COO; Stephanie Fierman CMO; Nick Johns General Counsel; Darren Thompson CFO
- Products: Payment systems
- Parent: American Express
- Website: www.revolutionmoney.com

Revolution Money was a financial services company based in St. Petersburg, Florida. The company's products included a PIN based credit card, online person to person payments service, with a linked stored value card, and gift card. Revolution Money was created as the only credit card that did not charge retailers interchange fees. The company partnered with Yahoo! Sports and Fifth Third Bank.

Revolution Money had three products: RevolutionCard credit card, Revolution MoneyExchange which provides free online money transfers between members, and RevolutionGift, a gift card. Revolution MoneyExchange accounts were issued by First Bank and Trust.

== Background ==
Revolution MoneyExchange was an online bank intended as an alternative to PayPal and its chief competitor, Google Checkout. It was founded as GratisCard in April 2007. Ted Leonsis and Steve Case were on its board of directors. Revolution MoneyExchange was backed by Citi, Morgan Stanley, and Deutsche Bank AG, as well as its parent company, Revolution LLC.

There were no fees charged for online transfers between accounts. The Revolution MoneyExchange Card was a stored-value card that allowed account holders to access their funds for purchases at merchant locations on the RevolutionCard network and for cash withdrawals at ATMs nationwide.

RevolutionGift was a prepaid PIN based gift card with no account number printed on the card. Other features included the capacity to send money via AOL Instant Messenger.

On November 18, 2009, American Express announced that it would acquire Revolution Money for US$500 million, and finally did for US$300 million. Revolution MoneyExchange was purchased by American Express in January 2010, and was renamed Serve Virtual Enterprises, Inc. Serve Enterprises then launched Serve and discontinued Revolution MoneyExchange on March 28, 2011.
