= Quantum Link =

Defunct American technology company

Quantum Link (or Q-Link) was an American and Canadian online service for the Commodore 64 and 128 personal computers that operated starting November 5, 1985. It was operated by Quantum Computer Services of Vienna, Virginia, which later became America Online.

In October 1989 the service was renamed America Online, and made available to users of PC systems as well. The original Q-link service was terminated on November 1, 1994, in favor of the America Online brand.

The original Q-Link was a modified version of the PlayNET system, which Control Video Corporation licensed. Q-Link featured electronic mail, online chat (in its People Connection department), public domain file sharing libraries, online news, and instant messaging using On Line Messages (OLMs). Other noteworthy features included multiplayer games like checkers, chess, backgammon, hangman, and a clone of the television game show Wheel Of Fortune called Puzzler; and an interactive graphic resort island, called Habitat during beta-testing, then renamed Club Caribe.

In October 1986, QuantumLink expanded their services to include casino games such as bingo, slot machines, blackjack and poker in RabbitJack's Casino; and RockLink, a section about rock music. The software archives were also organized into hierarchical folders and expanded.

In November 1986, the service began offering to digitize users' photos to be included in their profiles, and started an online auction service.

Connections to Q-Link were typically made by dial-up modems with speeds from 300 to 2400 baud, with 1200 being the most common. The service was normally open weekday evenings and all day on weekends. Pricing was $9.95 per month, with additional fees of six cents per minute (later raised to eight) for so-called "plus" areas, including most of the aforementioned services. Users were given one free hour of "plus" usage per month. Hosts of forums and trivia games could also earn additional free "plus" time.

Q-Link competed with online services like CompuServe and The Source, and with bulletin board systems (single- and multiuser), including gaming systems such as Scepter of Goth and Swords of Chaos. Quantum Link's graphic display was better than many competing systems because they used specialized client software with a nonstandard protocol. However, this limited their market, because only the Commodore 64 and 128 could run the software necessary to access it.

== Club Caribe / Habitat ==
One of the most influential Quantum Link games was Club Caribe, a predecessor to today's MMOGs.

Club Caribe was developed with Lucasfilm Games using software that later formed the basis of Lucasfilm's Maniac Mansion story system (SCUMM). Users controlled on-screen avatars that could chat with other users, carry and use objects and money (called tokens), and travel around the island one screen at a time. Club Caribe allowed users to take the heads off their characters, carry them around, and even set it down. However, other users could pick up heads that were placed on the ground, resulting in headless players exploring the game world.

== Quantum Link Reloaded ==
In 2005, the proprietary server software was analyzed, and a version written in Java and reachable via TCP/IP was released at SWRAP 2005. The software evolved in two fork hosted on GitHub

== Popular culture ==
Much of the second and third seasons of the American TV series Halt and Catch Fire is centered around the development and troubles of the fictional tech startup Mutiny, heavily inspired by the story of PlayNET and Quantum Link in the 1980s. In the show, Mutiny transitions from an online games company to eventually delivering an online subscriber-based graphical chat community for Commodore 64 users, mirroring Habitat.

== See also ==
- Habitat
