= AOL Active Virus Shield =

Free anti virus service

- Developer: Kaspersky (Under license to AOL)
- Final release: 6.0.2.621 / May 30, 2007; 18 years ago
- Operating system: Windows
- Type: Antivirus
- License: Freeware
- Website: www.activevirusshield.com

AOL Active Virus Shield (commonly referred to as AVS) was a free antivirus utility made available by AOL. Its engine was based on the one used by Kaspersky Anti-Virus. The program is no longer available.

== Features ==
AOL Active Virus Shield was released free to the public. Active Virus Shield includes numerous features found in Kaspersky Anti-Virus. The software's main feature is malware scanning, which uses Kaspersky's underlying engine and detects a variety of malware such as viruses, spyware, and even joke programs. It also offers real-time file and e-mail scanning and protection.

The latest version of Active Virus Shield (version 6.0.2.621) supports Windows Vista.

== Advantages ==
Active Virus Shield is light compared to other commercial anti-virus products. It also does not consume much memory during startup. The program also benefits from Kaspersky's regular definition updates, typically around every two hours, which enable new viruses to be more effectively detected than programs that update less regularly. In addition, Active Virus Shield has better detection rates than other free programs such as AVG Free and avast! Home Edition.

== Criticisms ==
Active Virus Shield does lack some features of Kaspersky 6.0 (such as proactive protection and HTTP protection), and the license provided is only valid for one year, although the same email address as used initially can easily be used to renew it up to 10 times. It also does not support mail scanning when using TLS or SSL.

Some users have also reported compatibility problems with certain applications such as McAfee Personal Firewall Plus, ZoneAlarm and Logitech products.

== Current status ==
Active Virus Shield is no longer available for download as of August 1, 2007. It was replaced by McAfee Virus Scan Plus - Special edition from AOL, which is available for free for users with a free AOL account.

Even though Active Virus Shield is no longer available officially, the latest version of the program can still be obtained from the mirror server that it is hosted on. Help is also still offered for those already using the application.

== See also ==
- Antivirus software
- AOL
- Kaspersky Lab
