= Declan McCullagh =

American entrepreneur and journalist

Declan McCullagh is an American entrepreneur, journalist, and software engineer.

He is the CEO and co-founder, with computer scientist Celine Bursztein, of Recent Media Inc., a startup in Silicon Valley that has built a recommendation engine and iOS and Android news app. Recent, which uses artificial intelligence and machine learning for its recommendation engine, was released to early users in June 2015.

He previously worked for Wired, CNET, CBS Interactive, and Time Inc. His articles about technology have been published in Reason, Playboy, the Wall Street Journal, Communications of the ACM (co-authored with computer scientist Peter G. Neumann), and the Harvard Journal of Law & Public Policy.

Previously as a journalist he specialized in computer security and privacy. For many years, he moderated the Politech mailing list, giving commentary on the intersection of politics and technology. He is notable, among other things, for his early involvement with the media interpretation of U.S. presidential candidate Al Gore's statement that he "took the initiative in creating the Internet".

In addition to technology, McCullagh has written approvingly of free markets and individual liberty. He began writing weekly columns for CBS News entitled Other People's Money upon CBS Corporation's acquisition of CNET Networks. In August 2009, McCullagh renamed his column to Taking Liberties, which focuses on "individual rights and liberties, including both civil and economic liberties."
