= The Source (online service) =

Online service provider

- Native name: Source Telecomputing Corporation
- Type: Private
- Industry: Online Services
- Founded: 1978
- Founder: Bill von Meister
- Defunct: 1989
- Fate: Acquired by CompuServe
- Headquarters: 1616 Anderson Road, McLean, Virginia 22102.
- Area served: USA
- Parent: CompuServe

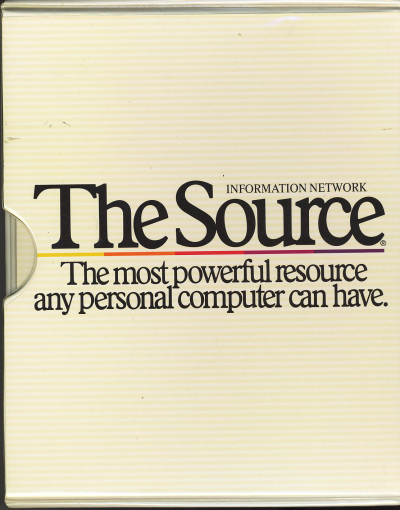
Originally, accounts on The Source were sold via retail packages which included manuals along with access information.

The Source (Source Telecomputing Corporation) was an early online service, one of the first such services to be oriented toward and available to the general public.

The Source was in operation from 1978 to 1989, when it was purchased by rival CompuServe and discontinued sometime thereafter. The Source's headquarters were located at 1616 Anderson Road, McLean, Virginia, 22102.

== History ==
The Source was founded in 1978 as Digital Broadcasting Corporation by Bill von Meister, with support from Jack R. Taub, a businessman who had been very successful publishing the Scott catalogue of postage stamps. Initially the idea was to transmit email using an unused subcarrier piggy-backed onto FM radio signals. Instead, the two hit on the idea of an "information utility," using cheap overnight excess capacity in minicomputers and data networks to make online information available to dial-up subscribers. Dialcom Inc., located in Silver Spring, MD was the backbone of The Source and supplied all of the networking, computing power and software development until the sale of The Source to The Reader's Digest Association. Robert Ryan was the president and CEO of Dialcom for fifteen years and concurrently served as the founding President of The Source and remained in that role for three years and then decided to return full-time to Dialcom. Having secured publishing rights and put in place the necessary software, the system was announced at Comdex in June 1979. At a launch in New York the following month, Isaac Asimov declared it to be "the start of the information age." Prices were initially US$100 for a subscription, then $2.75 per hour off-peak. However, the project had already run up large debts, and soon began running out of money. Taub sold an 80% controlling stake to The Reader's Digest Association to keep the company afloat. Von Meister initiated legal action, and received a $1 million pay-off. He went on to found Control Video Corporation, which ultimately evolved into AOL.

The Source operated TexNet as a specialized version of its service for the TI-99/4A home computers made by Texas Instruments.

Reader's Digest had high expectations for The Source, and established for the company its own purpose-built installation of Prime minicomputers in McLean, Virginia. However, subscriber numbers were slow to build, and (unlike the leaner set-up at rival CompuServe) this facility became an expensive and under-used overhead to maintain. Losses continued to mount, and chief executives came and went. Rumors abounded of an impending sale, but eventually Control Data Corporation put up $5 million in 1983 in return for stock options, and came in as an operating partner.

As the microcomputer boom continued, subscriptions reached a peak of 80,000 members, but later fell back (compared to 500,000 at CompuServe by 1989). During much of its existence The Source charged a start-up fee of about $100 and hourly usage rates on the order of $10 per hour. In 1984, the registration fee was $49.95, and The Source charged $20.75 per hour between 7:00 a.m. and 6:00 p.m. Monday through Friday, and $7.75 per hour on nights, weekends and holidays for 300 bits-per-second service. For service at 1200 bits per second there was a $5.00 per hour surcharge during weekday hours, and a $3.00 per hour surcharge at all other times. To place these costs for data services into an historical context, The Source's base nighttime and weekend rate of US$7.75 (equivalent to $24 in 2025) per hour in 1984 was approximately twice the federal minimum hourly wage in this same time period, placing the ability to access data with a personal computer in the hands of businesses and wealthy households only. Just as the expense of books gave rise to the library, the advent of data services provided by school and public library computers was a natural progression during this period in history.

The Source provided news sources, weather, stock quotations, a shopping service, electronic mail, a chat system, various databases, online text of magazines, and airline schedules. It also had a newsgroup-like facility known as PARTICIPATE (or PARTI), which was developed by Participation Systems of Winchester, Massachusetts. PARTICIPATE provided what it called "many to many" communications, or computer conferencing, and hosted "Electures" on The Source, such as Paul Levinson's "Space: Humanizing the Universe" in the spring of 1985.

Intended for use with 300 and 1200 baud dial-up telephone connections, The Source was text-based for most of its existence.
