= Frank J. Caufield =

American businessman (1939–2019)

Frank J. Caufield (1939 – November, 2019) was a co-founder and named partner of the venture capital firm Kleiner Perkins Caufield & Byers, based in Menlo Park, California.

From 1973 to 1978, Caufield was a general partner and manager of Oak Grove Ventures, a venture capital firm in Menlo Park, California. He was a past president of both the Western Association of Venture Capitalists and the National Venture Capital Association.

Caufield served on the boards of Quantum Corporation, Caremark Inc., AOL Inc., Megabios, VeriFone Inc., Wyse Technology, Quickturn Corporation and Time Warner. He was a director of The U.S. Russia Investment Fund, Refugees International, was a board member of the Council on Foreign Relations, an advisor to the European venture capital fund HealthCap and served as chairman of the Child Abuse Prevention Society of San Francisco.

Caufield graduated from the United States Military Academy in 1962 and completed an MBA from the Harvard Business School in 1968.
