= William von Meister =

American entrepreneur (1942–1995)

- Von Meister in 1989
- Born: February 21, 1942; New York City, U.S.
- Died: May 18, 1995 (aged 53); Great Falls, Virginia, U.S.
- Spouse: Leila Khairallah
- Children: Frederick von Meister, Katherine von Meister
- Parents: F.W. von Meister (father); Eleanora Colloredo-Mannsfeld (mother)

William F. von Meister (February 21, 1942 – May 18, 1995) was an American entrepreneur who founded and participated in a number of startup ventures in the Washington, D.C., area. These included The Source, an early online service and CompuServe competitor, and Control Video Corporation, a predecessor to AOL.

== Early years ==
William Ferdinand von Meister was born of noble German descent on February 21, 1942, in New York City, to F. W. von Meister and Eleanora Colloredo-Mannsfeld. His father, F. W. von Meister, was the godson of Kaiser Wilhelm II, and his mother was a countess.

Von Meister attended high school at Middlesex Academy in Massachusetts, and a finishing school in Switzerland. He then attended Georgetown University. Though he never completed his undergraduate education, he persuaded nearby American University to enroll him in its master's program for business.

== Career ==
After leaving Georgetown in 1973, von Meister started a wholesale liquor company, but found it "boring" and decided to move into consulting. After creating a database for Litton Bionetics, he was hired by Western Union to create a computerized billing system.

In 1978, von Meister founded The Source, the first popular online services company. The Source was eventually sold to Reader's Digest and later acquired by rivals CompuServe.

In 1982, von Meister was working on a project called the Home Music Store, which was to be beamed by way of the Westar IV communications satellite to cable television companies all over the United States, who would then provide it to their subscribers. For a monthly service charge of less than $10 (including rental of the necessary decoder box) plus a per-album fee (normally a little more than half the list price of the record), subscribers would be able to receive, decode, and record a digitally encoded and transmitted copy of the album. However, there is no evidence that the project ever came to fruition.

In 1983, Control Video Corporation, the predecessor of America Online, was founded by von Meister. The company originally ran the GameLine dial-up service for the Atari 2600, which Meister claimed to be able to handle up to 100,000 users.

== Personal life and death ==
Bill von Meister has four siblings, Peter, Nora, Rudy and Joseph. Von Meister died of cancer in Great Falls, Virginia, at the age of 53, leaving behind his children, Katherine Neysa and Frederick William von Meister.

== Titles ==
As a descendant of Prussian nobility, William was entitled to use the nobiliary particle von in his surname.

== Bibliography ==
- Klein, Alec (2004) [2003]. Stealing Time: Steve Case, Jerry Levin, and the Collapse of AOL Time Warner. New York: Simon & Schuster. ISBN 0-7432-5984-X.
- Swisher, Kara (1998). "Two: Billy's Beginnings". AOL.COM (How Steve Case Beat Bill Gates, Nailed the Netheads, and Made Millions in the War for the Web. ISBN 0-8129-2896-2.
- Needle, Davis (May 30, 1983). "CVC lets Atari VCS owners connect to GameLine". InfoWorld. pp. 8–9. ISSN 0199-6649.
