= Cyberdog =

Suite of computer applications for Internet use

- Developer: Apple Computer
- Release: beta, February 1996; 30 years ago
- Final release: 2.0 / April 28, 1997; 29 years ago
- Operating system: Classic Mac OS
- Type: Internet suite
- Website: www.cyberdog.org at the Wayback Machine (archived December 12, 1998)

Cyberdog is a discontinued OpenDoc-based Internet suite of applications, developed by Apple Computer for the Mac OS line of operating systems. It was introduced as a beta in February 1996 and abandoned in March 1997. The last version, Cyberdog 2.0, was released on April 28, 1997. It worked with later versions of System 7 as well as the Mac OS 8 and Mac OS 9 operating systems.

Cyberdog derived its name from a cartoon in The New Yorker captioned "On the Internet, nobody knows you're a dog."

== History ==
=== Cyberdog 1 ===
- Apple released the first beta version of Cyberdog on February 16, 1996.
- Apple released Cyberdog 1.0 on May 13, 1996.
- Apple released Cyberdog 1.2 on December 4, 1996.

=== Cyberdog 2 ===
Apple released a first alpha version on December 21, 1996, with new features such as frames, cookies and animated GIF support.

Apple also released Cyberdog 2.0 with Mac OS 8.0, allowing Mac Runtime for Java to be utilized and also had minor bugs with OpenDoc fixed.

== Overview ==
Cyberdog includes email and news readers, a web browser and address book management components, as well as drag and drop FTP. OpenDoc allows these components to be reused and embedded in other documents by the user. For instance, one of the common demonstrations of OpenDoc involved a "live" Cyberdog web page embedded in a presentation program.

A serious problem with the OpenDoc project that Cyberdog depended on, was that it was part of a very acrimonious competition between OpenDoc consortium members and Microsoft. The members of the OpenDoc alliance were all trying to obtain traction in a market rapidly being dominated by Microsoft Office and Internet Explorer. At the same time, Microsoft used the synergy between the OS and applications divisions of the company to make it effectively mandatory that developers adopt the competing Microsoft Object Linking and Embedding (OLE) technology. OpenDoc was forced to create an interoperability layer in order to allow developers to use it, and this added a great technical burden to the project.

An offspring of Cyberdog called Subwoofer was developed in parallel and was aimed at providing software developers with a simple library for integrating web communication protocols into applications. The project was completed after the cancellation of Cyberdog and released at the MacHack 1997 conference by Sari Harrison and Frédéric Artru. Subwoofer evolved into the URL Access library shipped with Mac OS 8.6.

== Cancellation ==
OpenDoc had several hundred developers signed up, but the timing was poor. Apple Computer was rapidly losing money at the time. Before long, OpenDoc was scrapped, with Steve Jobs noting that they "put a bullet through (CyberDog's) head", and most of the team was laid off in March 1997. Other sources noted that Microsoft hired away three ClarisWorks developers who were responsible for OpenDoc integration into ClarisWorks.

AppleShare IP Manager versions 5.0 through 6.2 rely on OpenDoc, but AppleShare IP 6.3, the first Mac OS 9 compatible version (released in 1999), eliminated the reliance on OpenDoc. Apple officially relinquished the last trademark on the name OpenDoc on June 11, 2005.

OpenDoc had a large memory footprint for the time, and since the OS/2 (Warp 4) versions of OpenDoc were behind schedule, Cyberdog was only released for Mac OS. Moreover, saved documents are not viewable from applications which do not support OpenDoc's Bento format. After Apple ended Cyberdog development along with the rest of OpenDoc, Cyberdog's web browser component has grown outdated as web standards evolved.

Cyberdog was once positioned as a replacement for the earlier, discontinued, Apple Open Collaboration Environment.

== See also ==
- Safari – Apple's current web browser
- Mail – Apple's current eMail client
- Finder (10.2+) – Apple later integrated FTP functionality into the Finder
- Address Book – Apple's system-level address book service
- Network Browser – An FTP client introduced in OS 9
- Claris Emailer – Apple's earlier eMail client
