= Byju's =

Indian multinational educational technology company

Think and Learn Private Limited
- Company Logo
- Trade name: Byju's
- Type: Private
- Industry: Edtech
- Founded: 2011; 15 years ago
- Founders: Byju Raveendran; Divya Gokulnath
- Defunct: October 2024
- Fate: Entered insolvency proceedings / valuation collapsed to 0
- Headquarters: Bangalore, Karnataka, India
- Area served: Worldwide
- Key people: Byju Raveendran (CEO); Divya Gokulnath (Director)
- Products: BYJU'S – The Learning App
- Revenue: ▲₹5,298 crore (US$570 million) (FY22)
- Net income: ▲₹−8,245 crore (US$−880 million) (FY22)
- Number of employees: 0 (2026)
- Subsidiaries: Osmo; TutorVista (Rebranded as iRobot Tutor TV STEM); HashLearn; WhiteHat Jr; LabInApp; Scholr; Aakash Institute; Toppr; Whodat; Tynker; Epic!; Great Learning; Superset; GradeUp (Rebranded as Byju's Exam Prep); GeoGebra
- Website: https://byjus.com/

Byju's (stylised as BYJU'S) was an Indian multinational educational technology company, headquartered in Bengaluru. It was founded in 2011 by Byju Raveendran and Divya Gokulnath. At its peak, it was the world's most valuable edtech startup, with a valuation of $22 billion in 2022. However, by October 2024, multiple media reports indicated that its valuation had effectively dropped to zero. As of April 2023, BYJU'S claimed to have over 150 million registered students.

In 2024, the company faced severe financial and operational challenges, which caused it to lay off approximately 500 employees, mainly from its sales and marketing departments.

As of 2025, the company is under insolvency proceedings in India.

Byju's owns GeoGebra.

== History ==
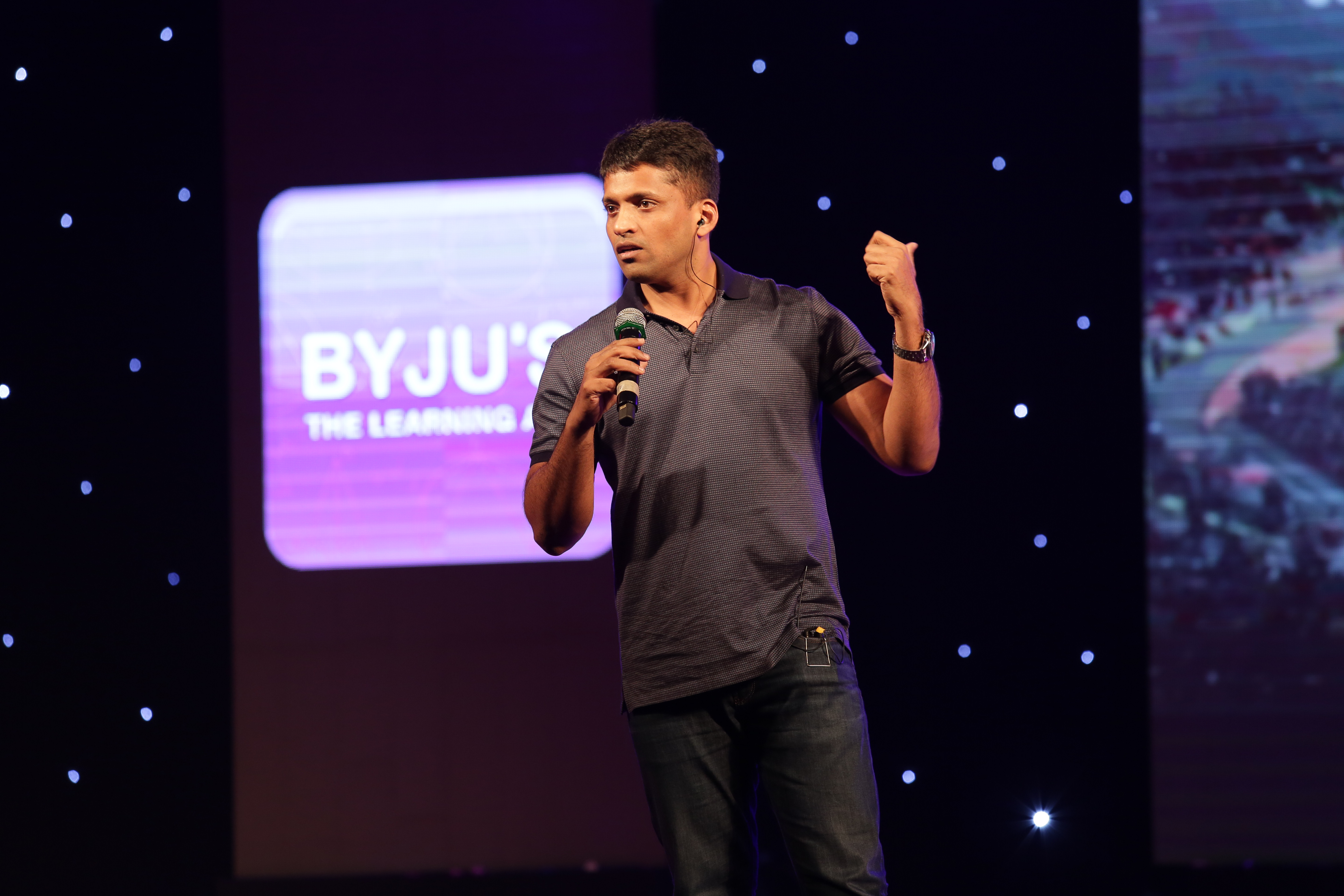
Byju's CEO Byju Raveendran

Byju's app was developed by Think and Learn Pvt. Ltd, a company which was established by Byju Raveendran, Divya Gokulnath and a group of students in 2011. Byju, an engineer by profession, was coaching students in mathematics since 2006. During the initial days, the company focused on offering online video-based learning programs for the K-12 segment and for competitive exams. In 2012, the firm entered Deloitte Technology Fast 50 India and Deloitte Technology Fast 500 Asia Pacific ratings and remained on those two rankings until its collapse.

In August 2015, the firm launched Byju's: The Learning App. In 2017, they launched Byju's Math App for kids and Byju's Parent Connect app. By 2018, it had 15 million users, 900,000 of which were paid users. In the same year, Byju's became India's first edtech unicorn. By 2019, 60% of Byju's students were from non-metros and rural cities.

In January 2022, the company joined Simplilearn, Unacademy, upGrad, PrepInsta Prime and Vedantu to become one of the founding members of IAMAI's India EdTech Consortium.

In March 2022, it signed a contract with Qatar Investment Authority to establish a new edtech company and an R&D centre in Doha.

In August 2022, Bloomberg News reported that India's Ministry of Corporate Affairs sent a letter to Byju's asking them to explain the non-filing of its audited financials for the year ending March 2021. Byju's reasoned that the 17-month delay was due to the challenge of consolidating the accounts of its acquisitions during that year. In spite of the delay, Deloitte gave the company a clean audit. In November 2022, many employees of Byju's came out to speak against the company's unfair treatment. Reportedly, Byju's fired over five thousand employees. In April 2023, the Enforcement Directorate announced that it had conducted searches at Byju's offices under the Foreign Exchange Management Act and seized "incriminating" documents.

In May 2025, the Byju's Android app was delisted from the Google Play Store due to unpaid AWS bills. The matter had been under mediation since April 2024.

In October 2024, Founder Byju Raveendran publicly stated, "the company is worth zero", referring to the valuation.

According to HSBC, Byju's was valued at $0 and Raveendran's net worth also dropped from US$2,100,000,000 to $0.

== Products and services ==
Byju's was an education tutoring app that ran on a freemium model, with free access to content limited for 15 days after the registration. It was launched in August 2015, offering educational content for students from classes 4 to 12. In 2019, an early learning program started for classes 1 to 3. It also trains students for examinations in India such as IIT-JEE, NEET, CAT, IAS, and international examinations such as GRE and GMAT.

Academic subjects and concepts are explained with 12–20 minute digital animation videos through which students learn in a self-paced mode. Byju's reports to have 40 million users overall, 3 million annual paid subscribers and an annual retention rate of about 85%. In October 2018, the app expanded to the United Kingdom, United States and other English-speaking countries.

In 2019, the company announced that it would launch its app in regional Indian languages. It also planned to launch an international version of the app for English-speaking students in other countries. And to cater students of kindergarten, Byju's launched new programs in its Early Learn App.

In April 2021, the company also announced the launch of "Byju's Future School" to be led by WhiteHat Jr Founder Karan Bajaj. The Future School aims to cross the bridge from passive to active learning with an interactive learning platform blended with coding and other subjects like Math, Science, English, Music and Fine arts through storytelling. Byju's planned to launch the Future School in the United States, United Kingdom, Australia, Brazil, Indonesia and Mexico in May of that year. Karan Bajaj quit WhiteHat Jr a year after the acquisition.

The company is focusing on adopting a hybrid model of teaching and learning by launching 500 tuition centers across 200 cities in India. As of February 2022, 80 centers are already launched.

== Acquisitions ==
In July 2017, Think and Learn acquired TutorVista (including Edurite) from Pearson.

In January 2019, Byju's acquired American-based Osmo, a maker of educational games for children aged 3–8 years for US$120 million.

In July 2020, Byju's also acquired Indian startup WhiteHat Jr for US$300 million.

In September 2020, Byju's acquires virtual labs simulation startup LabInApp.

In February 2021, Byju's acquires Mumbai-based doubt clearing platform Scholr.

In April 2021, Byju's acquired test prep firm Aakash Educational Services Ltd(AESL). in an estimated US$950 million cash and stock deal. Aakash's founders and Blackstone Group received minority stakes in Byju's as part of the deal.However, AESL is no longer owned by Byju's and functions independently post significant reduction in the stake of Byju's.

In July 2021, Byju's acquired American-based kids learning platform Epic! in a US$500 million cash-and-stock deal. The Epic acquisition was part of Byju's foray into the overseas market, from where it expects annual revenue of US$300 million per financial year.

In July 2021, Byju's acquired Singapore-based higher education platform Great Learning at a cost of US$600 million and after-school learning app Toppr.

In September 2021, Byju's acquired two startups including online test preparation platform Gradeup for an undisclosed price and rebranded it to BYJU’S Exam Prep and American based coding platform Tynker for US$200 million.

In December 2021, Byju's acquired GeoGebra in a US$100 million cash-and-stock deal.

In February 2022, Byju's-owned upskilling platform Great Learning acquires Bengaluru-based campus recruitment platform Superset.

To date, Byju's spent at least $2.8 billion on a dozen acquisitions to expand beyond the original learning app and bring together its services that will allow it to reach learners of all ages. For example, it has ventured into exam preparation, higher education MOOCs, and tuition centers. In addition, it has acquired several additional platforms that offer virtual reality, artificial intelligence, and educational gaming services, most of which occurred in 2021.

== Financials ==
Byju's received seed funding from Aarin Capital in 2013. As of 2019, Byju's had secured nearly $785 million in funding from investors, including Sequoia Capital India, Chan Zuckerberg Initiative (CZI), Tencent, Sofina, Lightspeed Venture Partners, Qatar Investment Authority, Verlinvest, IFC, Naspers Ventures, CPPIB and General Atlantic. Byju's was the first company in Asia to receive an investment from Chan-Zuckerberg Initiative (co-funded by Meta Platforms co founder, chairman and CEO Mark Zuckerberg and Priscilla Chan). As per the company filings with the Ministry of Corporate Affairs, Byju's became a unicorn and was valued at ₹6,505 crore ($1 billion) as of March 2018. In June 2020, Byju's attained the decacorn status with an investment by Mary Meeker's Bond Capital. In March 2022 Byju's raised $800 million, reaching a valuation of $22 billion.

In September 2020, Byju's replaced Oppo as the title sponsor of the India national cricket team. Byju's operates roughly on a premium business model where a paid subscription is required for most of the content. In 2017, Byju's generated revenues of about ₹260 crore (US$40 million or €33 million) and doubled it in 2018 financial year, earning ₹520 crore. In June 2020, with the investment of Bond, a global technology investment firm, Byju's was regarded as a decacorn with a US$10.5 billion valuation.

In November 2020, Byju's became the title sponsor of the Indian Super League club Kerala Blasters FC replacing Muthoot Group. In November 2020, Byju's raised US$200 million in a fresh funding round led by BlackRock and T. Rowe Price at a valuation of $12 billion. In March 2021, Byju's secured $460m in a series F funding round. In April 2021, B Capital, Baron Funds, and XN invested $1 billion in Byju's. In June 2021, Byju's raised $50 million in a Series F round from IIFL's private equity fund and Maitri Edtech. In October 2021, Byju's raised $296 million as a part of its Series F round from Oxshott Venture Fund, Edelweiss Group, Verition Fund Management, XN Exponent Holdings, and MarketX Ventures. In March 2022, the company raised $800 million from Byju Raveendran, Sumeru Ventures, Vitruvian Partners, and BlackRock. In March 2022, Byju's was named as one of the official sponsors of the 2022 FIFA World Cup.

In 2022 Byjus laid off nearly 4000 people from its team amid funding crunch and road to profitability.

Byju's was experiencing a severe funding crunch as of December 2023. The business was at odds with US lenders over unpaid interest on a $1.2 billion term loan. Byju's listed two important assets for sale in an effort to raise between $800 million and $1 billion to help with its financial difficulties.

Byju's laid off almost 4,000 employees in 2022 as a result of a lack of funding, hoping to shift toward profitability. In addition, the business is dealing with litigation and grievances regarding its products, services, and business practices from clients, employees, and competitors.

Byju Raveendran, the company's founder and group CEO, stated in November 2023 that the business will keep growing profitably and sustainably in the upcoming years.

On 25 January 2024, lenders began bankruptcy proceedings against Byju's in an effort to repay its loans. On 1 February 2024, Byju's U.S. division filed for Chapter 11 bankruptcy in Delaware. Byju's would raise around $200 million in an effort to clear "immediate liabilities" and for other operational costs at a post-money valuation of $225 million.

On 22 May 2024, a US bankruptcy court penalized Byju's director Riju Ravindran for contempt of court for refusing to disclose the location of $533 million in loan proceeds. The court also prohibited further transfers of these funds and found co-founders Byju Raveendran and Divya Gokulnath complicit. This decision followed a year-long legal battle between Byju's parent company, Think & Learn, and its bondholders.

On 1 August 2024, Byju's director Riju Ravindran was ordered by a US bankruptcy judge to pay $10,000 a day until he helped locate the $533 million the company was accused of hiding from its U.S. lenders.

In July 2024, the National Company Law Tribunal (NCLT) appointed an Insolvency Resolution Professional to oversee Byju's day-to-day affairs. This came after BCCI sought initiation of the insolvency proceedings against Byju's over unpaid dues of Rs.158 crore. The order was later quashed by NCLAT Chennai after the two parties agreed to a settlement.

On October 23, 2024, the Supreme Court of India set aside an NCLAT judgment that had closed insolvency proceedings against Byju's parent company, Think & Learn. The case was initiated by US-based creditor Glas Trust over a ₹158 crore debt. The Court ruled that proper procedures were not followed by NCLAT and directed that funds in escrow be moved to the Committee of Creditors.

Year	Revenue (In crores)	Profits/Loss (In crores)
FY 2018	▲490	▼ -29
FY 2019	▲1,376	▲ -8.82
FY 2020	▲2,381	▼-262.1
FY 2021	▼2,280	▼-4,558
FY 2022	▲5,298	▼-8,245

== Philanthropy ==
In September 2020, Byju's launched the “Education for All” Initiative for children from marginalised populations.

Among the several initiatives launched under Education for All, Byju's Give was launched in November 2020, under which the company collects old or unused smart devices for refurbishing purposes and then loads them up with Byju's content for free and distribute to those children who have no access to the internet.

== Sports sponsorships ==
In July 2019, Byju's won the sponsorship rights for the Indian cricket team jersey until 2023.

In November 2020, Byju's replaced the Muthoot Group to become the title sponsor of the Indian Super League club Kerala Blasters FC until 2024.

In March 2022, Byju's was announced as an official sponsor of the FIFA World Cup Qatar 2022.

== Criticism ==
=== Libel suits ===
Byju's was criticized for charging fees that only the rich can afford. Former salespeople say the company pushes its products on parents who cannot afford them. Byju's filed a ₹20 crore (200,000,000) defamation suit against critic Pradeep Poonia. They later withdrew the lawsuit.

=== Advertising and sales practices ===
Byju's subsidiary WhiteHat Jr. was asked to remove their five TV advertisements by the Advertising Standards Council of India (ASCI) due to misleading advertisements and hard sales tactics. WhiteHat Jr. claimed that a child named "Wolf Gupta" bagged job offers worth millions of rupees in multiple social media advertisements. This child was often described to be between the ages of 6 and 14 years. Investigations later revealed that this was all fabricated and Mr. "Gupta" is a work of fiction.

The company had filed a ₹20,000,000 (equivalent to ₹26 million or US$270,000 in 2026) defamation suit against Pradeep Poonia in November 2020, a software engineer, who alleged that the company made false claims and hired incompetent teachers. It was later withdrawn. It has also been the subject of a data leak, where the personal information of over 200,000 users was exposed.

Byju's offered a trial period with a 100% down payment refund. The company helped parents purchase expensive courses through easy loans from partner lenders. While Byju's receives the full fee upfront, parents must continue paying EMIs via direct debit, and the subscription is not canceled even if they are dissatisfied with the course or teachers.

The Department of Consumer Affairs voiced concerns on 24 June 2022, at India Edtech Consortium (IEC) meeting regarding aggressive sales practices and deceptive marketing strategies utilized by EdTech companies, particularly Byju's and the entities that make up its group. DCA advised Byju's to work closely with the ASCI based on the complaints against it. According to the reports, Byju's team has pledged to resolve these grievances with a detailed action plan.

=== Accounting practices ===
Previously, BYJU's used a different revenue recognition practice, which they had to change and obtain approval in accordance with Indian Accounting Standards (Ind-AS) 115 guidelines. For example, revenue expected in one fiscal year for a multi-year charge cannot be considered as revenue in that year alone. This discrepancy was eventually flagged by the auditor and a change was sought by the latter. As of September 2022, BYJU's began recognising streaming revenue across the term of usage, which was previously recognised fully upon the start of the contract. These new accounting standards have resulted in a reduction in the amount of income that Byju's is able to book in advance.

Also, in the past, BYJU's used its funding capital to acquire both domestic and overseas businesses and group them under its brand. And, lately investors voiced scepticism regarding this very plan to rapidly deploy capital in order to grow internationally.

=== Criminal allegations ===
In April 2023, Indian authorities conducted a raid on the Bengaluru office of the firm, suspecting violations of foreign exchange laws. In addition to denying any wrongdoing, the company assured its employees of full compliance with the laws. In May, the company faced a lawsuit from lenders in a US court, alleging defaults on payments and breaches of the loan agreement, including significant delays in releasing financial statements. Byju's denied the accusations of fund diversion through its US-based subsidiary, Alpha. In June, following the alleged non-payment of an interest installment of nearly $40 million, Byju's counter sued the lenders for harassment and initiated a new round of layoffs, resulting in the termination of around a thousand employees. The company faced further challenges as its auditors, Deloitte Haskins and Sells, resigned citing the delayed submission of financial statements, hindering their ability to assess the company's accounts. Subsequently, three board members resigned, leaving CEO Byju Raveendran, his wife Divya Gokulnath, and brother Riju Ravindran as the remaining members on the board.

In February 2024, India's economic intelligence and law enforcement entity Enforcement Directorate issued a look out notice against CEO Byju Raveendran.

== See also ==
- Course Hero
- Khan Academy
- Infinity Learn
- Vedantu
- Unacademy
- Physics Wallah
- Ruangguru
