= AppleLink Package =

- Filename extension: .pkg

The AppleLink Package Compression Format, or AppleLink Package for short, is an obsolete file format used on Apple Inc.'s defunct AppleLink online service as a file transfer and file compression format. It was not particularly efficient and was easily outperformed by contemporary systems like StuffIt and Compact Pro, and remained rare outside AppleLink.
