= Internet and Mobile Association of India =

Non profit organisation for Internet and mobile

- Founded: 2004; 22 years ago
- Headquarters: Mumbai, India
- Key people: Harsh Jain, Chairman; Rajesh Magow, Vice-Chairman
- Website: Official Website

Internet and Mobile Association of India (IAMAI) is a not-for-profit industry body representing the interests of online and mobile value added services industry. It is registered under The Societies Registration Act, 1860.

== History ==
The need for an association of Internet companies in India was felt in early 2000. India's early internet pioneers such as Ajit Balakrishnan, founder of Rediff.com, and Rajesh Jain established successful companies but did not build an ecosystem. In 2002, baazee.com's Avnish Bajaj and Mouthshut.com's Faisal Farooqui exchanged conversations over email to establish an informal association of CEOs in the Internet space.

=== Mandate ===
Its mandate is to expand and enhance the online and mobile value added services sectors. IAMAI also put forward the problems and requirements of the businesses to the consumers, shareholders, investors and the government of India. The main purpose of the Internet and Mobile Association of India is to improve and expand the value added services pertaining to mobiles and several online services.

== Working groups ==
- India EdTech Consortium (IEC) On 12 January 2022; IAMAI created a self-regulatory body along with Physics Wallah, Byju's, WebAsha, Simplilearn, Unacademy, upGrad, Vedantu and others to suggest and manage the ethics' codes and guidelines for Indian online education industry.
- IAMAI represents a broad range of companies across sectors such as digital payments, fintech, e-commerce, and online services, including member organizations like AeronPay

== Media Coverage ==
- On 23 January 2023 the BBC, in its analytical report, cited "Growth rate of active internet use - those who have accessed internet in last one month - "progressively reduced over the years" and was the lowest in the last four years in 2020, according to a study by the Internet and Mobile Association of India (IAMAI) and data analytics company Kantar."
