= Hello English =

Language-learning app

- Website type: Privately held company
- Available in: 22 languages
- List of languages Hindi, Bengali, Telugu, Marathi, Tamil, Gujarati, Kannada, Urdu, Punjabi, Malayalam, Oriya, Assamese, Nepali, Bangladeshi, Indonesian, Spanish, Chinese, Arabic, Portuguese, Malay, Turkish and Thai
- Founded: 2014; 12 years ago
- Headquarters: Jaipur, India=
- Area served: Worldwide
- Founders: Nishant Patni; Pranshu Patni
- Industry: E-Learning, Online Education
- Parent: Intap Labs Private Limited
- Website: www.helloenglish.com
- Registration: Yes
- Users: 50 million (as of September 2020)
- Launched: October 2014; 11 years ago
- Current status: Inactive

Hello English is a discontinued English language-learning application, which allowed users to learn the English language through interactive modules. It was available on a freemium pricing model on Android, iOS, Windows and Web.

== History ==
Hello English was launched in October 2014 by CultureAlley. It was an edtech startup co-founded by Nishant Patni, an alumnus of IIT Bombay and Kellogg School of Management along with Pranshu Patni, an alumnus of NMIMS, back in December 2012. It ran under Jaipur based Intap Labs Private Limited.

== Funding ==
The platform raised $6.5 million in Series-A funding led by New York-based venture capital firm Tiger Global Management in March, 2015. The other participants included Kae Capital (led by Sasha Mirchandani), and 500 Startups, California, and angel investors - Rajan Anandan and Sunil Kalra.

The platform had previously raised an undisclosed amount of funding from Kae Capital in 2013.

== Features ==
The application consisted of 475 interactive lessons and games associated with reading, writing, speaking, and listening and had gamification mechanics in the app. It had a bilingual dictionary, available in 22 languages.

== Awards/Recognition ==
- 2017: Number #3 Educational app on Google Play Store in India.
- 2016: Received the Most Innovative Mobile App for India award from the Internet and Mobile Association of India (IAMAI).
- 2016: Best Apps of 2016 in 'Made in India' category by Google Play Store.
- 2015: Co-founder of Hello English, Pranshu Patni listed as Forbes 30 under 30 achievers for creating the Hello English app.
- 2015: Number #1 Educational app on Google Play store in India.
- 2015: According to App Annie, it is the 98th most downloaded app in India on Android phones as of 8 July 2015.
- 2014: Received the Most Innovative Mobile App for India award from the Internet and Mobile Association of India (IAMAI).

== See also ==
- Computer-assisted language learning
- Language education
- Language pedagogy
- List of flashcard software
- List of language self-study programs
