= Unacademy =

Indian multinational educational technology company

Sorting Hat Technologies Private Limited
- Company Logo
- Trade name: unacademy
- Type: Private
- Industry: Edtech
- Founded: 2015; 11 years ago
- Founders: Gaurav Munjal; Hemesh Singh; Roman Saini
- Headquarters: Bangalore, Karnataka, India
- Area served: Worldwide
- Revenue: ▼₹988 crore (US$100 million) (FY24)
- Net income: ▼₹−628 crore (US$−65 million) (FY24)
- Subsidiaries: WiFiStudy; Kreatryx; CodeChef; PrepLadder; Mastree; Coursavy; TapChief; Rheo TV; Swiflearn; Relevel; Graphy; Chamomile Tea With Toppers
- Website: unacademy.com

Unacademy is an Indian educational technology company. The company is headquartered in Bengaluru. It provides an online educational platform that hosts online courses and exam preparation materials. The company was founded by Gaurav Munjal, Hemesh Singh and Roman Saini in 2015. As of May 2022, Unacademy was valued at US$3.44 billion.

== History ==
Unacademy started off as a YouTube channel created by Gaurav Munjal in 2015 when he was an engineering student in Mumbai. Gaurav uploaded a short video tutorial on computer graphics on his YouTube channel to help his peers prepare for the semester exams. In December 2015, Gaurav Munjal roped in two of his friends, Hemesh Singh and Roman Saini, and launched Unacademy app to create free interactive content.

In 2018, Unacademy acquired WiFiStudy for $10 million, a Jaipur-based online exam preparation and learning platform. In 2020, it acquired Kreatryx, an online preparation platform for GATE and ESE. That same year, Unacademy acquired CodeChef, an PrepLadder, a postgraduate medical entrance exam preparation platform, Mastree, and Coursavy, a Union Public Service Commission (UPSC) preparation platform. Unacademy shut down the operations at Mastree after a year of acquisition.

In 2019, Unacademy launched its subscription-based model, Unacademy Plus and reported an ARR of US$30 million. In the same year, Unacademy secured nearly $87 million from investors. It was the second company in India to receive a direct investment from Facebook.

In 2020, Unacademy launched Graphy, a platform that allows users to launch online schools.

During the COVID-19 pandemic in 2020, Unacademy opened its platform to schools and colleges to conduct live classes for their students. In the same year, the company launched its Legends on Unacademy, which includes live lectures from athletes, business executives and other public figures. Among the personalities who delivered live lectures are Brian Lara, Brett Lee, Jonty Rhodes, Virat Kohli, Sunil Gavaskar, Sourav Ganguly, former diplomat Shashi Tharoor, retired IPS Officer Kiran Bedi, Zev Siegl, Mary Kom, Randi Zuckerberg, Abhijit Banerjee, BCCI chief Sourav Ganguly, Wikipedia co-founder Jimmy Wales and Infosys Foundation chairperson Sudha Murthy.

In 2021, Unacademy acquired TapChief, Rheo TV and Swiflearn. In May 2021, Unacademy launched Educate India, an initiative supported by Feeding India, that provided free 1-year subscriptions to 10,000 children.

In December 2021, Unacademy had launched their Shikshodaya initiative that aims to educate over 5,00,000 girl students across India.

As of 2021, the company was valued at $ 3.44 billion and had raised $860 million in funding from investors.

In 2022, Unacademy became one of the founding members of IAMAI's India EdTech Consortium along with other edtech firms like Simplilearn, PrepInsta Prime, UpGrad, Byjus and Vedantu. That year, Unacademy opened its first offline learning centre in Kota, Rajasthan, followed up with other centers in Delhi, Mumbai, and Bengaluru.

Unacademy has signed MoUs with various Indian state governments to support meritorious students in these states to prepare for competitive exams like K-12, IIT-JEE, NEET UG, and Defence exams.

In March 2026, upGrad signed a term sheet to acquire Unacademy in an all-stock transaction. The proposed deal was structured as a 100% share swap, and Unacademy co-founder Gaurav Munjal was expected to continue leading the company after the acquisition.

== Criticism ==
In January 2020, Unacademy suffered a data leak by the hacker group ShinyHunters that led to the exposure of personal data of nearly 22 million users. The breach included user records of employees from Reliance Industries, TCS, HDFC, SBI, Infosys, Cognizant, Wipro, Accenture, Facebook and Google, among others. The records appeared for sale on a dark web forum, with the seller asking for $2000. Unacademy officials later confirmed that nearly 11 million accounts were compromised, but nothing valuable was leaked or misused. Unacademy re-assured the fact that no sensitive information has been compromised in their official statement on the issue.

In May 2021, it was criticized for posting questions in their Test Series that were religiously inclined and were claimed to be anti-national in nature. Learners complain that often their educators are removed from the system, leaving the syllabus mid-way. In 2022, Unacademy was under scrutiny for laying off both educators as well as full-time employees.

Unacademy suspended contracts of educators to cut cost due to funding winter in July 2022.

=== PrepLadder ===
In 2021, Sri Lankan company Medical Joyworks filed a suit in the Bombay Civil Court alleging that PrepLadder, a subsidiary of Unacademy, has plagiarized Medical Joyworks' Prognosis application and other property. The court in its order on 20 September 2021 stated that "Unacademy cannot use its PrepLadder app, website and any other content until all proprietary information, know-how, and technology belonging to Medical Joyworks have been removed to the satisfaction of Medical Joyworks and an independent auditor."

However, on 24 September 2021, the Bombay High Court stayed this judgement when the legal counsel appearing for PrepLadder alleged that the civil court's order was completely erroneous since the civil judge had passed it without jurisdiction.

=== 'Vote for educated' leaders controversy ===
On 17 August 2023 Unacademy fired Karan Sangwan, a teacher, after a video of him urging students to not vote for those who only focus on changing names, and to elect well-educated politicians, went viral on 14 August. Roman Saini, Unacademy cofounder defended his removal by pointing that classroom is not a place to share personal opinions and views. He further noted that platform was forced to terminate due to strict code of conduct policies of the company. Reacting, Delhi Chief Minister Arvind Kejriwal questioned if it is a crime to ask people to vote for educated people. Supriya Shrinate wrote: “Sad to see such spineless and weak people run an education platform.”

== See also ==
- Educational technology
- Infinity Learn
- Byju's
- Physics Wallah
- Online education in India
