= Claris Emailer =

Email client for the classic Mac OS

- Emailer screenshot showing mail browser window with folder list and message list pane. Also visible are the toolbar and the connection status window.
- Developer: Apple Computer
- Stable release: 2.0v3 / January 22, 1998; 28 years ago
- Operating system: classic Mac OS
- Type: E-mail client
- License: Freeware, Proprietary
- Website: www.fogcity.com - Fog City Software (Original developer)

Claris Emailer (often stylized as Claris Em@iler) is a discontinued e-mail client for the classic Mac OS created by Fog City Software. It was bought and marketed by the Apple Inc. subsidiary Claris. In addition to internet email, it supported sending and receiving email to online services such as AOL, Applelink, Compuserve. It was the only third-party e-mail client licensed to directly access AOL e-mail. Additionally, it was one of the first commercial applications to support the Internet Config preferences management system.

It had advanced e-mailing features for its time, such as automatic e-mail address completion, an intuitive address book, support for multiple signatures, and a scriptable interface. Many AppleScripts have been written that enhance Emailer and are available online. It was released both in a full and a lite version, and the latter was included for free in Mac OS 8.

It remained a Mac-only software title until it was eventually killed by Apple in the late 90s. The last version, 2.0v3, was released in 1998, and the software title is no longer supported by Apple. Emailer continues to work in the Classic Environment running under Mac OS X v10.4 Tiger. To date an Emailer-Talk mailing list is still active offering advice to keep the software functioning.

== Versions ==
- 1.1v3 – Last full Emailer 1.x version as released by Claris. When Em@iler 2.0 was delayed, Claris released the full version of 1.1 as freeware.
- 1.1v4 – An update to Emailer Lite to fix a bug in that version; otherwise identical to Emailer Lite 1.1v3. It was bundled with Mac OS 8 as well as being freely downloadable first from Claris, and later from Apple.
- 2.0 – Completely new version of Emailer released by Claris. Many more features, slightly different look. The major difference is that the 2.0 series has a single mail database for all e-mails, whereas the 1.x series stores the e-mails as individual files in folders in the Finder.
- 2.0v1 – Exact same version as 2.0. The v1 was retroactively added when the v2 patch was released... not known why the versions name are different as there were no advertised functionality or feature differences. 2.0 and 2.0v1 mean the same thing.
- 2.0/2.0v1 Demo – Same as 2.0, but freely downloadable from Apple. Installs a fully functional, time-limited version (depending on where you get the demo, the limit is between 30 days and 6 months... most copies are either 30, 60 or 90 days). It is believed the application file contains the expiration date, which means when the demo expires, it can be reinstalled; copying the new application file to the old install folder and a user can continue for another demo period. (the expiration date may be in the Mail Database, preventing a user from doing this). No update patches could be applied to this version, so users are stuck at 2.0v1 with the Demo version.
- 2.0v2 – Some new features and bug fixes added to 2.0. This is the last International version of Emailer. 2.0v2 is NOT Y2K compliant. There is an updater to go from 2.0v1 to 2.0v2.
- 2.0v3 – Some more new features and bug fixes added. This is the last US English version. It was quickly released after Apple pulled the plug on the Emailer project. (The project was cancelled along with all other non-FileMaker Claris products when Claris became FileMaker, Inc. It was certified the day before the company changed names.) The major functional difference in 2.0v3 is Y2K support was added. There is an updater to go to 2.0v3. The updater works on: 2.0v1 or 2.0v2. There is no need to install the v2 updater first, a user can jump right from 2.0v1 to 2.0v3. The updater will only work on US English versions of Emailer, but not on any International versions. International users are stuck at 2.0v2. A stand-alone installer of a full copy of 2.0v3 exists. Both versions were issued in multiple floppy disk form, as well as single-file installer.

=== Patches ===
Due to changes in ISP methods of authentication, three patched versions have been issued by members of the Emailer-Talk mailing list as follows:

- 2.0v3p1 – Reverses the POP/SMTP order of Emailer's full check. Emailer normally tries to send mail, and then check mail, the patch makes Emailer check mail and then send mail. This lets Emailer auto POP authenticate itself a little easier (no need to do a check twice in a row). This patch is based on the 2.0v3 US English PPC-only version of Emailer, and as such will only install on that version. It does not work with a 68k version of Emailer, or a FAT version of Emailer (68k and PPC). Exists as a Rescompare Patcher, or as a pre-patched copy.
- 2.0v3p2 – Adds multiple @ sign support to the Email Account field. This allows you to have an account username that is a full e-mail address (i.e.: myusername@mydomain.com@mail.mydomain.com). This patch is based on the 2.0v3 US English PPC-only version (same as above). It also includes the p1 patch. Patch and pre-patched versions exist.
- 2.0v3p3 – Adds limited SMTP Authentication support. It uses the same username and password that are used by the POP settings. There is no option to set it to use any other username/password combo, so it will only work for people who are sending e-mail through the same system they are collecting from. Patch is based on the 2.0v3 US English PPC-only version (same as above). It also includes the p1 and p2 patches. Patch and pre-patched versions of the application only exist.
