= Passwords (Apple) =

Password management software by Apple

- A screenshot of the Passwords app on iOS 26
- Developer: Apple Inc.
- Release: September 16, 2024; 2 years ago
- Operating system: iOS 18 onward; iPadOS 18 onward; macOS Sequoia onward; visionOS 2 onward
- Predecessor: Keychain
- Type: Password manager

Passwords is a password manager application developed by Apple Inc. available for devices running iOS 18, iPadOS 18, macOS Sequoia, and visionOS 2 or higher.

== Features ==
The app allows users to store and access encrypted account information saved to their iCloud Keychain or created via Sign in with Apple.

Passwords can also be accessed through the iCloud for Windows program.

Users can choose to manually enter new account details into the app, requiring a label or website name alongside the associated username and password.

Additional notes can also be attached to an account for further details; however, users are unable to add their own data fields. Accounts created through Sign in with Apple will be automatically registered into the app and will display their proxy e-mail address if iCloud's "Hide My Email" feature is used.

When entering a new account into the keychain, the app will also provide a strong password suggestion composed of random numbers and letters. All details are encrypted and stored on a user's iCloud account via Keychain, allowing Passwords to be synced and used across devices. AutoFill allows details stored in the app to be automatically entered into a website or application for quick and simple account login.

Alongside standard passwords, the program supports the use of passkeys and multi-factor authentication security codes and will provide users with security recommendations if their passwords are easily guessable or found in a data breach. Accounts can also be added to shared groups to grant access to friends and family.

Passwords will also store the details of any connected Wi-Fi networks and can generate a QR code that can be scanned to connect another device to the same network.

iOS 26, iPadOS 26 and macOS Tahoe added a password history feature to view previous passwords.

== History ==
Apple first developed their Keychain password management system as a component of their now-discontinued PowerTalk e-mail system.

The concept was eventually revived and directly integrated into the operating system with Mac OS 8.6, allowing for the secure storage of several types of sensitive data.

At WWDC 2013, Apple unveiled iCloud Keychain, which introduced the encrypted storage of account details over iCloud.

This allowed for logins to be synced across Mac devices and introduced other notable features including AutoFill and generating suggested passwords upon sign-up.

A simplified version of Keychain has also been included in iOS since its initial release, with password storage previously accessible only through the Settings app. Password AutoFill was first integrated into the operating system with the release of iOS 11, later being expanded into an API for third-party password managers.

The application was announced on June 10, 2024, by Craig Federighi at WWDC 2024, and shipped with iOS 18, iPadOS 18, macOS Sequoia and visionOS 2 on September 16, 2024.

== Security incidents ==
=== 2025 DOM-based Extension Clickjacking ===
Security researcher Marek Tóth presented a vulnerability in browser extensions of several password managers (including iCloud Passwords) at DEF CON 33 on August 9, 2025. In their default configurations, these extensions were shown to be exposed to a DOM-based extension clickjacking technique, allowing attackers to exfiltrate user data with just a single click. The affected password manager vendors were notified in April 2025. According to Tóth, Passwords version 3.1.27 remains vulnerable.

== See also ==
- List of password managers
