= Vedantu =

Indian Multinational Educational technology company

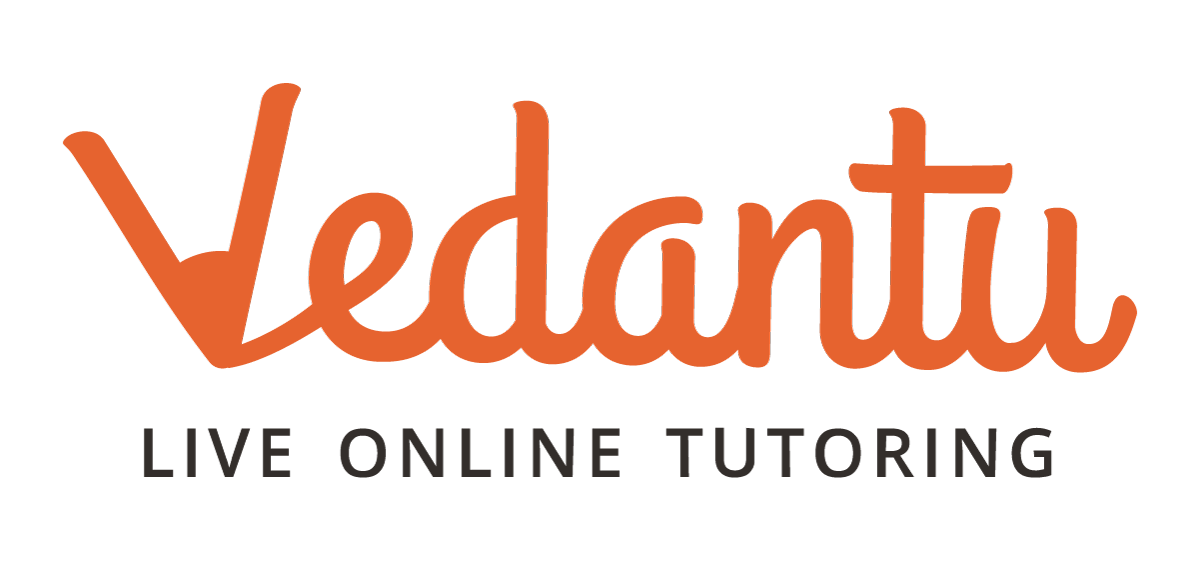
- Type: Private
- Industry: EduTech
- Founded: 2014; 12 years ago
- Founders: Vamsi Krishna (CEO & Co-Founder); Pulkit Jain (Products Head & Co-Founder); Anand Prakash (Academics Head & Co-Founder); Saurabh Saxena (Co-Founder)
- Headquarters: Bengaluru, Karnataka, India
- Area served: India
- Revenue: ▲₹270 crore (US$28 million)(2026)
- Website: vedantu.com

Vedantu is an Indian multinational online tutoring platform launched in 2014 based in Bengaluru, India. It primarily provides services to students in grades 4 to 12.

== History ==
The company was launched in 2014. Its name, Vedantu, is derived from the Sanskrit words Veda (knowledge) and Tantu (network). The organization is run by IIT alumni Vamsi Krishna (co-founder and CEO), Pulkit Jain (co-founder and head of product), Saurabh Saxena (co-founder) and Anand Prakash (co-founder and head of academics). Earlier, the team founded Lakshya, which was acquired by MT Educare (a subsidiary of Zee Learn) in 2012.

It primarily provides services to students from grades 4 to 12 of the Indian Certificate of Secondary Education (ICSE) and Central Board of Secondary Education. The company's primary business is live online tutoring in STEM, Hindi, English, Sanskrit, German, French, environmental science, and social science. It uses a White Board Audio Video Environment (WAVE) method for their 1-1 student-teacher live sessions. It provides test preparation courses for the Indian Institute of Technology Joint Entrance Examination (JEE) Foundation, National Talent Search Examination (NTSE), National Eligibility cum Entrance Test (NEET) and Problem Solving Assessment (PSA). Other courses include coding, mathematics, reading and public speaking.

In 2019, Vedantu suffered a data breach exposing the data of about 687,000 users, including email addresses, IP addresses, names, phone numbers, genders and passwords.

In January 2022, the company joined Byju's, Simplilearn, Unacademy, PrepInsta Prime and upGrad and became one of the founding members of IAMAI's India EdTech Consortium. In March 2022, it launched W.A.V.E 2.0, an interactive platform that aims to support Artificial Intelligence/Machine Learning.

Vedantu reported a net loss of ₹696 crore in financial year 2022.

In February 2024, Vedantu collaborated with TagHive to introduce new learning solutions.

== Funding ==
The firm raised its first round of funding after six months of the current operational format. In its series A funding, the firm raised US$5 million from Accel Partners and Tiger Global Management. It planned to utilize the funding to develop technology solutions for tablets and mobile with scalability, which can run hundreds of live learning sessions concurrently. Vedantu raised US$11 million in a series B funding round led by Silicon Valley impact investment firm Omidyar Network with additional investment from previous investor Accel Partners.

On 29 August 2019, Vedantu announced that it had raised US$42 million in a series C financing round for expansion in India.

In July 2020, Vedantu raised US$100 million in funding led by US-based Coatue. With the latest funding, Vedantu's total fund tally was over US$200 million. According to Fintrackr calculations, in September 2021, Vedantu raised US$100 million at a post-money valuation of over US$500 million.

In September 2021, the platform achieved unicorn status by raising $100 million in a Series E round led by ABC World Asia, valuing the company at $1 billion, making it the fifth edtech company in India to achieve unicorn status, following Byju's, Unacademy, Eruditus, and upGrad.

Due to reduced funding for Indian startups, Vedantu laid off one hundred employees in July 2022, making 720 redundancies for 2022. It further laid off 350 more people from its team in December 2022.

== Acquisitions ==
- In February 2021, Vedantu made its first acquisition by acquiring Instasolv in an undisclosed deal. Vedantu had invested US$2 million in Instasolv in July 2020.
- In July 2021, it invested in AI-enabled learning platform Pedagogy.

== See also ==
- Infinity Learn
- Unacademy
- Byju's
