= Connect Business Information Network =

Connect Business Information Network, formerly known as MacNET, was a proprietary dial-up online network with a graphic user interface similar to AppleLink.

== Launch ==
Mike Muller, a former VP of Apple Computer, launched MacNET in 1988. The mainframe end was programmed by Robert Lissner, the author of AppleWorks. The terminal software, also called MacNET, was sold through Macintosh software outlets and the network charged an hourly use fee.

== Growth and decline ==
In the early years, customers first had to purchase disk-based software as well as pay hourly online fees. There were two groups of customers: one was members of the general public, while the second was special interest or corporate customers who would see additional dedicated content not available to the general public. The general public could make use of email, a 15-minute delayed stock price server, public message base, and download libraries. During the first year of operation, growth was significant, as MacNET represented the first time that a graphic user interface (GUI) was widely available to customers who had previously been limited to the command line interface of CompuServe and GEnie. At launch, a forum titled Mac Symposium managed by Stuart Gitlow was launched using the freeware and shareware libraries of LaserBoard and BMUG as a starting point. When the PC software became available, T. Bradley Tanner launched a comparable forum, PC Symposium.

Use grew rapidly during the first years, but there was significant competition from America Online when that service launched one year after MacNET had launched on the Macintosh platform. While AOL had comparable hourly rates, they offered their software free off charge, distributing it widely both by direct mail and by user group and magazine distribution. Eventually, the MacNET service name and the company name were changed to CONNECT and the company began to focus on its special interest and corporate customers. Forum management, using Lissner's back end interface, was much simpler on CONNECT than it was using Rainman, the back end interface for AOL's forums, thereby keeping CONNECT viable for longer than it might have been otherwise.

The software remained MacNET on the Mac side and PCNet came out for the PC market. By the early 2000s, Connect became web-based and closed within several years of the widespread adoption of the WWW standard.
