= Byju Raveendran =

Indian entrepreneur (born 1980)

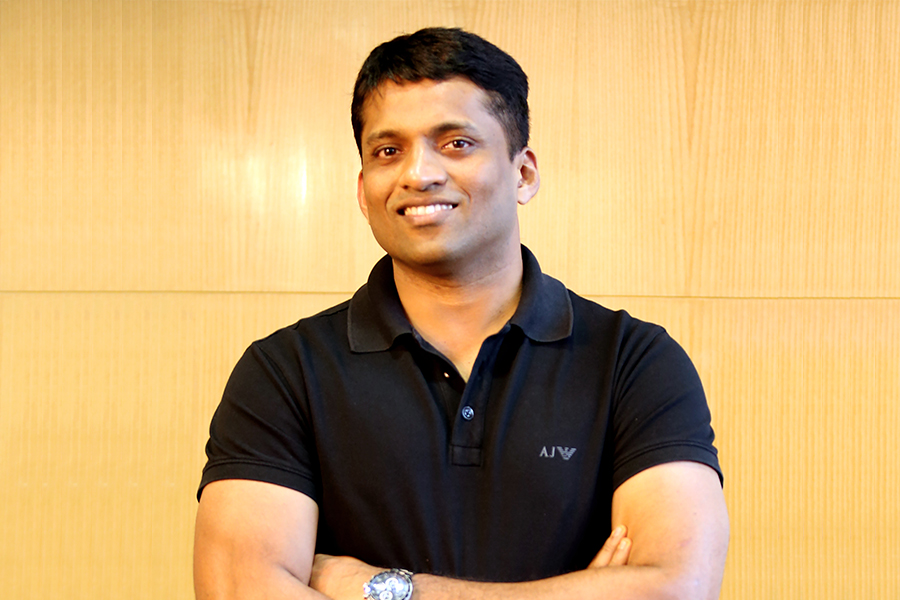
- Byju Raveendran in 2021
- Born: 5 January 1980 (age 46); Azhikode, Kannur, Kerala, India
- Citizenship: Indian
- Education: B-Tech
- Alma mater: Government College of Engineering, Kannur
- Occupation: Entrepreneur
- Known for: Co-founder Byju's, Founder Byju's Classes
- Title: Founder & CEO of Byju's
- Spouse: Divya Gokulnath
- Children: 3
- Parents: Ravindran (father); Shobhanavalli (mother)
- Awards: Member, National Startup Advisory Council (NSAC), Government of India (2021)

Byju Raveendran (born 5 January 1980) is an Indian entrepreneur, investor and educator who, with his wife Divya Gokulnath, co-founded Byju's which is headquartered in Bangalore. Raveendran is a Fortune 40 Under 40 recipient (2020), a Bloomberg 50 honoree (2020), and was named to India's National Startup Advisory Council by the Government of India in January 2021.

== Early life and education ==
Byju was born on 5 January 1980 in the Azhikode village of Kerala, India to Raveendran and Shobhanavalli. Both of his parents were teachers of physics and mathematics. During his primary and secondary education, he demonstrated a specific proficiency in mathematics. Biographical accounts often note this period as the foundation for his later focus on quantitative problem-solving and his subsequent career in pedagogy. He studied at a Malayalam medium school where his mother was a mathematics teacher and his father a physics teacher. He would skip most of his classes to go and play and then learn at home. During his upbringing in Azhikode, Kerala, Byju Raveendran showed an early preference for sports over formal schooling, often skipping classes to play—something his teachers tolerated and family supported. He was actively involved in six sports, including football and cricket. Raveendran has cited athletes such as Lionel Messi, Roger Federer, Brian Lara as key influences, noting that their discipline and commitment to excellence left a lasting impression on him. In interviews, he has linked this sporting influence to his approach to learning, suggesting that both are most effective when driven by genuine interest rather than fear of failure. His parents wanted him to be a doctor, but Raveendran chose engineering because of how little time medical students were left with to do anything else, and he knew he couldn’t not play sports.

== Career ==
After completing his B.Tech from the Government College of Engineering, Kannur, he joined a multinational shipping company as a service engineer. During a vacation in 2003, he helped his friends who were studying for the CAT exam. During a vacation, while helping friends with their preparation for the Common Admission Test (CAT), Raveendran was encouraged by them to take the exam himself. Despite a lack of formal study, his results were good. This drew considerable attention among students, leading many to seek his guidance for management entrance exam preparation, marking the beginning of his transition into teaching.

Raveendran also took CAT exam twice even after scoring 99 percent in the first attempt only to test whether his first attempt's result was a part of his brilliance or just a mere fluke and he ended up scoring 100 percentile and received calls from IIMs(Indian Institute of Management). However he didn't join the IIM as he didn't want to pursue MBA.

Byju Raveendran was invited by Harvard business school two times after their case study was published.

=== Foundation of BYJU’S ===
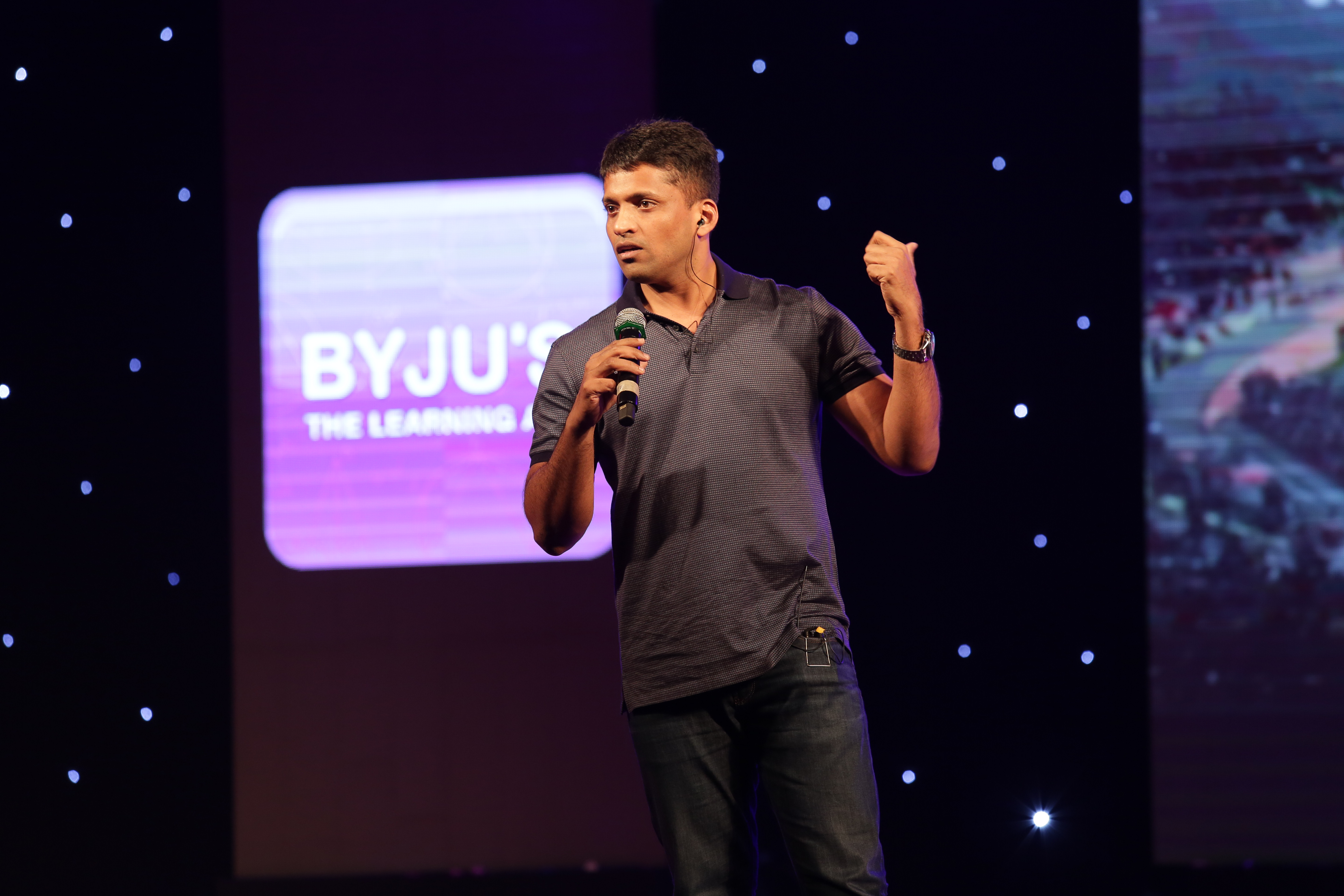
Byju Raveendran addressing an audience at an event in 2017.

In 2007, Byju founded the test preparation business Byju's Classes, and the company grew to stadium-size classes.

In 2011, Raveendran co-founded Think & Learn Pvt. Ltd., which serves as the parent entity for the educational platform BYJU'S. The company’s initial operations centered on the delivery of video-based preparatory modules for competitive examinations. Following this phase, the firm transitioned into the K-12 segment, integrating school-level curricula into its digital infrastructure.

In August 2015, Raveendran launched Byju's — The Learning App, a platform initially centered on video-based modules in mathematics and science for students in grades 4 through 12, as well as candidates for competitive examinations. The platform’s educational framework was structured around a concept-driven, self-paced pedagogy that incorporated adaptive assessment technology. This system functioned through a freemium-based subscription model, where foundational content was accessible at no cost while advanced features required a paid membership.

The enterprise experienced a significant increase in user acquisition during the COVID-19 pandemic, a period marked by nationwide school closures in India that facilitated a shift toward digital education platforms. Internal company reports indicated that the paid subscriber base more than doubled between 2020 and 2021. The company reported that its user base had grown to over 150 million registered individuals by 2022, spanning several global markets such as the United States, United Kingdom, Brazil, and Indonesia. During this period of global expansion, the company reached a peak valuation of approximately US$22 billion, becoming the most highly valued education technology firm in India at that time. By July 2022, the app had been downloaded more than 150 million times, and on average, its users spent 72 minutes on the app every day.

In 2016, Byju Raveendran through his startup Byjus (THink & Learn Pvt Ltd) became the only startup in India to receive funding from Mark Zuckerberg and his wife Priscilla chan's foundation Chan Zuckerberg Initiative.

In 2020, Byju Raveendran conducted Asia’s largest live class at Indraprashtha Stadium, New Delhi, attended by more than 25,000 students.

In 2021, Byju was heading advanced talks to acquire Vedantu for around $600-$700 million, but the deal didn't get through due to pending regulatory approvals.

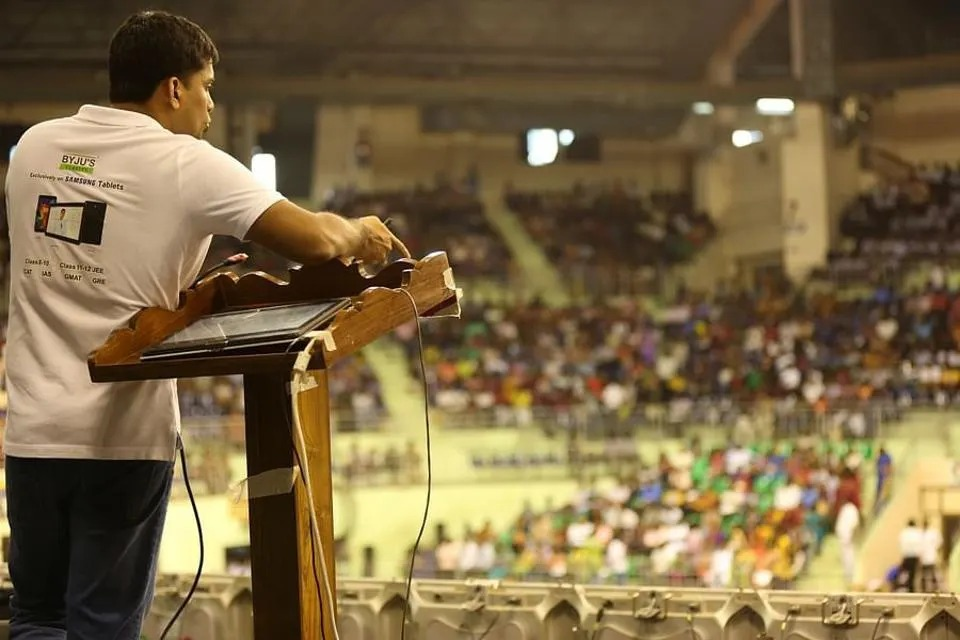
Byju Raveendran taking Asia's biggest live class at Indraprashtha Stadium, New Delhi in 2020

According to Forbes, as of 2020, Byju, his wife Divya Gokulnath, and his brother Riju Raveendran have a combined net worth of $3.4 billion. But now, Byju Raveendran’s net worth is estimated at zero, down from a peak of $2.1 billion (approximately ₹17,545 crore). In January 2021, he was added to the National Startup Advisory Council as a non-official member. In April 2021, Byju's purchased the Indian test-prep provider Aakash Educational Services Ltd. for nearly US$1 billion.

In 2022, as a part of Byju Raveendran's company Byju's $800Million funding round, Byju Raveendran(CEO & co-founder) invested $400Million from his personal savings and assets into the company and increased his equity to 25%. Global investment firms like Blackrock, Sumeru Ventures, Vitruvian Partners also invested in this round.

Between 2013 and 2023, Byju Raveendran through his company bought a Foreign Direct Investment (FDI) of Rs 28000 Cr which is the highest FDI inflow by an indian startup.

On 1 February 2024, multiple shareholders were reported to have signed a notice calling for a general meeting to address various issues at BYJU'S, including requests to change the company's board of directors and leadership. In February 2024, India's economic intelligence and law enforcement entity Enforcement Directorate issued a look out notice against Raveendran. On 23 February, shareholders voted to remove Byju as CEO, and he stated afterwards that the vote was invalid due to a lack of a quorum. A previous court ruling placed the implementation of the shareholder vote on hold until after further review on 13 March 2024.

Under Raveendran's leadership as chief executive, BYJU'S carried out a series of acquisitions between 2019 and 2021 to expand its product portfolio and international reach.

In 2025, Raveendran has launched Byju's 3.0 with its expansion in all Indian States again. Under Byju’s 3.0, teachers use AI-driven tools to enhance and improve their teaching methods.

=== NSAC ===
Government of India through its ministry of commerce and industries and Department for promotion of industry & internal trade (DPIIT) setup a National Startup Advisory Council (NSAC) on 21st January, 2020 and nominated Byju Raveendran as its member. Raveendran along with the council was given the task to nurture innovation and promote startups & create employment in India. This council was chaired by the Union Minister Of Commerce & Industries.

== Philanthropy ==
In September 2020, Raveendran with his wife Divya Gokulnath launched an initiative called Education For All (EFA), provided free access to BYJU'S learning content for underprivileged Indian students. As reported in Indian mainstream press, the programme aimed to touch this number to 5 Million by 2025.

== Views ==
=== Education ===
Byju Raveendran has publicly made statements that the current education system trains students on solving problems rather than training them to find problems and hence the education system has a lot of flaws including lack of good teachers and classrooms.

He admitted that the education system instills the fear of exams in students and a lot of focus is given on facts memorization rather than encouraging children to learn.

== Controversies ==
On 26 May 2026, a court in Singapore sentenced him to six months in prison for contempt of court which was later rolled back by the court on the grounds of civil contempt order.

Byju has been involved in a prolonged legal battle arguing that a corporate raid was conducted on Byju's and the NCLAT has put all bidding on Byju's assets on hold.

== Personal life ==
Byju Raveendran married Divya Gokulnath in 2009. The two first met in Bengaluru when she joined one of his CAT preparation classes. She later became a co-founder of Byju’s, as reported by Fortune India (2020), and has been closely involved in areas such as curriculum development and working with educators. Their association, which spans both personal and professional spheres, has been noted in several media profiles including CNBC, Bloomberg, and Forbes. The couple has three children—two sons and a daughter.

== Awards and recognition ==
Year	Title	Ref
2017	The Indian Express IT Awards	
2019	Manorama News Newsmaker award	
2020	Ernst & Young Finalist, Entrepreneur of the Year, India and Winner, Business Transformation Award	
2020	Fortune Magazine's '40 Under 40' list	
2021	Forbes India Leadership Award (FILA) Entrepreneur for the Year	
