= Osmo (game system) =

Line of educational games by Tangible Play

Tangible Play (Parent Company)
- Founded: August 31, 2014; 12 years ago
- Founder: Pramod Sharma
- Headquarters: Palo Alto, California, United States
- Key people: Neil D. Bloom
- Website: www.playosmo.com

Osmo is a line of hands-on educational digital/physical games product by the company Tangible Play, based in Palo Alto, California. Osmo's products are built around its proprietary "Reflective Artificial Intelligence", a system that uses a stand and a clip-on mirror to allow an iPad or iPhone's front-facing camera to recognize and track objects in the physical play space in front of the device.

== Awards ==
Date	Award	Category	Recipient(s) and nominee(s)	Result
2014	Time Magazine	Best Inventions of the Year	Osmo	Won
2014	Parents' Choice Awards	Gold Award	Osmo	Won
2015	Oppenheim Toy Portfolio	Platinum Award	Osmo	Won
2015	Toy of the Year Awards	Educational Toy of the Year	Osmo	Nominated
2016	Parents' Choice Awards	Gold Award	Osmo	Won
2016	Oppenheim Toy Portfolio	Gold Seal Award	Osmo	Won
2017	Toy of the Year Awards	Educational Toy of the Year	Osmo	Nominated

== Development ==
Osmo was developed by Tangible Play, a company founded in 2013 by Pramod Sharma and Jérôme Scholler ”two Stanford alums and ex-Googlers with kids.” They were inspired by observing Sharma's daughter, then five years old, interact with an iPad. "She had her face glued to screen, which seems unhealthy and not natural," according to Sharma. The partners created a game system that uses a mirror over the camera to turn the screen into “an interactive partner in physical games”

Time named Osmo one of the 25 Best Inventions of 2014 and in 2017, Fast Company named Osmo one of the top ten “most innovative companies” in education. Osmo games are available for sale online and in retail outlets such as Target and the Apple Store. Osmo was acquired by Byju's in January 2019 for $120 million.

== Studio bankruptcy ==
On January 25, 2024, lenders began bankruptcy proceedings against Osmo's parent company Byju's in an effort to repay its loans. On February 1, 2024, Byju's U.S. division filed for Chapter 11 bankruptcy in Delaware. Byju's would raise around $200 million in an effort to clear "immediate liabilities" and for other operational costs. In December 2025, Osmo was purchased out of bankruptcy by "small but passionate team" who has re-launched the core Osmo products on their website and Amazon.

== Products ==
=== Words ===
Words is a game where players examine on-screen picture clues and then spell out words with tangible letter tiles.

=== Tangram ===
In a modern version of the classic educational game, children arrange tangible tangram pieces to match shapes they see on the screen. Tangrams are good for developing spatial awareness skills.

=== Newton ===
Newton is a physics-based game where players direct small bouncing balls into targeted areas by drawing platforms and ramps, or even by placing physical objects in the playing space.

=== Numbers ===
Numbers is an ocean-themed math game, where players try to pop bubbles and free fish by getting an effective combination of number tiles on the table.

=== Masterpiece ===
Masterpiece uses computer vision to analyze any image and translate it into a traceable image.

=== Coding Awbie ===
Players learn about coding by placing magnetically linking coding blocks in sequences to control a character.

=== Monster ===
Mo, the monster, takes kids real-life drawings and incorporates them into his animated world.

=== Pizza Co. ===
Pizza Co. combines cooking and entrepreneur play with interactive tokens representing ingredients and money.

=== Coding Jam ===
Coding Jam teaches coding concepts through the creative act of making music.

=== Hot Wheels™ MindRacers ===
Osmo partnered with Mattel to create MindRacers, a game combining real Hot Wheels™ cars with virtual on-screen racetracks.
