= Divya Gokulnath =

Co-founder and Director of BYJU's

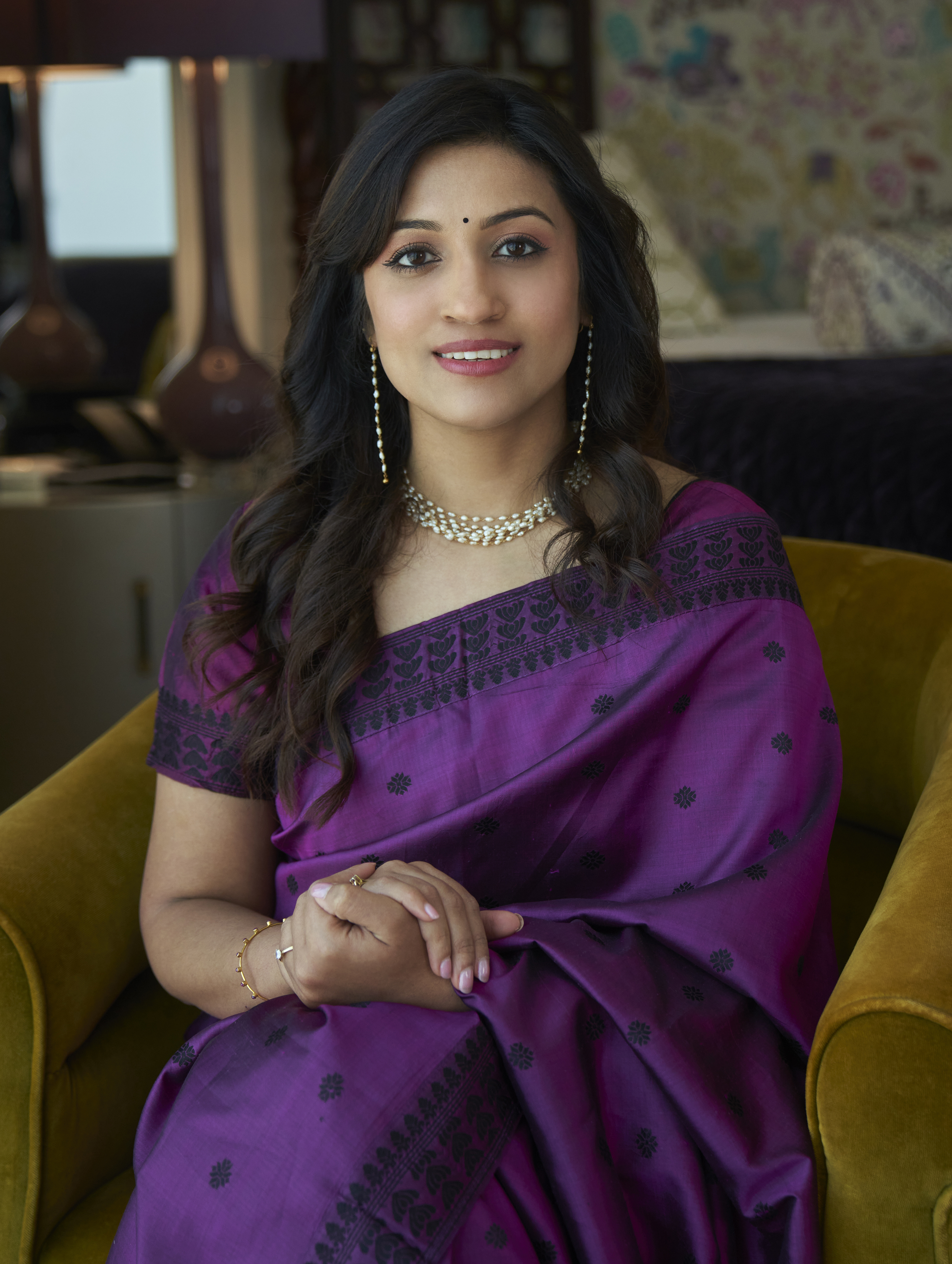
- Divya Gokulnath in 2022
- Born: 21 April 1987 (age 39)
- Education: R.V. College of Engineering
- Occupations: Entrepreneur; Educator
- Years active: 2008–present
- Title: Co-founder of Byju's
- Spouse: Byju Raveendran
- Children: 3

Divya Gokulnath (born 21 April 1987) is an Indian entrepreneur and educator who is the co-founder of Byju's, an educational technology company founded in 2011 in Bangalore, India.

== Early life and education ==
Divya was born and raised in Bengaluru. Her father worked as a Wing Commander in Indian Air Force, while her mother was a programming executive with Doordarshan. Divya is the only child of her parents. During her childhood, Divya's father taught her science.

Divya, a graduate of Frank Anthony Public School, went on to receive a Bachelor of Technology in Biotechnology from RV College of Engineering.

After her graduation in 2007, she met Byju Raveendran, her instructor for GRE preparation. Byju encouraged her to become a teacher due to her questions during breaks between the classes.

Her career as a teacher began in 2008 at age 21. In 2020, she told Fortune India, "It was an auditorium-style class with 100 students. They were just a couple of years younger than me so to look mature I wore a saree to the class." During her teaching career, she taught mathematics, English, and logical reasoning.

== Career ==
In 2011, Divya and her husband co-founded Byju's, an online education platform initially providing in-person education to support school learning, followed by an online app that features video lessons. With her expertise, Divya has served as a teacher in some educational videos.

During the COVID-19 pandemic, Divya took charge of user experience, content, and brand marketing to ensure uninterrupted learning for students. As a result of these efforts, Byju's educational content was made available for free to students during the pandemic, leading to the addition of 13.5 million new users, bringing the total to 50 million by April 2020 and a total of 70 million students by September 2020, eventually garnering 4.5 million subscribers.

According to Forbes, as of 2020, Divya, her husband Byju Raveendran and his brother Riju Raveendran, have a combined net worth of $3.05 billion.

Divya also writes online, including about the future of education, parenting, and women's participation in STEM fields and has been an advocate for mitigating the gender pay gap in India. She has also spoken with Mint Startup Diaries about challenges for women entrepreneurs, and co-written an opinion article with Byju Raveendran in Vogue India about educational technology in India.

In March 2022, Divya Gokulnath was appointed as the Federation of Indian Chambers of Commerce & Industry's EdTech Taskforce Chair.

In February 2024, the Karnataka High Court stopped an attempt by some Byju's shareholders to remove leadership roles from Byju Raveendran, Divya Gokulnath, and Riju Raveendran, pending further court proceedings on 13 March.

== Honours and awards ==
Year	Title	Ref
2019	LinkedIn Top Voices: India	
2020	LinkedIn Top Voices: India	
2020	Business Today Most Powerful Women in Indian Business	
2020	Femina Power List	
2020	Forbes Asia's Power Businesswomen	
2020	Fortune India Most Powerful Women	
2021	Fortune 50 Most Powerful Women In Business	
2021	Kotak Private Banking's Hurun Leading Wealthy Women List for 2021	
2022	Fortune India 40 under 40	
2022	The Indian Express' ExpressAWE	

== Personal life ==
Divya is married to Byju Raveendran. As of April 2020, Divya lived with eleven other family members, including their young son and then their second child was born near the beginning of 2021. Before the COVID-19 pandemic, she worked long days at the office, but during the lockdown, began working from home.

In 2021, she told The Indian Express, that her typical day includes "juggling son's online classes, meetings, recording video lessons and spending time with a newborn."
