= Network Browser =

Mac OS computer application

Network Browser was an application that shipped with Mac OS 8.5 to allow users to connect to other computers on a network, access FTP servers, and connect to network printers. It was intended to replace the Chooser that shipped with previous versions. For Mac OS 9, Apple upgraded Network Browser to support open standards such as Service Location Protocol, making it interoperable with network resources beyond AppleTalk servers. Apple replaced Network Browser with the Connect to Server feature within the "Go" menu of the desktop shell in Mac OS X.

== See also ==
- Safari — Apple's current web browser
- Mail — Apple's current eMail client
- Finder (10.2+) — Apple later integrated FTP functionality into the Finder
- Address Book — Apple's system-level address book service
- Claris Emailer — Apple's eMail client
