= Epic! =

Children's subscription-based reading and learning platform

- Industry: Subscription service
- Founded: 2013; 13 years ago
- Founder: Suren Markosian; Kevin Donahue
- Headquarters: Redwood City, California, U.S.
- Area served: Worldwide
- Products: E-books, education, digital media
- Parent: Byju's
- Website: www.getepic.com

Epic! is an American kids subscription-based reading and learning platform. It offers access to books and videos targeted at children ages 12 and under. The service can be used on desktop and mobile devices.

Epic! was founded in 2013 by Suren Markosian and Kevin Donahue and launched in 2014. Indian educational technology company Byju's acquired Epic! in July 2021 in a cash and stock deal worth $500 million.

On January 25, 2024, lenders began bankruptcy proceedings against Epic's parent company Byju's in an effort to repay its loans. On February 1, 2024, Byju's U.S. division filed for Chapter 11 bankruptcy in Delaware. Byju's would raise around $200 million in an effort to clear "immediate liabilities" and for other operational costs.

== Overview ==
The Epic! app offers personalized recommendations based on a child's reading level and interest. Users can search for books, videos, and quizzes on Epic! based on age, keyword, and reading levels. Books are available in read-to-me and audiobook formats and include both non-fiction and fiction titles, covering subjects and themes such as: STEM, language arts, social science, history, music, art, science fiction and DIY. Titles and series include BIG NATE, Garfield, Warriors and The Chronicles of Narnia series. Books are available in English, French, Spanish, Chinese, and bilingual options.

== Publishing network ==
As of February 2024, Epic! had 250 publisher and video provider partners, including HarperCollins, Macmillan, Candlewick, National Geographic Kids, Smithsonian Enterprises and Encyclopædia Britannica. Epic! is a member of publishing industry trade groups, including: the Children's Book Council, the Independent Book Publishers Association, the Educational Book & Media Association and the Audio Publishers Association.

== Recognition ==
- 2016 Best App for Teaching and Learning; and The Best Website for Teaching and Learning (The American Association of School Librarians).
