= Internet Config =

Internet preferences manager and API for Mac OS Classic

Internet Config was an Internet preferences manager and API for Mac OS Classic. It was originally developed by Quinn! The Eskimo, Peter N Lewis and Marcus Jager and released in 1994 into the public domain. It was later bundled by Apple Inc.

Internet Config's purpose was to consolidate what was, at the time, an unwieldy number of options and settings related to Internet use that had not yet been integrated into the operating system's own control panel. Some settings were for a systemwide default web browser, home page, default FTP client, systemwide default download folder, and email settings. Internet Config represented an important ease of use advantage for the Macintosh platform on the early Internet.

The software consisted of two pieces, the Internet Config control panel — which was actually just a normal application — and an 'appe' extension that launched at boot time but did not patch any system traps.

Internet Config enabled the ability for applications to support command-clicking of URLs displayed anywhere onscreen and have the URLs sent to the user selected application. For example, http: URLs would be sent to the selected web browser, ftp: URLs to the selected FTP client, mailto: URLs to the selected Email application, and so on. This functionality was made optional systemwide, as it did have to patch one trap, _TEClick.

Internet Config also provided functionality to ease interoperability of the Macintosh type and creator code system with the file extensions used on the Internet and on other operating systems. API functions were provided to map file extensions to Mac type/creator information, and vice versa.

The public domain licensing of the project and the tight Macintosh Internet community in the late 1990s led to the rapid adoption of the facility, and then to Apple bundling it as part of Mac OS. The Internet Config calls ended up being part of Carbon and Mac OS X, with the header and library files now part of Universal Interfaces and Headers.
