= Chooser (Mac OS) =

Program for Macintosh systems

- Chooser version 7.6.2, Mac OS 9.1.
- Developer: Apple Computer
- Stable release: 7.6.2
- Operating system: Classic Mac OS
- Type: Printer and network utility

The Chooser is an application program for Macintosh systems using the classic Mac OS. The Chooser started out as a desk accessory and became a standalone application program as of System 7. The Chooser allowed users to connect to AppleShare file servers (via AppleTalk or TCP/IP), enable or disable the network access, and select which printer to use.

== History ==
The original Macintosh computer included two high-speed (for the era) serial ports that were used for most external connectivity. This included printers, which had to be adapted for use on the Mac through the addition of such a port, or an adaptor. Any device could be plugged into either port, which meant that some system needed to be used to identify which port had a printer, possibly both.

A small desk accessory called Choose Printer allowed the printer driver and serial port to be selected for the connected printer. It did this by listing known printer drivers, displayed as icons of the printer model in question, and allowing the user to select it by clicking on the icon. The icons were expected to physically resemble the printer in question and were contained in the drivers' resource fork. At this point the two serial ports appeared, allowing the user to indicate which port that printer was connected to.

When Apple introduced the LaserWriter, its very high cost meant that the only cost-effective way to use it was shared among a small workgroup of Macintoshes. This necessitated the inclusion of AppleTalk, a simple networking implementation which used low-cost cabling and the same physical RS-422 serial port hardware. It was a natural extension of Choose Printer to include the ability to select the LaserWriter and also which port was used to connect its network connection.

As AppleTalk became useful for other types of networking, such as file sharing, the Choose Printer accessory was renamed to simply Chooser. The Chooser became the main point to add top-level configuration options for both networking and printing.

Apple replaced Chooser with Network Browser in Mac OS 9 and, starting with Mac OS X 10.0, by integrated networking features in the Finder. For the printing functions, they were found in the separate Print Center (10.0–10.2) and Printer Setup Utility (10.3–10.4) applications and in the Print & Fax (10.3–10.6), Print & Scan (10.7–10.8) and Printers & Scanners (10.9 and later) panes in System Preferences (10.0–12) and System Settings (13 and later) applications.
