= Ruangguru =

Indonesian education company

PT Ruang Raya Indonesia
- Industry: Education
- Founded: April 1, 2014
- Founders: Belva Devara; Iman Usman
- Headquarters: Jakarta, Indonesia
- Area served: Indonesia Thailand (as StartDee) Vietnam (as Kiến Guru)
- Key people: Belva Devara (CEO); Iman Usman (COO)
- Brands: Kursus for Kids Roboguru (Roboguru Plus) Ruangbaca Ruangbelajar Ruangkelas Ruangguru for Kids Ruanguji Ruangguru Privat Ruangpengajar Ruangpeduli Brain Academy English Academy Skill Academy Ruangkerja Ruangguru Clash of Champions Ruangguru Academy of Champions Ruangguru Champions World and Champions Land
- Owner: Ruangguru Pte. Ltd.
- Website: www.ruangguru.com

PT Ruang Raya Indonesia, doing business as Ruangguru, is a startup company focusing in education. The premium service focuses on helping students in understanding school curriculums, as well as helping with exams, particularly standardised tests.

In 2021 Ruangguru was ranked #25 as the world's most innovative company and #2 as the most innovative education company by Fast Company.

== History ==
Ruangguru (a play of the phrase ruang guru, literally "teachers' office") was founded in April 2014 by Adamas Belva Syah Devara and Muhammad Iman Usman to aid students to find various tutors online. As of August of the same year, there were more than one thousand teachers registered. Ruangguru was also funded by East Ventures.

In February 2016, Ruangguru introduce its beta version of Android app and full version in April.

On July 5, 2017, UOB Venture Management was reported to fund Ruangguru as the third funder with Series B financing.

Ruangguru secured a US$150 million Series C funding round in December 2019, led by General Atlantic. After claiming a profitable 2020, they secured another $55 million in April 2021 in a round led by Tiger Global. It is one of the most well-funded Indonesian and Southeast Asian startups.

And in early 2022, Ruangguru acquired Kalananti, a coding lesson based in Ciputat, Tangerang, Banten, Indonesia.

In July 2022, Ruangguru also acquired Schoters, a digital education platform which provides end-to-end preparation programs for students and professionals to study abroad with scholarships.

== Service ==
In Ruangguru, lessons that are provided are school-related subjects, foreign languages, musics, sports, and others. Ruangguru receives 20% of the transactions made.

== Corporate ==
According to Kompas, a Singapore-based company Ruangguru Pte Ltd owns 99.99% of PT Ruang Raya Indonesia's shares.

== Controversy ==
Despite Ruangguru's status as a high-profile, high-valuation startup, outsourced workers on social media alleged the Indonesian edtech "soonicorn" Ruangguru of paying them below the local minimum wage in March and April 2021. In response, Devara took to Twitter to respond to the allegations from interns.
