= AppleLink =

Defunct Apple service

AppleLink was the name of both Apple Computer's online service for its dealers, third-party developers, end users, and the client software used to access it. Prior to the commercialization of the Internet, AppleLink was a popular service for Mac and Apple IIGS users. The service was offered from about 1986 to 1994 to various groups, before being superseded by their short-lived eWorld and finally today's multiple Apple websites.

== Early years ==
The original AppleLink, which went online in 1985, was a service available only to Apple employees and dealers, and shortly thereafter to Apple University Consortium members. Apple's consumer 800 number in fact touted this fact, promoting your dealer as the place to turn for help because of his access to AppleLink. In the late 1980s the service was also opened up to software developers, who could use it both as an end-user support system as well as a conduit to Apple development for questions and suggestions.

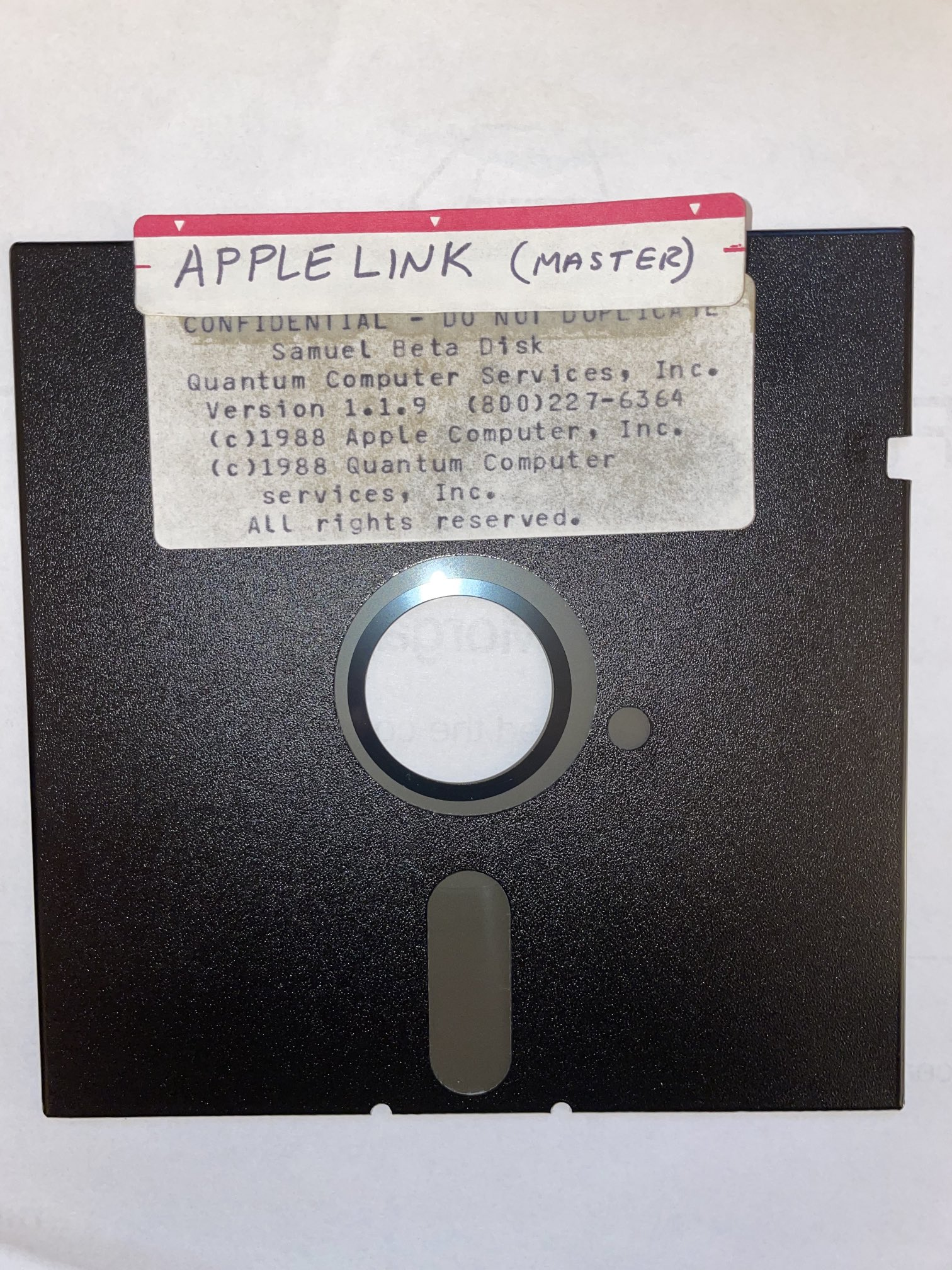
Samuel Beta Disk. Version 1.1.9. Apple Computer Inc & Quantum Computer Services Inc.

AppleLink used client software written in Pascal under contract to Apple by Pete Burnight/Central Coast Software. The program extended the desktop metaphor of the Macintosh Finder to encompass the areas on the remote server site. These were displayed as folders and files just as local folders and files were. In addition, there was a set of public bulletin boards, and the ability to use email via the service—although initially only between AppleLink users. File transfer for drivers and system software was another important role, and for this Apple created the AppleLink Package format to combine and compress the two forks of a Macintosh file into one for storage and sending. Apple also developed their Communications Control Language (CCL) for AppleLink, a language still used in a very similar form for today's Macintosh modem scripts.

The "back end" of the AppleLink system was hosted on General Electric's Information Services (GEIS) (division) Mark III time-sharing mainframes and worldwide communications network. AppleLink translated the user's GUI actions into a transaction protocol that was sent into a server program running on the mainframe. The connection used a proprietary error free sliding window protocol called EF3. Later versions upgraded this protocol to GEIS' "EFX" (Error-Free eXtended) protocol. GEIS charged fairly substantial prices to Apple, both for maintaining the service (about $30 million per year), and the end-users' connection fees of about $15 an hour during business hours (which Apple rebilled to the users). For some years prior to the discontinuation of the system, GEIS maintained a number of employees on the campus of Apple's Cupertino, California, headquarters, co-located with the Apple On-Line Services organization. Repeated attempts to negotiate a lower cost failed, and Apple management chafed at paying for a service that had no obviously measurable income.

Eventually Apple approached Steve Case of Quantum Computer Services, who ran a somewhat similar system for users of the Commodore 64. They reached an agreement in which Apple and Quantum would develop a new system known as AppleLink Personal Edition, which would be intended for end-users until all existing AppleLink content could be moved over and the system proved itself stable enough for support services as well. Beta-test users were generally disappointed that the new service did not give them access to the "real" AppleLink, and eventually the service was released instead as America Online. Aaron Marcus and Associates, Inc., under contract to Apple and working closely with Apple's software engineers, designed the icons, dialogue boxes and screen layout for AppleLink Personal Edition. These icons and some dialogue boxes were incorporated into the first graphical user-interface design of America Online.

Meanwhile, interested in selling the system to other customers, GEIS developed both DOS and eventually Windows based versions of the client software and sold the system as "DealerTalk" starting in 1986, aiming at the Apple model of manufacturers using the system to communicate with their dealers. All the systems, including the AppleLink community, were united behind the scenes as part of GEIS' worldwide Quik-Comm E-mail service and could exchange mail with each other and all GEIS mail customers, using addresses like MICHAEL@APPLELINK or JOHNDOE@GEIS. This was later expanded to include Internet email addresses. Eventually, the GEIS products were renamed BusinessTalk and after a complete system rewrite and creation of their own Macintosh client program (never incorporated into AppleLink), again renamed BusinessTalk System 2000 in 1992. During this time the system, with the Windows client, also became the foundation for Microsoft's first on-line service for developers, the Microsoft Partner Network (MSPN).

== E-mail from space ==
On August 9, 1991, AppleLink, running on a Macintosh Portable was used to send the first e-mail from space, aboard the Space Shuttle Atlantis, mission STS-43.

Atlantis astronauts Shannon Lucid and James C. Adamson with the help of Dave Crego, an engineer at Apple, sent a message to Marcia Ivins, a shuttle communicator at Johnson Space Center. The Message read:

"Hello Earth ! Greetings from the STS-43 Crew. This is the first AppleLink from space. Having a __GREAT__ time, wish you were here,... send cry, and CS! Have a nice day...... Haste la vista, baby,... we'll be back!"

The AppleLink software was configured with a special Macintosh Communications ToolBox Connection Tool that interfaced to NASA's communication system which allowed the Shuttle to call up GEIS' network from space. The Shuttle's e-mail address was secret, but exposed to GEIS' e-mail network as any other AppleLink address. To avoid a deluge of incoming mail resulting from the publicity of the event, Apple set up a number of obvious "honeypot" addresses not really used by the Shuttle crew, such as STS43@APPLELINK. Most of the well-wishers' e-mail went there, rather than to the real Atlantis address.

== Demise ==
Quantum retained rights to the AppleLink Personal Edition software, and released a version for both the Mac and Microsoft Windows machines in 1989, calling the new service America Online as Apple owned the AppleLink name. In 1991 the service had grown substantially, and the company was renamed as America Online Inc. The original AOL Macintosh software still retained within it vestiges of its GEIS/AppleLink heritage. It was not lost on GEIS engineers that it included a version of their proprietary EF3 protocol which was never Apple's intellectual property to share with Quantum. It was handed over anyway as part of the Macintosh source code, thanks to John Sculley, Apple's CEO at the time. Although no legal action was ever pursued, this further soured the technical relationship between GEIS and Apple in the final years of AppleLink, especially since by then AOL was competing with GEIS' own consumer service, GEnie. As a result, when GEIS developed the improved EFX and upgraded AppleLink, it never released source code to Apple, supplying only a copyrighted code-resource for the protocol.

Apple, encouraged by AOL's success and still wanting to turn the cost of AppleLink into a profit center, decided to re-enter the market. After a months-long RFP process that included GEIS as an unsuccessful bidder, Apple approached AOL at the end of 1992 to host a private-label system known as eWorld. By this time AOL had grown to be both much larger than GEIS, so all AppleLink content was to be moved over as well, allowing the GEIS service to be shut down. The eWorld software was basically a version of the original AOL software with custom graphics, giving it a distinctive look. The system was ready for launch in mid-1994.

However, by this point the rapid rise of the World Wide Web was generally killing off all smaller online services and bulletin board systems, and online systems were generally seen as antiquated. Apple was never able to turn a profit on eWorld, and shut it down after a little over a year of operation, before it was able to supplant AppleLink. Subsequently, Apple moved all of its services and replaced all of the AppleLink content. The first step involved a site within AOL's Computing Channel at keyword "Apple". Later, this site was shut down and replaced with website addressed by subdomains under apple.com. The AppleLink service itself was finally shut down at the end of March 1997.

AppleLink's server machines (not the GEIS mainframes) were named for various famous musical composers: Beethoven, Copland, Lennon, etc.

== See also ==
- GEnie
- Quantum Link
