= Online service provider =

Type of service provider

An online service provider (OSP) can, for example, be an Internet service provider, an email provider, a news provider (press), an entertainment provider (music, movies), a search engine, an e-commerce site, an online banking site, a health site, an official government site, social media, a wiki, or a Usenet newsgroup.

Historically, it referred to a commercial computer communication service in which paid members could dial via a computer modem the service's private computer network and access various services and information resources such as bulletin board systems, downloadable files and programs, news articles, chat rooms, and electronic mail services. The term "online service" was also used in references to these dial-up services. The traditional dial-up online service differed from the modern Internet service provider and Dial-up Internet access in that they provided a large degree of content that was only accessible by those who subscribed to the online service, while ISP mostly serves to provide access to the Internet and generally provides little if any exclusive content of its own.

== History ==
The first commercial online services went live in 1969. CompuServe (owned in the 1980s and 1990s by H&R Block) and The Source (for a time owned by The Reader's Digest) are considered the first major online services created to serve the market of personal computer users. Utilizing text-based interfaces and menus, these services allowed anyone with a modem and communications software to use email, chat, news, financial and stock information, bulletin boards, special interest groups (SIGs), forums and general information. Subscribers could exchange email only with other subscribers of the same service. (For a time a service called DASnet carried mail among several online services, and CompuServe, MCI Mail, and other services experimented with X.400 protocols to exchange email until the Internet rendered these outmoded.)

Other text-based online services followed such as Delphi, GEnie and MCI Mail. The 1980s also saw the rise of independent Computer Bulletin Boards, or BBSes. (Online services are not BBSes. An online service may contain an electronic bulletin board, but the term "BBS" is reserved for independent dialup, microcomputer-based services that are usually single-user systems.)

The commercial services used pre-existing packet-switched (X.25) data communications networks, or the services' own networks (as with CompuServe). In either case, users dialed into local access points and were connected to remote computer centers where information and services were located. As with telephone service, subscribers paid by the minute, with separate day-time and evening/weekend rates.

As the use of computers that supported color and graphics, such the Atari 8-bit computers, Commodore 64, TI-99/4A, Apple II, and early IBM PC compatibles, increased, online services gradually developed framed or partially graphical information displays. Early services such as CompuServe added increasingly sophisticated graphics-based front end software to present their information, though they continued to offer text-based access for those who needed or preferred it. In 1985 Viewtron, which began as a Videotex service requiring a dedicated terminal, introduced software allowing home computer owners access. Beginning in the mid-1980s graphics based online services such as PlayNET, Prodigy, and Quantum Link (aka Q-Link) were developed. Quantum Link, which was based on Commodore-only Playnet software, later developed AppleLink Personal Edition, PC-Link (based on Tandy's DeskMate), and Promenade (for IBM), all of which (including Q-Link) were later combined as America Online.

These online services presaged the web browser that would change global online life 10 years later. Before Quantum Link, Apple computer had developed its own service, called AppleLink, which was mostly a support network targeted at Apple dealers and developers. Later, Apple offered the short-lived eWorld, targeted at Mac consumers and based on the Mac version of the America Online software.

Beginning in 1992, the Internet, which had previously been limited to government, academic, and corporate research settings, was opened to commercial entities. The first online service to offer Internet access was DELPHI, which had developed TCP/IP access much earlier, in connection with an environmental group that rated Internet access.

The explosion of popularity of the World Wide Web in 1994 accelerated the development of the Internet as an information and communication resource for consumers and businesses. The sudden availability of low- to no-cost email and appearance of free independent web sites broke the business model that had supported the rise of the early online service industry.

CompuServe, BIX, AOL, DELPHI, and Prodigy gradually added access to Internet e-mail, Usenet newsgroups, ftp, and to web sites. At the same time, they moved from usage-based billing to monthly subscriptions. Similarly, companies that paid to have AOL host their information or early online stores began to develop their own web sites, putting further stress on the economics of the online industry. Only the largest services like AOL (which later acquired CompuServe, just as CompuServe acquired The Source) were able to make the transition to the Internet-centric world.

A class of dial-up Internet access service providers arose to provide access to the Internet, the internet service provider or ISP. Internet-only service providers like UUNET, The Pipeline, Panix, Netcom, the World, EarthLink, and MindSpring provided no content of their own, concentrating their efforts on making it easy for nontechnical users to install the various software required to "get online" before consumer operating systems came internet-enabled out of the box. In contrast to the online services' multitiered per-minute or per-hour rates, many ISPs offered flat-fee, unlimited access plans. Independent companies sprang up to offer access and packages to compete with the big networks (eg, the-wire.com, 1994 in Toronto and bway.net 1995 in New York). These providers first offered access through telephone and modem, just as did the early online services providers. By the early 2000s, these independent ISPs had largely been supplanted by high speed and broadband access through cable and phone companies, as well as wireless access.

The importance of the online services industry was vital in "paving the road" for the information superhighway. When NCSA Mosaic and Netscape were released in 1994, they had a ready audience of more than 10 million people who were able to download their first web browser through an online service. Though ISPs quickly began offering software packages with setup to their customers, this brief period gave many users their first online experience.

Two online services in particular, Prodigy and AOL, are often confused with the Internet, or the origins of the Internet. Prodigy's Chief Technical Officer said in 1999: "Eleven years ago, the Internet was just an intangible dream that Prodigy brought to life. Now it is a force to be reckoned with." Despite that statement, neither service provided the back bone for the Internet, nor did either start the Internet.

== Online service interfaces ==
The first online service used a simple text-based interface in which content was largely text only and users made choices via a command prompt. This allowed just about any computer with a modem and terminal communications program the ability to access these text-based online services. CompuServe would later offer, with the advent of the Apple Macintosh and Microsoft Windows-based PCs, a GUI interface program for their service. This provided a very rudimentary GUI interface. CompuServe continued to offer text-only access for those needing it. Online services like Prodigy and AOL developed their online service around a GUI and thus unlike CompuServe's early GUI-based software, these online services provided a more robust GUI interface. Early GUI-based online service interfaces offered little in the way of detailed graphics such as photographs or pictures. Largely they were limited to simple icons and buttons and text. As modem speed increased it became more feasible to offer images and other more complicated graphics to users thus providing a nicer look to their services

== Common resources provided by online services ==
Some of the resources and services online services have provided access to include message boards, chat services, electronic mail, file archives, current news and weather, online encyclopedias, airline reservations, and online games. Major online service providers like Compuserve also served as a way for software and hardware manufacturers to provide online support for their products via forums and file download areas within the online service provider's network. Prior to the advent of the web, such support had to be done either via an online service or a private bulletin board system run by the company and accessed over a direct phone line.

=== Usage in other devices ===
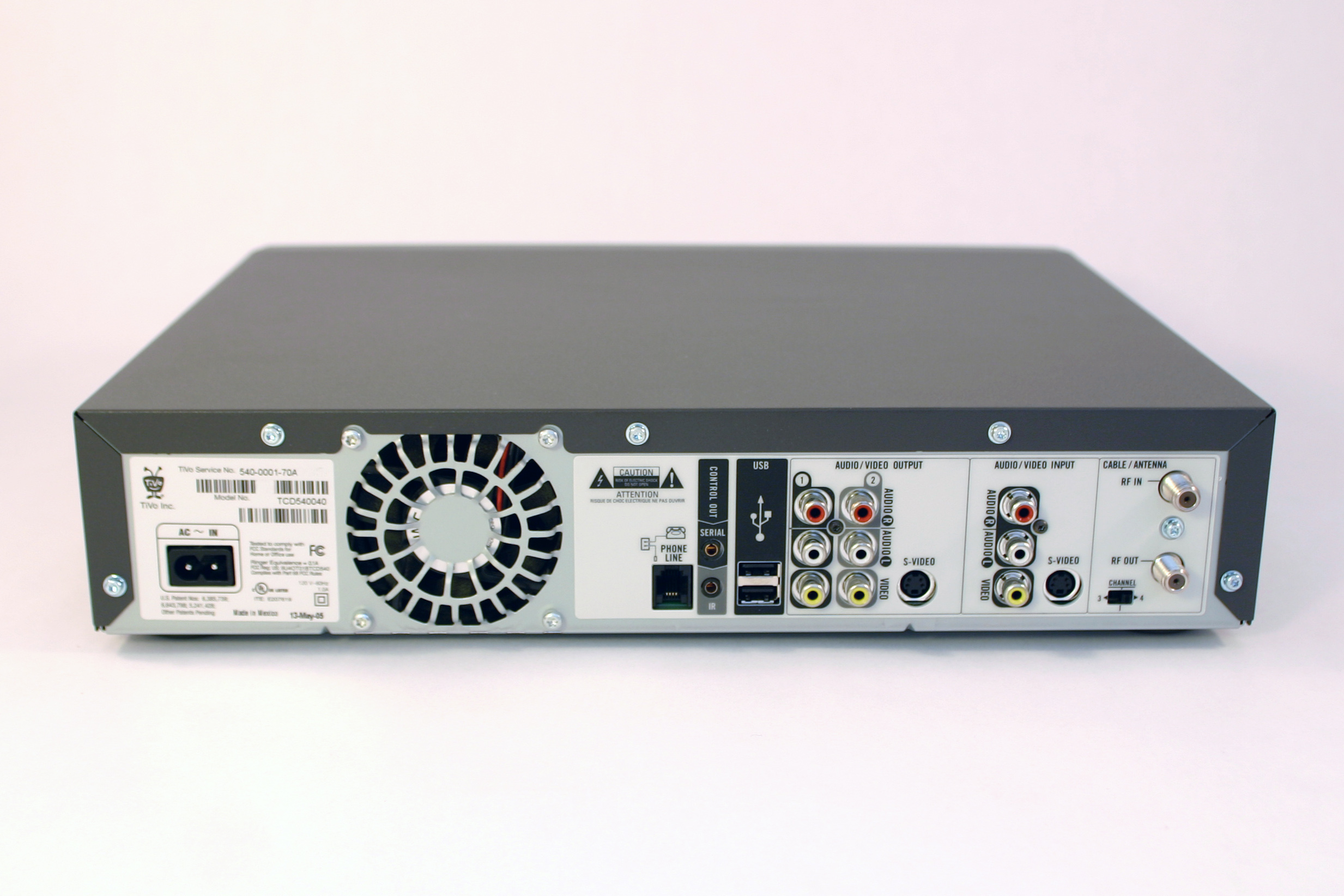
A TiVo Series2 video recorder's back panel. The telephone socket, located near the cooling fan exhaust, is a way for the machine to download its required electronic program guide data.

Other devices, such as satellite receivers and digital video recorders (such as TiVo), have also used a dial-up connection using a household phone socket. This connection allowed to download data at request and to report usage (e.g. ordering pay-per-view) to the service provider. This feature did not require an Internet service provider account – instead, the device's internal modem dialed the server of the service provider directly. These devices may experience difficulties when operating on a VoIP line because the compression could alter the modem signal. Later, these devices moved to using an Ethernet connection to the user's Internet router, which became a more convenient approach due to the growth in popularity of broadband.

== Responsibility ==
Depending on the jurisdiction there may be rules exempting an OSP from responsibility for content provided by users, but with a ' notice and take down (NTD) obligation to remove unacceptable content as soon as it is noticed.

In the U.S., the Online Copyright Infringement Liability Limitation Act (OCILLA) portion of the U.S. Digital Millennium Copyright Act has expanded the legal definition of online service in two different ways for different portions of the law. It states in section 512(k)(1):

(A) As used in subsection (a), the term "service provider" means an entity offering the transmission, routing, or providing of connections for digital online communications, between or among points specified by a user, of material of the user's choosing, without modification to the content of the material as sent or received.
(B) As used in this section, other than subsection (a), the term "service provider" means a provider of online services or network access, or the operator of facilities therefore, and includes an entity described in subparagraph (A).

These broad definitions make it possible for numerous web businesses to benefit from the OCILLA.

== See also ==
- Videotex
- Online service provider law
- Terminal emulator
- Category:Pre-World Wide Web online services
- Service provider
- NSFNet
- Shell account
- Software as a service
- Connect Business Information Network
- Web application
