= Sri Chaitanya Educational Institutions =

Indian educational organisation

Sri Chaitanya Educational Institution
- Motto: Saraina Guruvu
- Motto in English: "The Right Mentor"
- Founders: Boppana Satyanarayana Rao; Bopanna Jhansi Lakshmi Bai; Seema Bopanna; Sushma Bopanna
- Established: 1986 (40 years ago)
- President: Bopanna Jhansi Lakshmi Bai
- Chair: Bopanna Jhansi Lakshmi Bai
- Chief Executive Officer and Director (academic): Sushma Bopanna
- Faculty: ▲5000
- Subsidiaries: Sri Chaitanya Junior Colleges; Sri Chaitanya Degree Colleges; Sri Chaitanya Coaching Institutions of IIT-JEE, NEET, EAMCET and UPSC-CS preparation
- Owner: Bopanna Jhansi Lakshmi Bai
- Location: Headquarters: Vijaywada, Andhra Pradesh; Hyderabad Telangana, India
- Website: srichaitanya.net

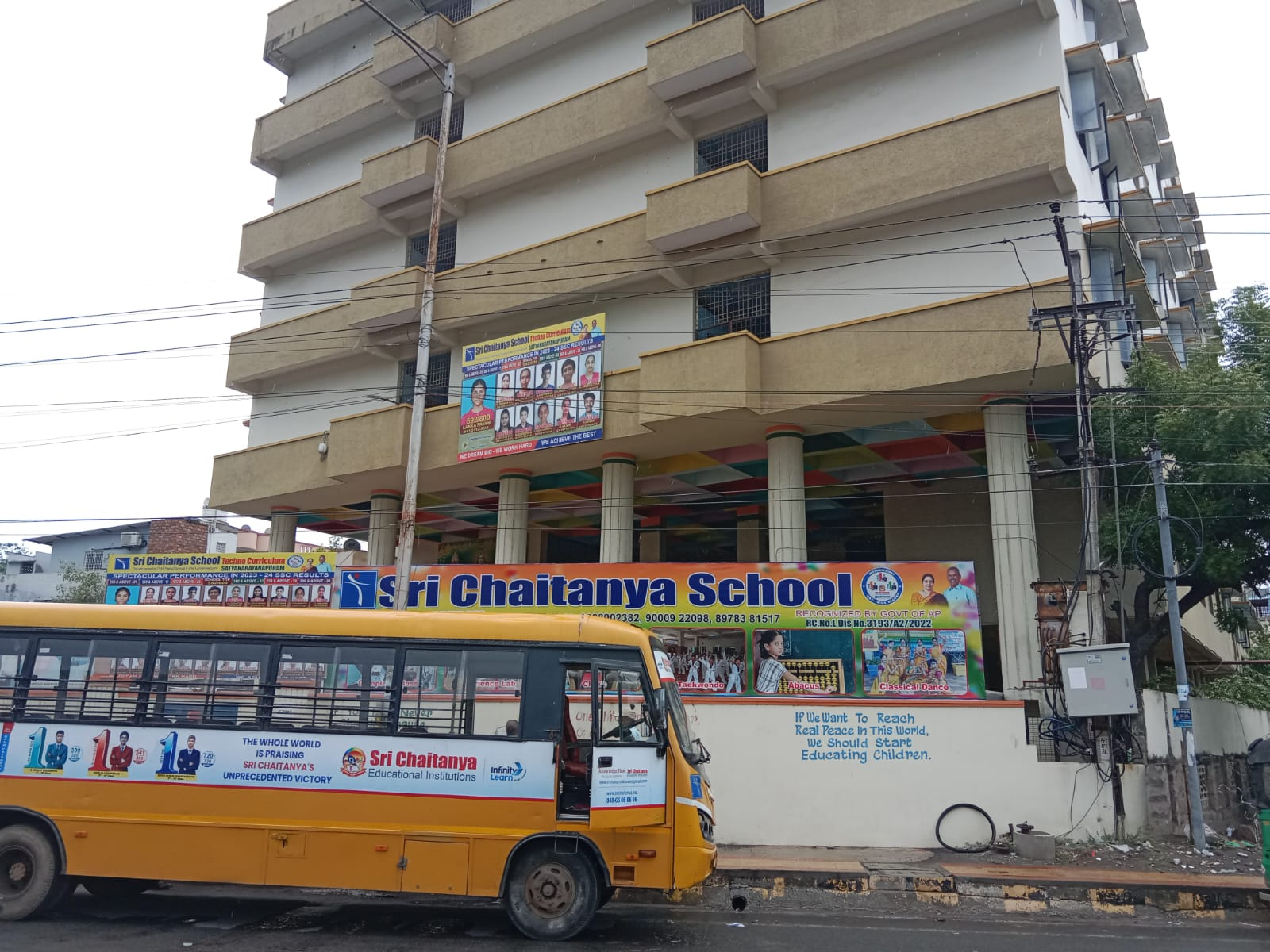
Sri Chaitanya Techno School, B.R.T.S, Middle road, Vijayawada, A.P.

Sri Chaitanya Educational Institutions is a group of education institutions chain of schools, junior colleges, hostels, coaching institutions for IIT-JEE, NEET, EAMCET and UPSC-CS preparation and degree colleges across India. The academic director of Sri Chaitanya is Sushma Bopanna.

It was founded in 1986 by B.S Rao and his wife, Jhansi Lakshmi Bai. With over 321 state board-affiliated junior colleges, 322 K-10 Sri Chaitanya Techno Schools and 107 CBSE-affiliated schools, it is one of Asia's largest educational franchises with over 8.5 lakh students. In 2021, Tollywood actor Allu Arjun was signed as the brand ambassador of the institution.

During the COVID-19 pandemic, Sri Chaitanya launched Infinity Learn as part of its edtech platform, with Rohit Sharma leading the marketing campaign.

== History ==
Logo of Sri Chaitanya Educational Institutions' Techno Schools

Sri Chaitanya was founded in 1986 by Dr. Boppana Satyanarayana Rao and his wife, Dr. Jhansi Lakshmi Bai Boppana. It was initially a junior college for girls in Vijaywada. In 1991, they opened a boys' junior college in Hyderabad (then part of the undivided Andhra Pradesh). New branches were opened in Visakhapatnam (1998) and various other districts of Andhra Pradesh and Telangana.

In 2021, Tollywood star Allu Arjun was signed as the brand ambassador of the institution with the "No Compromise on Success" campaign.

The founder, Dr. Boppana Satyanarayana Rao, died on 13 July 2023 after a heart attack.

== Infinity Learn application ==
Sri Chaitanya launched the Infinity Learn app in 2022, with educational content for classes 6–12 with IIT-JEE, NEET and CBSE board exam coaching. In 2022, it acquired the edtech platform Don't Memorise and a 75% stake in WizKlub.

In December 2024, Infinity Learn partnered with Google Cloud India to utilize artificial intelligence (AI) technologies.

== Results ==
Sri Chaitanya publishes the results of its students in national and state entrance examinations each year. As with other Indian coaching institutes, some top-ranked students are also claimed by other institutes.

=== JEE Advanced ===
In JEE Advanced 2026, Mohit Shekher Shukla, who studied at Sri Chaitanya IIT Academy, secured All India Rank (AIR) 4 and topped the IIT Madras zone. Medisetty Naga Saharsha from Visakhapatnam, who prepared in Hyderabad, secured AIR 9. The institution reported three students in the top 10, including Darsh Sikka (AIR 10), and 4,431 qualifying students overall.

=== JEE Main ===
Pasala Mohith of Andhra Pradesh was among the candidates who scored a perfect 300 out of 300 in JEE Main 2026. Sri Chaitanya lists him among its students.

=== NEET ===
For NEET-UG 2026, the institution reported AIR 3 (Uplakshya Goyal), AIR 5 (Bura Sai Sharan) and AIR 6 (Kandagatla Haneesh) among its students.
