= It girl =

Colloquial term for a young woman with sex appeal

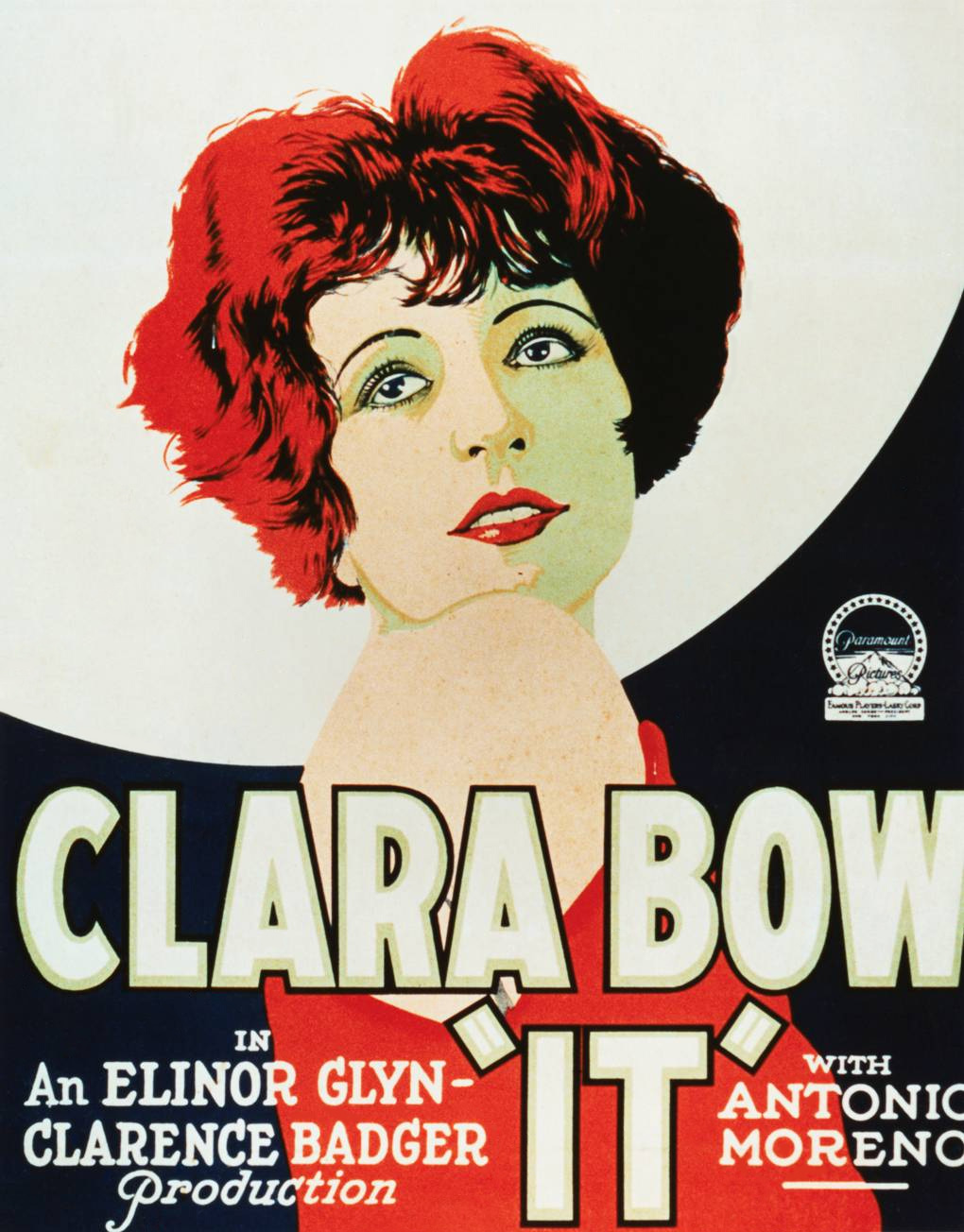
Poster for the film "It" (1927), starring Clara Bow

An "it girl" (Note: Sometimes written as "it" girl.) is an attractive, well-known young woman who is perceived to have both sex appeal and a personality that is especially engaging.

The expression it girl originated in British upper-class society around the turn of the 20th century. It gained further attention in 1927 with the popularity of the Paramount Studios film It, starring Clara Bow. In the earlier usage, a woman was especially perceived as an "it girl" if she had achieved a high level of popularity without flaunting her sexuality. Today, the term is used more simply to apply to fame and beauty. The Oxford English Dictionary distinguishes between the chiefly American usage of "a glamorous, vivacious, or sexually attractive actress, model, etc.", and the chiefly British usage of "a young, rich woman who has achieved celebrity because of her socialite lifestyle".

The male equivalent is an "it boy" or "it man", which are terms sometimes used to describe a male exhibiting similar traits.

== History ==
=== Early use ===
An early literary usage of it in this sense is found in a 1904 short story by Rudyard Kipling ("Mrs Bathurst" in Traffics and Discoveries), which contains the line "'Tisn't beauty, so to speak, nor good talk necessarily. It's just It. Some women'll stay in a man's memory if they once walk down a street."

Elinor Glyn, the notorious British novelist who wrote the book titled It and its subsequent screenplay, lectured:

With It, you win all men if you are a woman and all women if you are a man. It can be a quality of the mind as well as a physical attraction.

— Elinor Glyn (1927)

Glyn first rose to fame as the author of the scandalous 1907 bestseller Three Weeks. She is widely credited with the invention of the "it girl" concept: although the slang predates her book and film, she was responsible for the term's impact on the culture of the 1920s.

In 1927, the Paramount Studios film was planned as a special showcase for its popular star Clara Bow, and her performance introduced the term "it" to the cultural lexicon. The film plays with the notion that "it" is a quality which eschews definitions and categories; consequently, the girl portrayed by Bow is an amalgam of an ingenue and a femme fatale, with some qualities later portrayed by Madonna's latter day "Material Girl" incarnation. By contrast, Bow's rival in the script is equally young and comely, as well as rich and well-bred, yet is portrayed as not possessing "it". Clara Bow later said she wasn't sure what "it" meant, although she identified Lana Turner and later Marilyn Monroe as "it girls".

The fashion component of the "it girl" originated with Glyn's elder sister, couturier Lucy, Lady Duff-Gordon, known professionally as "Lucile". Lucile managed exclusive salons in London, Paris and New York, was the first designer to present her collections on a stage complete with the theatrical accoutrements of lights and music (inspiring the modern runway or catwalk show), and was famous for making sexuality an aspect of fashion through her provocative lingerie and lingerie-inspired clothes. She also specialised in dressing trendsetting stage and film performers, ranging from the stars of the Ziegfeld Follies on Broadway to silent screen icons such as Mary Pickford and Irene Castle.

As early as 1917, Lucile herself used the term "it" in relation to style in her fashion column for Harper's Bazaar: "... I saw a very ladylike and well-bred friend of mine in her newest Parisian frock ... she felt she was 'it' and perfectly happy."

=== Modern "it girls" ===
In the late 1970s the term distanced itself from Bow, as magazines used it to describe Diana Ross. Since the 1980s, the term "it girl" has been used slightly differently, referring to a wealthy, normally unemployed, young woman who is pictured in tabloids going to many parties often in the company of other celebrities, receiving media coverage in spite of no particular personal achievements or TV hosting / presenting. The writer William Donaldson observed that, having initially been coined in the 1920s, the term was applied in the 1990s to describe "a young woman of noticeable 'sex appeal' who occupied herself by shoe shopping and party-going".

In 2023, Matthew Schneier for The Cut, defined the New York "it girl" as being: "Famous for being out, famous for being young, famous for being fun, famous for being famous." Schneier added that an "it girl" does not define itself that way, but that "magazine writers, newspaper columnists, photographers" do. The prominence of an "it girl" is often temporary; some of the rising "it girls" will either become fully-fledged celebrities, commonly initially via appearances on reality TV shows or series; lacking such an accelerant, their popularity will normally fade. Schneier claimed that achieving obscurity is required to be considered one: "An undeniable celebrity is not an 'It' girl."

Editors at The Cut also included a list of over 150 "it girls". Called 'It' Girl Inflation, the article praised the Internet for increasing supply and demand, or democratizing, the "it girl". Notable New York "it girls" included Tinsley Mortimer, Olivia Palermo, Fabiola Beracasa Beckman, Amanda Hearst, Leigh Lezark, Vashtie Kola, Cat Marnell, Audrey Gelman, Tavi Gevinson, Jemima Kirke, Barbie Ferreira, Chloe Wise, Salem Mitchell, Dasha Nekrasova, Ivy Getty, Caroline Calloway, and Eve Jobs.

== Film and theater ==
- Glyn's 1927 film script was adapted into a musical called The It Girl, which opened off-Broadway in 2001 at the York Theatre Company, starring Jean Louisa Kelly.
- It Girls is a 2002 feature documentary film directed by Robin Melanie Leacock, which chronicles the activities of a group of socialites in Manhattan, New York, U.S., during New York Fashion Week.

== See also ==
- Gibson Girl
- 15 minutes of fame
- Famous for being famous
- International Debutante Ball
- It bag
- Sex symbol
- Sexual capital
- Socialite
- Allegra Coleman (fictional "it girl")
