= The Wing (workspace) =

American company (2016–2022)

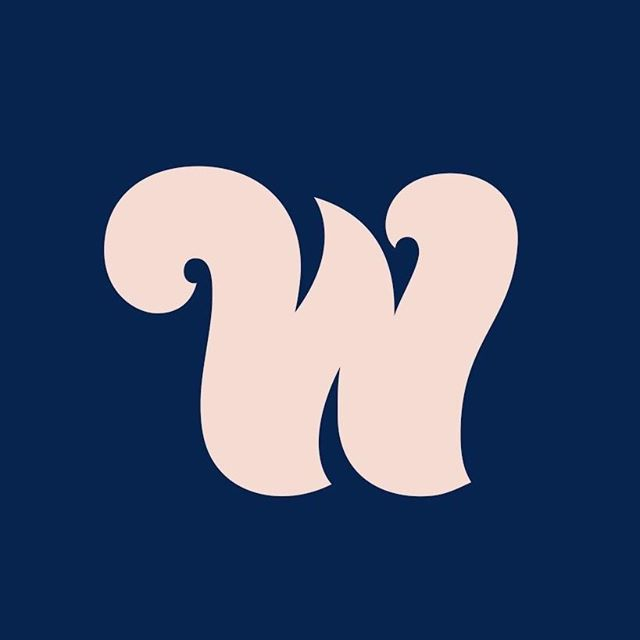
- Company type: Private
- Founded: October 2016; 9 years ago
- Founders: Audrey Gelman; Lauren Kassan
- Defunct: August 30, 2022; 3 years ago
- Headquarters: New York City, New York, U.S.
- Number of locations: 7 (2021)
- Services: Shared workspaces, events, and related services for women freelancers and entrepreneurs

The Wing was a women-focused social club and co-working space with offices in New York City, Washington, D.C., San Francisco, Chicago, Los Angeles, and Boston. It was founded by Audrey Gelman and Lauren Kassan in 2016. As of July 2019, the club had about 10,000 members. At its peak, The Wing had eleven locations in two countries; as of 2021 there were seven branches in the United States. The company ceased operations in August 2022.

The Wing initially only accepted people who identify as women or non-binary, but to comply with non-discrimination laws began accepting people of any gender identity.

After complaints about how The Wing failed to address racist behavior of its members, and an employee walkout, Gelman stepped down as CEO in June 2020.

On August 30, 2022, The Wing ceased operations. This announcement was issued by email to its members, many of whom took to the company's still-active social media to express disdain about the short notice communication.

== History ==
The initial idea for The Wing stemmed from Gelman's desire for a space to change and relax between business meetings as she lived in the New York City borough of Brooklyn, but worked in SoHo, Manhattan, and in Washington, D.C. The first title for this not-yet-created space was Refresh. When Gelman and Lauren Kassan began working together, they decided "The Wing" was a more fitting name, since it would represent a "wing" of the users' home away from their actual home. When developing this idea, the two decided to focus on creating a space where women can feel safe and supported.

In October 2016, Gelman and Kassan founded The Wing in New York City's Flatiron District, on the Ladies' Mile. The company raised $2.4 million from majority women seed investors including SoulCycle's Julie Rice and Elizabeth Cutler as well as Birchbox's Hayley Barna. The Wing closed its Series A funding round led by early-stage venture firm New Enterprise Associates in April 2017. The company raised $8 million from investors including Kleiner Perkins and BBG Ventures. They subsequently opened another branch in a loft in SoHo.

In November 2017, The Wing completed a Series B round led by WeWork (which divested its minority interest in 2020 before its bankruptcy filing of November 2023.). The company raised an additional $32 million bringing their total investment to $42 million. During 2018, The Wing opened new spaces in the Dumbo neighborhood of Brooklyn (its third New York City location) in January; in the Georgetown neighborhood of Washington, D.C., in April; and in San Francisco, California, in October. The Washington, D.C., facility includes a booth dedicated to law professor Anita Hill while the San Francisco space has a conference room dedicated to psychology professor Christine Blasey Ford. At the end of 2018, The Wing announced it would offer on-site childcare services, The Little Wing, as part of the expansion of its SoHo location, which later shuttered, following the 2020 school year.

On March 1, 2018, the New York City Commission on Human Rights began to investigate The Wing's membership operations. At that time, The Wing did not allow men even as guests of members, unlike two other New York City women's clubs noted by The New York Times — Colony Club and Cosmopolitan Club — though it did hire some men such as plumbers and electricians. In June 2018, James E. Pietrangelo says an employee of The Wing told him his application would be automatically denied because he was a man. Pietrangelo, a man described by TechCrunch as "the dictionary definition of litigious", filed a lawsuit in August 2018, which claimed that The Wing's policy violated the District of Columbia's Human Right Act. The Wing responded, stating that prior to August 30, 2018, it had an unwritten policy of only accepting women (including transgender women) and gender non-binary people. The company adopted a formal written policy that took effect in September of that year which accepts members regardless of gender identity. The company says it only accepts about 8% of applicants – those who it judges to be committed to its mission – and that only 12 out of about 26,000 applicants were men. The New York City Commission's investigation ended after the adoption of a formal policy allowing membership to people of any identity.

In December 2018, the company closed a $75-million Series C funding round which was led by Sequoia Capital, and including investors Upfront Ventures, Airbnb and others. Among the investors were leaders of the Time's Up movement including Valerie Jarrett, Robbie Kaplan, Katie McGrath, Hilary Rosen, and Kerry Washington. At the time, The Wing had raised a total of $117.5 million in funding since its founding. In April 2019, The Wing opened its sixth location at the Fulton Market District in Chicago, Illinois. The same month, The Wing opened a seventh location on Santa Monica Boulevard in West Hollywood, California. The West Hollywood location became the second location with an area for children. The location also has a sound-proof screening room and film-themed phone booths named after Princess Leia from Star Wars, C.J. Cregg of The West Wing, Lydia Deetz from Beetlejuice.

The Wing's eighth location opened in June 2019 in the Back Bay area of Boston, Massachusetts. The first draft of subway ads for this new location were rejected by the MBTA for touching on "political issues or matters of public debate" and being potentially demeaning to a group of people (in this case, men). The rejected ads included the slogans "The World was built for men. The Wing is built for you." and "Want to mute the mansplainers and start your own conversation?" The Wing's headquarters opened in the former Stuyvesant Polyclinic in East Village, Manhattan, the same month, occupying all 22,000 square feet (2,000 m^{2}) of the clinic building. At the time, The Wing vacated its SoHo location. Its first international location and ninth overall opened in Fitzrovia, London, in October 2019. Another Manhattan location, near Bryant Park, opened that December, making it The Wing's fourth location in New York City and its tenth location overall.

A location in Williamsburg, Brooklyn, opened in February 2020. Gelman stepped down as CEO that June, in response to employees' complaints about their treatment by members and higher-up staff. At the same time, Celestine Maddy and Ashley Peterson were named co-CEOs.

In August 2020 it was announced that the London branch would permanently close citing the impact of the COVID-19 pandemic as the cause. 300 employees were made redundant during this period.

In February 2021, IWG plc, a provider of serviced offices, bought a majority the company.

In February 2022, Jennifer Cho, chief marketing officer of the company, was appointed CEO.

== Operations ==
Membership costs ranged between $185 and $215 per month for access to a single location and $250 for full access to all locations. In May 2018, The Wing announced it would begin offering scholarships to cover membership fees for a selected few applicants. The scholarships were "aimed at individuals who are currently underrepresented in their member pool and who are working to advance the position of women and girls in society — specifically, those in the fields of teaching, nonprofit, social services, and advocacy." The company offered free two-year memberships including professional mentorship at its various locations in 2018.

At the end of 2019, the company was operating 11 locations, which included a townhouse in the Fitzrovia area of Central London. The Wing's network included more than 10,000 members. In August 2018, The Wing launched an app that allows members to connect digitally, sign in guests, and register for events.

In August 2018, The Wing announced that it would convert the majority of its hourly workers to full-time employees with benefits. This included giving their remaining part-time employees medical benefits, stock options, and increasing their wages to at least $16.50 per hour.

In November 2017, The Wing launched a bi-annual magazine named No Man's Land. The inaugural edition of the magazine featured interviews with musician Remy Ma, publisher Tavi Gevinson, and a cover story featuring actress Hari Nef. The magazine's second issue featured comedian Jessica Williams on the cover. No Man's Land was also the name of The Wing's podcast hosted by historian Alexis Coe. The podcast's six-episode first season won a Webby award for Best Series. and featured what they described as "women who were too bad for your textbooks." Episodes have focused on Stephanie St. Clair, a leader of a Harlem-based criminal syndicate; Ana Mendieta, a Cuban-American artist; and Ida B. Wells, a journalist and early leader in the Civil Rights Movement.

== Workplace criticism ==
Journalist Amanda Hess reported that many women were drawn to seek employment at The Wing, "eager to work in beautiful spaces and in the company of women." Most of the current and former employees she interviewed were excited to begin but became disillusioned, the 26 employees interviewed citing low pay and mistreatment of Black members of staff. Receptionists and event staff did not expect their jobs to include cleaning duties. At Wing events, employees might "find themselves to be the only Black women in the room," where members and their guests "could be casually racist." Salaried employees were often expected to work extra unpaid hours, while hourly wage employees could not get as much work as they wanted. A spokeswoman said The Wing had always "maintained employment best practices," and CEO Audrey Gelman said that these concerns were being addressed by raising wages, increasing employee benefits, instituting a code of conduct for members, and changing the organizational structure. Gelman resigned in June 2020, and later issued a public apology to staff. Gelman's resignation was followed by a strike by employees at The Wing asking for "sweeping changes to the management" with social media reflecting the opinion that "Gelman's resignation is not enough".
