= Yardsellr =

- Industry: E-commerce
- Founded: October 2009 in San Francisco, California, US
- Defunct: February 4, 2013
- Key people: Daniel Leffel; Jed Clevenger; Rachel Makool
- Products: Facebook-based social commerce marketplace
- Website: yardsellr.com

Yardsellr was a San Francisco-based person-to-person online marketplace founded by former eBay executives in October 2009. It was shut down on February 4, 2013 to concentrate more on e-commerce at the short-lived social commerce site CompoundM.

== History ==
Yardsellr launched in January 2010. In November 2010, 1.3 million people were following Yardsellr blocks and by late December 2010, that number had grown to 1.5 million people and was growing by 20,000 followers daily. About 100,000 followers actively commented on the items in the Yardsellr feed, and thousands of transactions occurred. In November 2010, Yardsellr raised $5 million in series A round financing, led by Accel Partners. Harrison Metal Capital, which previously put up $750,000 in seed funding, also participated.

== Website ==
The web property, often called "an eBay for Facebook" utilized Facebook communities in the United States to connect sellers to buyers based on shared interests. Sellers listed items at fixed prices in specific categories, or “Blocks.” Prospective buyers visited the Yardsellr website or Facebook page and “liked” the categories of items they were interested in. When a seller had something to offer in the chosen category, it showed up in the buyer's Facebook News Feed. Among the most active blocks were jewelry, guitars, quilting, scrapbooking, knitting, Star Trek and Star Wars collectibles. Instead of charging sellers fees to list items, as eBay does, Yardsellr charged buyers fees of around 10 percent on their completed purchases. Buyers could use PayPal or pay through Yardsellr. In the latter case, the seller would receive a check mailed from Yardsellr.

A feature that also made Yardsellr different from eBay was the ability for users to make purchases with Photons. According to the Yardsellr Blog, Photons were like money; 100,000 Photons equaled $1 that could be used toward any Yardsellr purchase. Individuals could win Photons, up to 1 million a day, by looking for "$" signs, on what Yardsellr called a "treasure hunt". Users could also gift photons to each other. When a purchase was made using Photons, the seller would still be paid the full price of the item. Photons depleted over time, so a user that did not use them fast would slowly lose them.

== See also ==
- E-commerce
- Online marketplace
- Social network
- Social shopping
