= Ensogo =

- Website type: Electronic commerce
- Available in: English and others
- Founded: 2009
- Website: Ensogo
- Commercial: Yes
- Launched: 2010
- Current status: Defunct

Ensogo was an Australia-based social commerce website that offered members discounted daily deals on restaurants, hotel accommodations, spa services, beauty treatments, activities and retail products.

== History ==
Ensogo started as a legal entity in Thailand in 2009 and soon expanded its operations to Philippines in 2010, then in Indonesia under the name DealKeren. It also operates the following brands:

- LivingSocial (2010), operated in Indonesia and Malaysia
- Dealmates (2011), operated in Malaysia
- Mydeal.com.my, operated in Malaysia and Deal.com.sg, operated in Singapore
- Beecrazy, operated in Hong Kong

In June 2011, Ensogo was acquired by LivingSocial. The acquisition extended to Ensogo in Thailand, Philippines as well as Indonesia. LivingSocial sold their South East Asia operation to Patrick Grove's iBuy Group in April 2014, and iBuy Group floated the IPO to Australian Securities Exchange on December 20 of the same year, renaming iBuy to Ensogo and use the ticker E88.

On June 21, 2016, Ensogo announced that it will shut down all South East Asia operation (including Hong Kong) and its CEO Kris Marszalek has resigned; it also requests ASX to suspend shares trading. The unprecedented shutdown affected operations in several countries; workers in Singapore found the office was closed, Hong Kong sellers call for police investigation of fraud, and certain stores in Thailand rejecting deals purchased by consumers, though the Consumer Protection Board is expected to summon Ensogo executives for remedial issues.
