= Katia Beauchamp =

American entrepreneur

- Born: Austin, Texas
- Education: BA, Vassar College; MBA, Harvard Business School
- Occupation: Entrepreneur

Katia Beauchamp is an American entrepreneur and co-founder of Birchbox.

== Early life and education ==
Katia Beauchamp, (née Ververis), was born in Austin, Texas but moved to El Paso when she was four years old. She was raised by her mother, who is of Mexican descent. Her father, who is Greek, lived in Germany. Beauchamp has a younger brother.

Beauchamp attended several elementary schools in El Paso including Dr. Green Elementary School in West El Paso. She graduated from Coronado High School and later attended Vassar College, graduating in 2005 with a double major in international studies and economics with a minor in Spanish.

== Career ==
After graduating from Vassar College, Beauchamp began her career in structured finance and then moved into commercial real estate.

Beauchamp co-founded Birchbox with Hayley Barna and Mollie Chen in 2010 while they were attending undergrad at Harvard Business School. By 2019, Birchbox had over 1 million subscribers.

In February 2020, Beauchamp announced that Birchbox would be laying off 25% of its global workforce including half of its New York City-based staff. This followed an earlier round of layoffs in 2016 when the company shed 12% of its worldwide headcount. In 2021 Birchbox was acquired by FemTec Health, a women's health company for $45M.

Birchbox was acquired by Retention Brands in May 2023 in lieu of declaring bankruptcy.

In August 2022, Beauchamp was named CEO of Victoria Beckham Beauty, replacing Sarah Creal who co-founded the beauty company. In January 2025, Lauren Edelman replaced Beauchamp as CEO of the company.

== Recognition ==
Beauchamp and her co-founder, Hayley Barna, were named to Inc. Magazine's "30 under 30" list in 2016. The two were also named to Advertising Age's "Women to Watch" in 2012. In 2013, Crain's New York Business included Beauchamp in their annual "30 Under 30" list.

== Personal life ==
Beauchamp met her husband, Greg, when the two were 10 years old and attending Dr. Green Elementary School in El Paso. The couple were engaged on the playground where they first met. The couple has four children: a son, Niko, twin boys, Guy and Alec, and a daughter, West Winter.
