= AddToAny =

Sharing platform

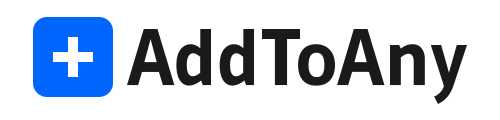
- Company type: Private
- Website type: Social bookmarking
- Available in: Multilingual
- Founded: March 2006
- Headquarters: San Francisco, California
- Area served: Worldwide
- Owner: AddToAny
- Founder: Pat Diven II
- Website: www.addtoany.com
- Registration: None
- Launched: March 2006
- Current status: Active

AddToAny is a universal sharing platform that can be integrated into a website by use of a web widget or plugin. Once installed, visitors to the website can share or save an item using a variety of services. AddToAny makes money by selling anonymous aggregate sharing data to advertisers.

== History ==
The platform launched in March 2006.

In July 2011, AddToAny was acquired by social commerce site Lockerz. Two years later in June 2013, it was acquired by Pat Diven II, the original founder.
