= PTZ =

PTZ may refer to:

- Phenothiazine, a chemical insecticide
- Petrozavodsk, a city in northwest Russia
- Pentylenetetrazol (Metrazol), a circulatory and respiratory stimulant
- PTZ camera, capable of pan, tilt, and zoom movement
- PTZ, IATA code for Rio Amazonas Airport in Pastaza Province, Ecuador
- Pacific Time Zone, name of UTC−8 time zone in the US and Canada
- PTZ, "pointz" collected by users of the defunct social commerce site Lockerz
- PTZ, pressure (P), temperature (T), and compressibility (Z) of a gas in an equation of state
