= Shopow =

Online social shopping website and search engine

Shopow.com is an online social shopping website and shopping search engine. In 2009 Mike Harty and Kevin Flood founded Shopow, meaning "shopper power", which was meant as a place where users could "share deals, reviews and trends with friends". Shopow has also been described as "the Facebook of shopping" Shopow is headquartered in Manchester, England and also has offices in Nottingham, England.

Shopow serves a shopping comparison services to shoppers in the United Kingdom, and also features patent pending technology which is used by publisher websites in order to serve shopping comparison services to their users. As of July 2011, Shopow has a direct working relationship with over 10,000 retailers and has signed up 3,500 members. Shopow allows users to compare prices like traditional price comparison websites but also integrates various social functions which allow users to re-order search results.

Shopow acts as a social commerce platform for online retailers, providing aggregated social network features pertaining to shopping. Shopow's social commerce features a review aggregator service which collects and aggregates reviews from leading e-commerce websites. Shopow acts as the data source for other websites and also offers an Ad serving platform which generates revenue on a CPA basis.

Shopow is part of a new wave of cloud based website applications to come out of the North West of England. Shopow launched in June 2011 having raised £830,000 of Angel funding from business angels in the UK.

As of October 2011, Shopow has over 22,000 retailers.
