= It boy =

Term for a young man with sex appeal

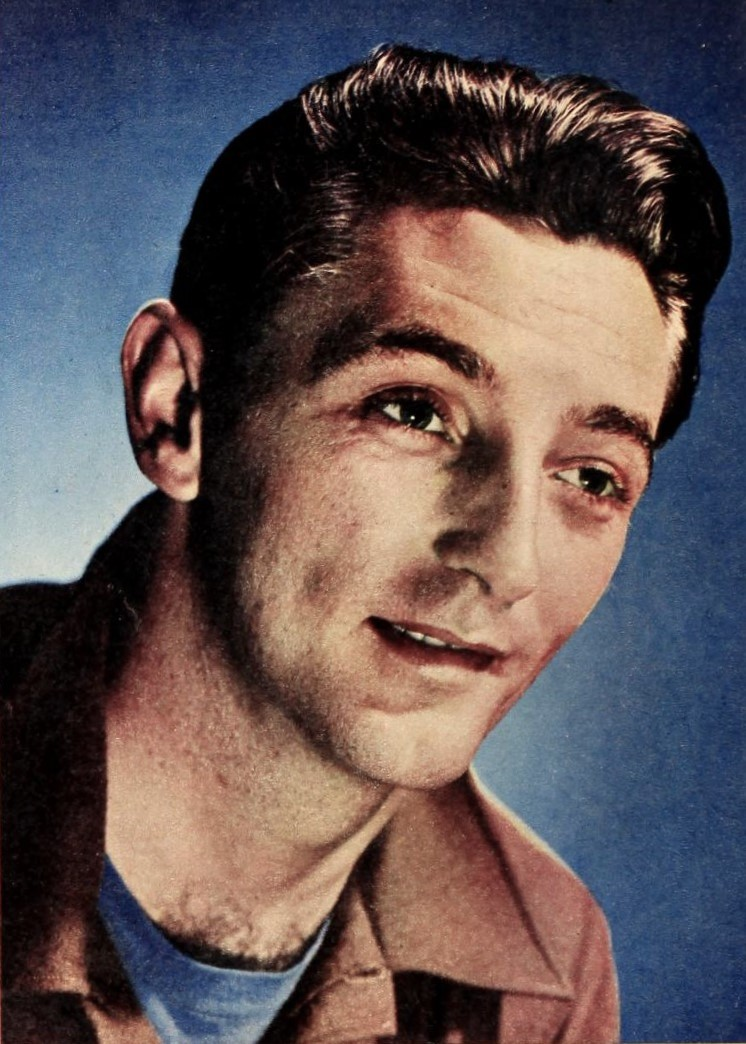
Robert Mitchum was one of the first male movie stars to be labeled an "it man" in the 1950s.

An "it boy" (sometimes "it man") is an attractive young man who is perceived to have both sex appeal and a personality that is especially engaging. The term was coined as the male equivalent of an "it girl".

== History ==
An early literary usage of it in this sense is found in a 1904 short story by Rudyard Kipling ("Mrs Bathurst" in Traffics and Discoveries), which contains the line "'Tisn't beauty, so to speak, nor good talk necessarily. It's just It. Some women'll stay in a man's memory if they once walk down a street."

Elinor Glyn, the notorious British novelist who wrote the book titled It and its subsequent screenplay, lectured:

With It, you win all men if you are a woman and all women if you are a man. It can be a quality of the mind as well as a physical attraction.

— Elinor Glyn (1927)

Glyn first rose to fame as the author of the scandalous 1907 bestseller Three Weeks. She is widely credited with the invention of the "it girl" concept: although the slang predates her book and film, she was responsible for the term's impact on the culture of the 1920s. The term was coined for actress Clara Bow, the star of the popular 1927 Paramount Studios film It.

In 1950, Bow identified Robert Mitchum as an it man. In 1995, Entertainment Weekly referred to Leonardo DiCaprio as "Hollywood's 'It' Boy" because of his "blazing talent and dashing baby-faced looks – a combination of the mystic and the mischievous – that have the praise faucets gushing buckets".

In 2024, Vox published an article titled "Every Hollywood 'it' boy is a white guy," criticizing the entertainment industry for focusing almost exclusively on white actors in the 2020s.

== Examples ==
=== 2010s ===
- BTS, South Korean boy brand founded in 2010.
- Timothée Chalamet (b.1995), American and French actor.

=== 2020s ===
- Jack Schlossberg (b. 1993) American political commentator and author.
- Bach Buquen (b. 2006), French influencer and model.
- Jacob Elordi (b. 1997), Australian actor.
- Callum Turner (b. 1990), English actor.
- Romeo Beckham (b. 2002), English model, son of David and Victoria.
- Manu Ríos (b. 1998), Spanish actor and singer.
