= Martin Mander =

Estonian businesspeople

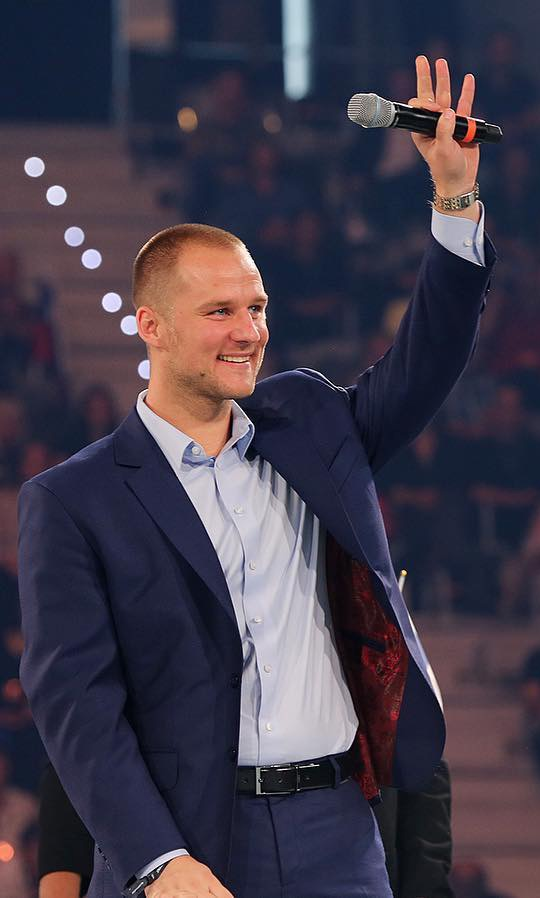
- Born: 19 April 1985 (age 41); Estonian SSR, Soviet Union
- Occupation: Entrepreneur

Martin Mander is an Estonian entrepreneur.

In March 2026, Martin Mander and his business partner Sulev Kohjus were detained by the Central Criminal Police of Estonia. They were arrested based on suspicions of extensive investment fraud by the prosecutor’s office. According to Õhtuleht they invited Estonians to invest in their own bank and cryptocurrency, both of which only exist on paper. Both men remained in custody pending trial as of May 2026.

In 2012, he was awarded Mr. Year Estonia pageant by Manhunt International. In 2018, he was named the only level 8 marketer in Estonia by MyWorld.
