= Wireless (short story) =

- Short story by Rudyard Kipling
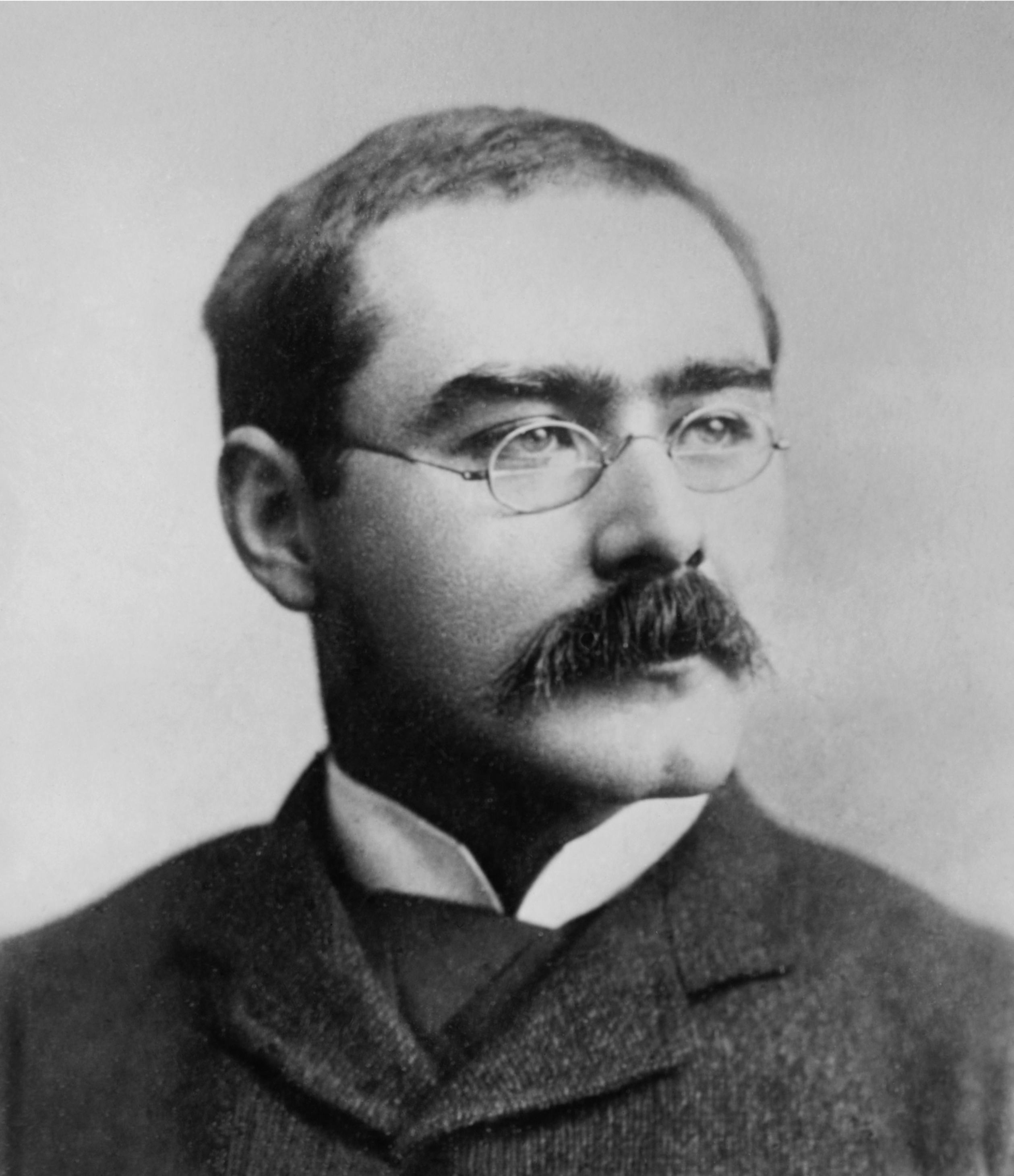
- Country: United Kingdom
- Language: English
- Genre: Short story

Publication

"Wireless" is a short story by Rudyard Kipling. It was first published in Scribner's Magazine in 1902, and was later collected in Traffics and Discoveries. The sister-poem accompanying it, Butterflies or Kaspar's Song in Varda, Kipling claimed to have been a translation of an old Swedish poem (from the Swedish of Stagnelius), although this claim is unsubstantiated.

== Plot ==
The narrator (Kipling) is visiting a chemist friend who is experimenting with radio. He is attempting to make contact with another enthusiast, several miles distant. They are passing a restless night, concocting the most marvelous cocktails from the chemicals at hand, and the narrator succeeds in drugging Mr Shaynor, the chemist’s assistant, who is suffering from last stage consumption.

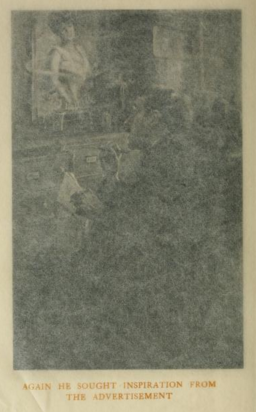
"Again he sought inspiration from the advertisement"

Shaynor has all the night been expressing his approval of a certain young lady in a toilet-water advertisement, and as he slips into a trance, he begins to recite poetry to her. To the narrator's surprise, he begins to compose a poem of Keats; instead of merely writing the lines, he is in all the agonies of composition, and occasionally, in Kipling's opinion, improving on the poet's own work. The poem is The Eve of St. Agnes; in one instance Shaynor takes the "trite" line

And threw warm gules on Madeline’s fair breast

(line 218) and changes it to

And threw warm gules on Madeline’s young breast

which Kipling considers a change for the better. It seems to him that by the atmosphere auspicious for radio contact, Shaynor has somehow managed to connect with Keats, and the lines he writes are "the raw material...whence Keats wove the twenty-sixth, seventh, and eighth stanzas of his poem."

== Criticism ==
J. M. S. Tompkins was critical of the story, saying it was "too full of crowded detail which, as it is structural, cannot be eliminated."

Author John Rhode later used the story as the inspiration for the plot of his 1929 detective novel The House on Tollard Ridge.
