= The Eve of St Agnes (painting) =

Painting by John Everett Millais

The Eve of Saint Agnes
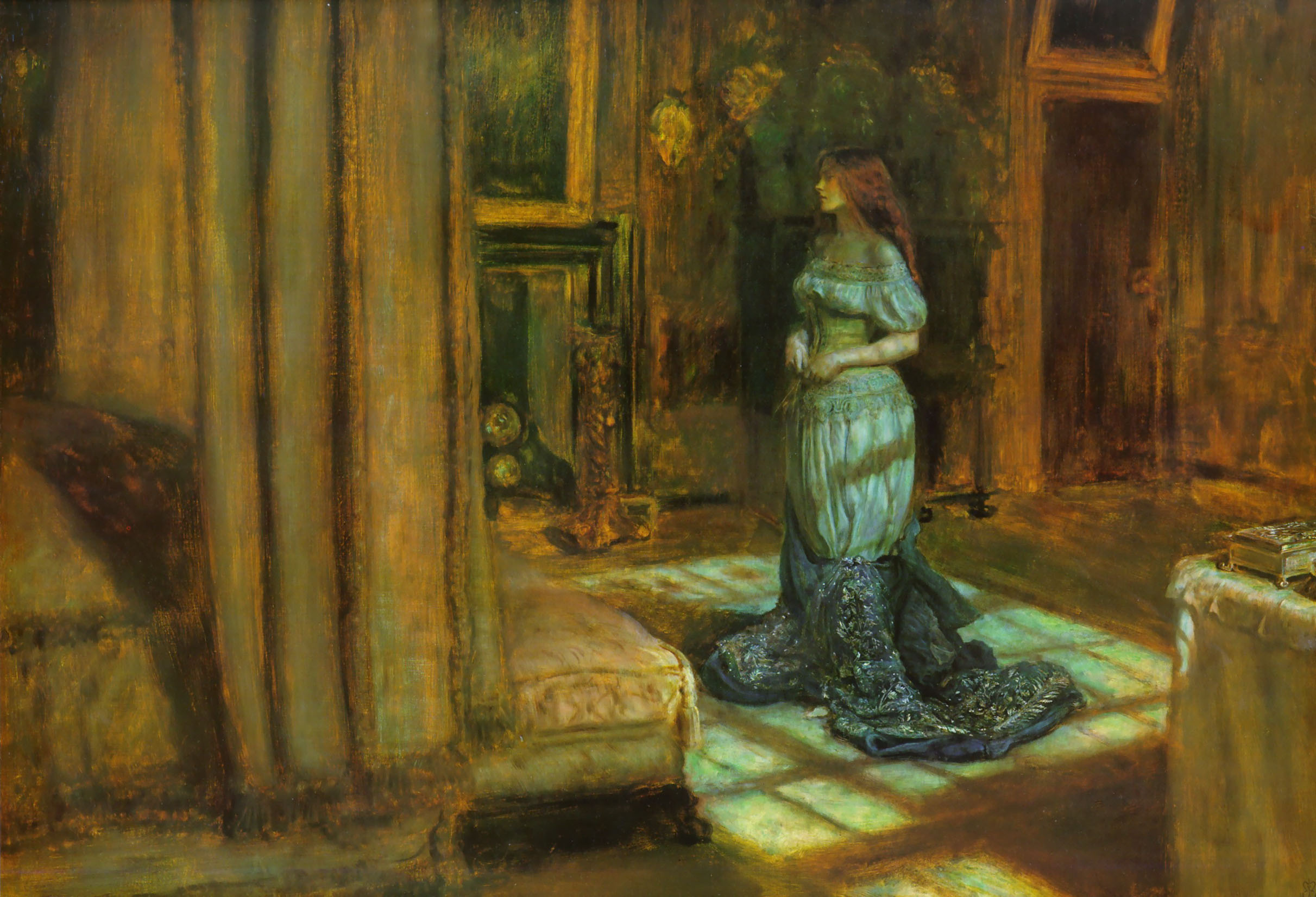
- Artist: John Everett Millais
- Year: 1863
- Type: Oil on canvas, genre painting
- Dimensions: 118.1 cm × 154.9 cm (46.5 in × 61.0 in)
- Location: Royal Collection

The Eve of St Agnes is an 1863 genre painting by the British artist John Everett Millais. It was inspired by the Romantic poet John Keats' 1819 poem of the same title, taking place the night before the feast day of Saint Agnes. The works of Keats were a popular source for painters associated with the Pre-Raphaelite Brotherhood. The model for the painting was Millais' wife, Effie.

Millais was elected to membership of the Royal Academy of Arts on the strength of this picture and My First Sermon. The picture was submitted to the Royal Academy Exhibition of 1863 at the National Gallery in London. The painting later came into the possession of the Royal Collection. A smaller watercolour version is in the Victoria and Albert in London.

== See also ==
- List of paintings by John Everett Millais

== Bibliography ==
- Gilmour, Robin. The Victorian Period: The Intellectual and Cultural Context of English Literature, 1830 - 1890. Taylor & Francis, 2014.
- Tanabe, Kumiko (ed.) The Interconnections Between Victorian Writers, Artists and Places. Cambridge Scholars Publishing, 2019.
