= The Eve of St. Agnes =

John Keats poem

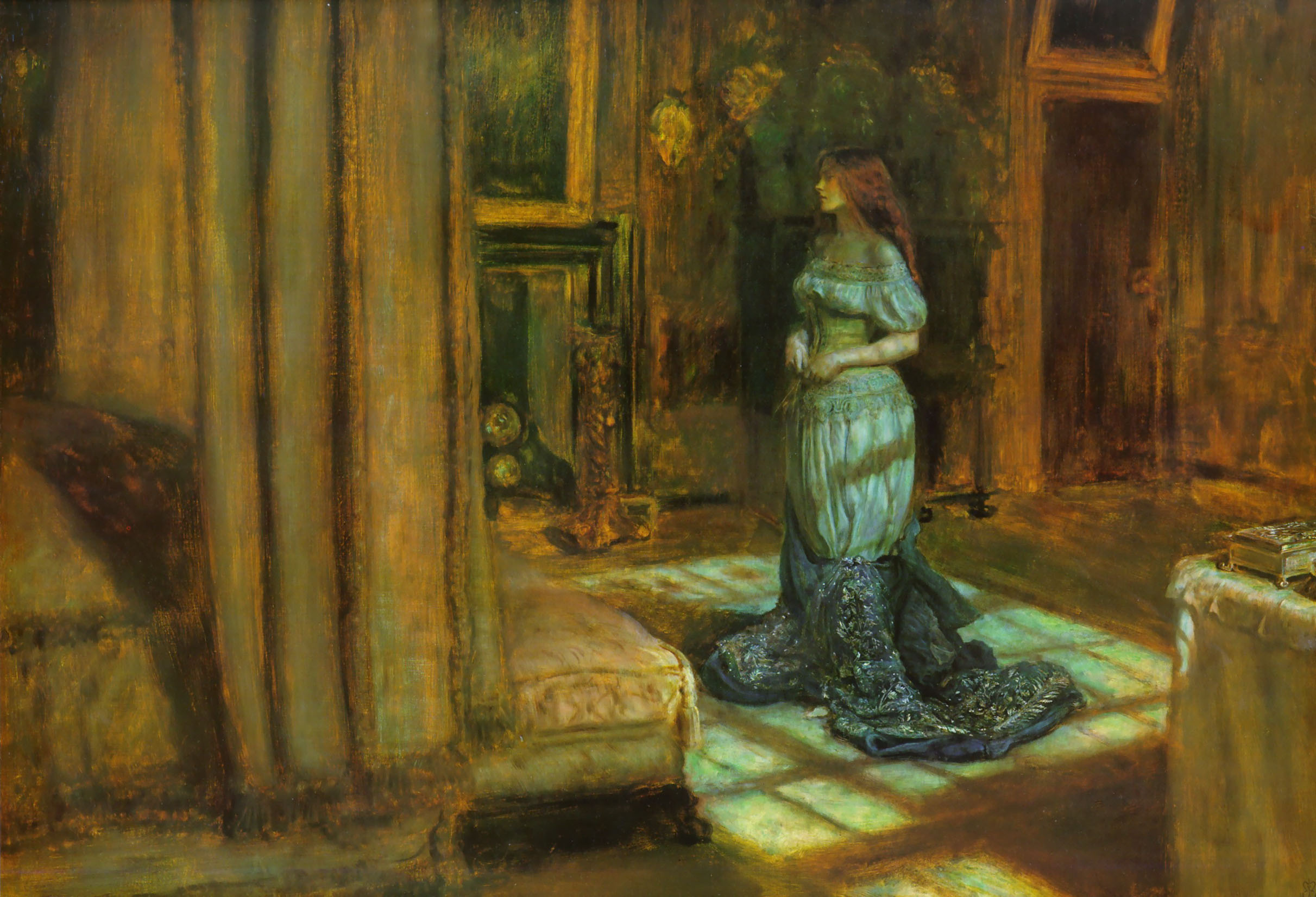
The Eve of St Agnes, John Everett Millais c. 1863

The Eve of St. Agnes is a Romantic narrative poem of 42 Spenserian stanzas set in the Middle Ages. It was written by John Keats in 1819 and published in Lamia, Isabella, The Eve of St. Agnes, and Other Poems (1820). The poem was considered by many of Keats's contemporaries and the succeeding Victorians to be one of his finest and influenced subsequent 19th-century literature.

The title comes from the day (or evening) before the feast of Saint Agnes (or St. Agnes' Eve). St. Agnes, the patron saint of virgins, died a martyr in 4th-century Rome. The eve falls on 20 January; the feast day on the 21st. The divinations Keats referred to in this poem were also referred to by John Aubrey in his Miscellanies (1696) as being associated with St. Agnes' night.

== Background ==
Keats based his poem on the folk belief that a girl could see her future husband in a dream if she performed certain rites on the eve of St. Agnes, namely if she would go to bed without any supper and transfer pins one by one from a pincushion to a sleeve while reciting the Lord's Prayer. Then her future husband would appear in her dream.

A Scottish version of the ritual would involve young women meeting together on St. Agnes's Eve at midnight; they would go, one by one, into a remote field and throw in some grain, after which they repeated the following rhyme in a prayer to St. Agnes: "Agnes sweet, and Agnes fair, Hither, hither, now repair; Bonny Agnes, let me see The lad who is to marry me."

Keats started writing this seminal work while staying in Chichester. He travelled to Chichester, probably arriving on St. Agnes' Eve, 20 January 1819. It is said that the medieval architecture of Chichester inspired the great hall and house where Madeline lived. A statue of Keats resides in Eastgate Square in Chichester to commemorate the fact he started this poem there. The statue was unveiled by Chichester-based actress Dame Patricia Routledge.

In the original version of his poem, Keats emphasised the young lovers' sexuality, but his publishers, who feared public reaction, forced him to tone down the eroticism.

== Plot ==
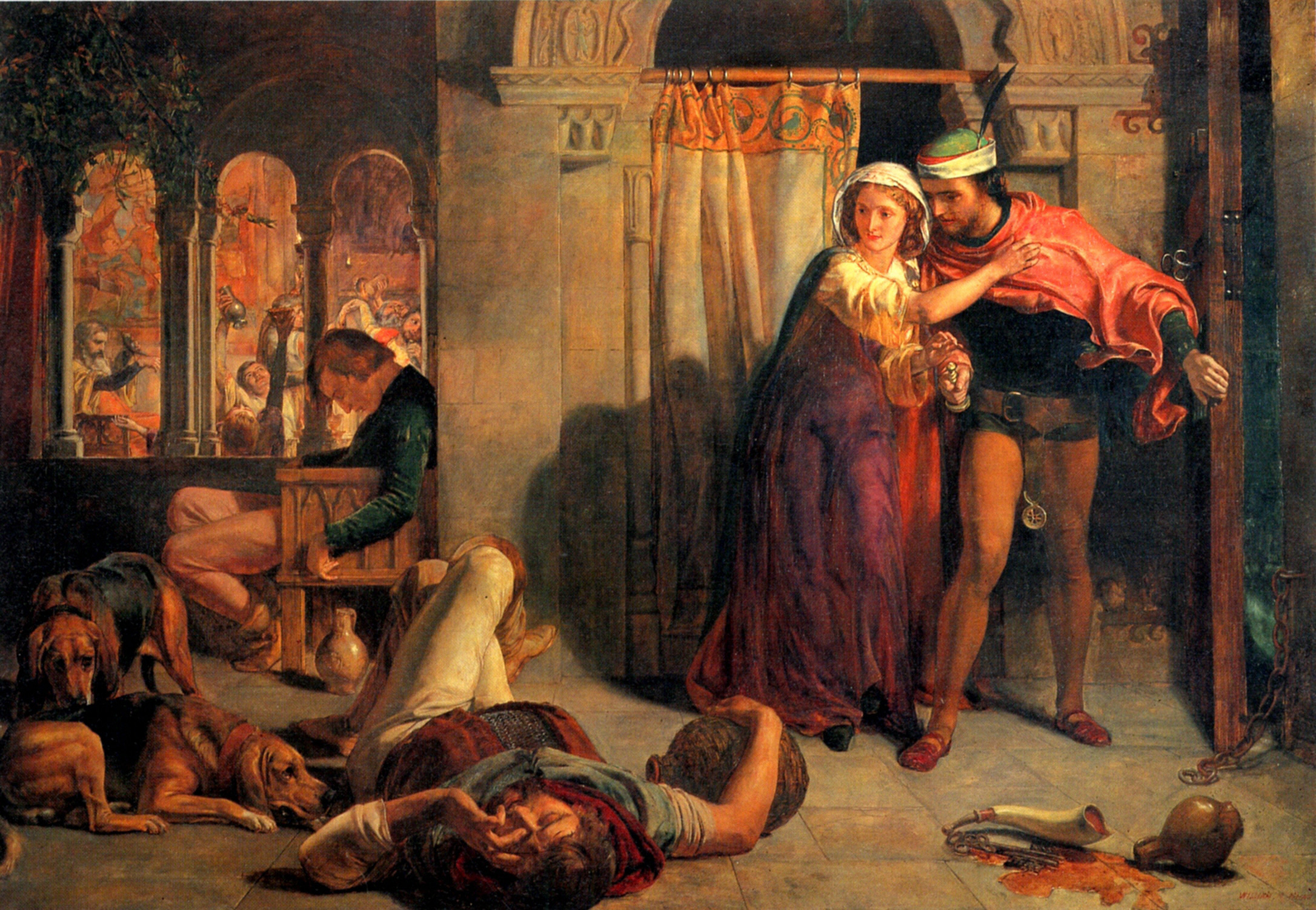
The Flight of Madeline and Porphyro, painting by William Holman Hunt

On a bitterly chill night, an elderly beadsman says his prayers in the chapel of the ancestral home of Madeline's family, where a loud party has begun. Madeline pines for the love of Porphyro, sworn enemy to her kin. She has heard 'old dames full many times declare' that she may receive sweet dreams of her lover if, on this night, St. Agnes' Eve, she retires to bed following the proper rituals.

Later that night, Porphyro makes his way to the castle and braves entry, seeking out Angela, an elderly woman friendly to his family, and importuning her to lead him to Madeline's room at night, where he may but gaze upon her sleeping form. Angela is persuaded only with difficulty, and first obtains some food from the banquet for them.

Concealed in an ornate, carved closet in Madeline's room, Porphyro watches as Madeline makes ready for bed. He creeps forth as she sleeps, to prepare a feast of rare delicacies. Madeline wakes and sees before her the same image she has seen in her dream and, thinking Porphyro part of it, receives him into her bed. Waking in full and realising her mistake, she tells Porphyro she cannot hate him for his deception since her heart is so much in his, but that if he goes now he leaves behind "A dove forlorn and lost / With sick unpruned wing".

Porphyro declares his love for Madeline and promises her a home with him over the southern moors. They flee from the castle, passing insensate, drunken revellers and rush into the night. Angela's death is revealed in the poem's final stanza and the beadsman, "after thousand aves told, / For aye unsought for slept among his ashes cold".

== Commentary ==
Written in the Gothic style, the poem reflects "many of the same concerns that Keats explores in his odes — imagination, dreaming and vision, and life as a mixture of opposites." In it, Keats blends a medieval legend with a tale of star-crossed lovers, as did Romeo and Juliet and the traditional French romance Floris and Blancheflour.

== Alluded to by others ==
- Rudyard Kipling's short story "Wireless" (1902) has the narrator witnessing a recreation of the poem by a man in a trance who, by virtue of the similarities of his situation to that of Keats (he is a consumptive apothecary's assistant), becomes "tuned" to the poet.
- H. P. Lovecraft's short story "The Outsider" features the final stanza of the poem as an epigraph.
- Harry Clarke's The Eve of St. Agnes is a stained glass masterpiece inspired by the poem.
- Robert Hunter's The Silver Snarling Trumpet: The Birth of the Grateful Dead (2024 [1962]) takes its title from the fourth stanza of Keats's poem.
