= Birchbox =

Beauty product subscription box service

Birchbox, Inc.
- Industry: Cosmetics
- Founded: 2010; 16 years ago
- Founders: Katia Beauchamp; Hayley Barna
- Headquarters: New York City, New York, U.S.
- Owner: Independent (2010–21); FemTec (2021–23); Retention Brands (2023–present)
- Website: birchbox.com

Birchbox is a New York City-based online monthly subscription service that sends its subscribers a box of four to five selected samples of makeup or other beauty-related products. The products include skincare items, perfumes, organic-based products, and various other cosmetics.

Since 2023, it has been owned by Retention Brands.

== History ==
Birchbox was established in September 2010 by Katia Beauchamp and Hayley Barna, both graduates of Harvard Business School. In October 2010, Birchbox's initial funding began with $1.4 million in seed funding from investors including First Round and Accel Partners.

In August 2011, Birchbox received $10.5 million in Series A Funding. In April 2014, it raised $60 million in Series B funding, led by Viking Global Investors, and saw participation from First Round Capital, Accel Partners, Aspect Partners, and Consigliere Brand Capital.

In July 2014, the company opened its first brick-and-mortar store in New York's Soho neighborhood. As of 2014, Birchbox was valued at $485 million. In October, it partnered with Soldsie to launch its first Instagram shop. The shop allows Instagram users interested in Birchbox products to purchase directly through Instagram by leaving a comment on a photo with the hashtag #birchboxcart.

In 2015, Barna stepped down from the co-CEO role at the company and joined the First Round Capital firm as a venture partner. In January 2016, the company cut 15% of its staff.

Five months after raising $90 million, it had a minority stake acquired in October 2018 by Walgreens, whose stores began offering its service. However, Birchbox cut 70% of its staff of 230 employees in January 2020.

After being purchased by start-up FemTec for $45 million in October 2021, the online subscription service was acquired in 2023 by Retention Brands.

== Business ==
As of Jan 2021, Birchbox has 300 thousand subscribers and 500 thousand active customers. Birchbox's incentive is that the consumer will choose to purchase the full-sized product of whatever sample they've grown to like from the Birchbox website afterward. As of 2021, about 5% of box subscribers went on to make full-size purchases.

After subscribing, the customer takes a "beauty profile" survey that aims to customize their future selections to suit their preferences better.

== See also ==
- Online Retail
