= It Girls =

2002 American television film

- Directed by: Robin Melanie Leacock
- Country of origin: United States
- Original language: English

Original release
- Network: We TV
- Release: April 2002

It Girls is a feature documentary film directed by Robin Melanie Leacock that aired on the Women's Entertainment channel on April 2 and 7 2002. It features wealthy socialites including Casey Johnson, Elisabeth Kieselstein-Cord and Nicky Hilton, as well as appearances by Diane Von Furstenberg, Marisa Berenson and other women. It was filmed in Manhattan during New York Fashion Week. The film's premise is that anyone can be an it girl. In the documentary, von Furstenberg says "It's really about being a forever girl!"

== Critical response ==
Roger Friedman, writing for Fox News, said that this was a "numbingly mesmerizing documentary" in which "You have rarely seen such a collection of vacuous and tiresome people". He complains that "the 'It Girls' of 2002... are an inarticulate and alarming lot of long legged blondes without a thought in their heads".

Mary Robbins, in the New York Times, wrote that the film suffered from poor timing, because the bad economic conditions at the time had "made expensive parties, and girls who were famous for nothing, less and less appealing."

A reviewer for the Baltimore Sun wrote: "As if high school social castes weren't traumatic enough. This "documentary" allegedly attempts to explore the new It Girl, but really reminds us that the hierarchy we like to think we left behind in high school is alive and kicking in the adult world." and "Even with its occasional snarky snippets, the show can be hard to endure for those of us among the proletariat. But after a while, the documentary begins to resemble a drama, and the Hilton girls and their beautiful friends become mere characters in a nouveau Restoration comedy -- School for Scandal meets Page Six."
