= Bach Buquen =

French influencer and model (born 2006)

Bách Buquen
- Born: Bách Buquen; 2 March 2006 (age 20); Paris, France
- Occupations: Influencer; model; actor

Instagram information
- Page: Bách
- Followers: 4.4 million

TikTok information
- Page: bách
- Years active: 2021–present
- Genres: Get Ready With Me; dance
- Followers: 10 million
- Last updated: 25 October 2025

Bách Buquen (born March 2, 2006) is a French influencer, model and actor. He rose to popularity in 2024 for his TikTok videos of him putting on makeup in public.

== Early life and career ==
Buquen was born and raised in the 6th arrondissement of Paris, and is of French-Vietnamese descent. His mother is a former actress and he was a ballet dancer for seven years.

Prior to posting makeup videos, Buquen posted dance challenge, "Get Ready With Me" (GRWM), and calisthenics videos on TikTok. In the summer of 2024, Buquen posted six TikTok videos of himself applying makeup in public as passersby reacted behind him, mostly filmed in the Gare Saint-Lazare and each set to the Charli XCX song "Guess", in what he described as an effort to "normalize makeup for men". The videos went viral online, with one video receiving more than 31 million views, and brought him to wider popularity internationally. By December 2024, he had more than eight million followers on TikTok and more than four and a half million on Instagram. Buquen relocated to New York City at the beginning of 2025. He modeled for Dsquared²'s Icon New Generation SS25 campaign in March 2025. He is known for his collaborations with Mujer de Buena Pasta, Carlos Alberto, Anna Maylgon, and Bb Trickz.

He is set to make his acting debut in 2027 in the French Amazon Prime original movie 'Storm' ("Tempête"), where he'll portray the main character, Erwan.

== Public image ==
Alex Reimer of Queerty wrote in 2024 that Buquen's "hyper-masc image" set him apart from other male beauty influencers such as James Charles and field hockey international player Davis Atkin, while Charlie Kolbrener of V wrote the following year that his makeup videos "positioned him as a harbinger of a new kind of masculinity". Some social media users accused him in 2024 of stealing the concept of his makeup videos from queer beauty influencers, with Erin Docherty of Mamamia writing that his public GRWM videos were "strikingly similar" to those of fellow French beauty influencer Arthur Garros. Vanity Fair France and The Business of Fashion both described Buquen as a TikTok "it boy".

== Filmography ==
• Tempête (2027) directed by Edouard Salier
