= Celestine Maddy =

- Occupations: Author, environmentalist, and publisher
- Known for: Founder of Wilder Quarterly magazine & co-author of Wilder Life

Celestine Maddy is an American, author, environmentalist, and publisher. She is the founder of Wilder Quarterly magazine and co-author of A Wilder Life with Abbye Churchill.

== Career ==
After completing high school in 1996 at the age of 18, Maddy chose to not attend college and instead applied for writing positions at publications including Vice and High Times, while also having jobs at restaurants on the side for income. She later received an advertising position at StrawberryFrog. She later received a position as "Circulation Director" for the New York independent magazine Paper in 2004. By 2008, she had created her own ad blog named Agency Spy that was later purchased by Adweek. In 2011, Maddy founded the magazine Wilder Quarterly and co-authored a book about the experience in 2016 with Abbye Churchill titled A Wilder Life. She was recognized on Fast Company’s Most Creative People list in 2012.

=== Executive positions ===
Maddy has been an executive in advertising and technology for the last 20 years. She was the Head of Global Brand and Consumer Marketing at Pinterest. She served as co-CEO of The Wing. She also served as the VP of Marketing for Reddit and Foursquare. She is now the managing director of Communications and Marketing for Laurene Powell Jobs’s, Emerson Collective.

== Awards and honors ==
- 2012 – Named one of Fast Company's 100 Most Creative List in 2012
- 2014 – Named one of the Fast Companhy's Most Creative People in Business 1000: The Complete List
- 2015 – won a Cannes Lion as a planner with UK agency Dare for Sony Ericsson
