= Lyoness =

Multi-level marketing company

Lyoness International AG
- Type: Private
- Industry: Multi-level marketing
- Founded: 2003
- Founders: Iwan J. Ackermann, Max Meienberg, Uwe Proch
- Headquarters: Graz, Austria
- Key people: Radovan Vitosevic (CEO), Marko Sedovnik (President of the Board), Dipl.-Ing. Herbert Paierl (CSB)
- Owner: Hubert Freidl, Marko Sedovnik and Sharif Omar
- Number of employees: 600+

Lyoness International AG was a multi-level marketing company established in Austria in 2003. According to Lyoness, the company was active in more than 40 countries, spread over six continents, and their shopping community consisted of more than five million members as of 2016. In several countries Lyoness is suspected as being, or ruled as being, a pyramid scheme.

In 2023, Lyoness International AG and Lyoness Europe AG, which served as umbrella companies for the Lyoness business model, filed for insolvency. The company was succeeded by MyWorld International AG. The Lyoness name continues to be used in legal, financial, and structural contexts in several markets.

== Business model ==
Lyoness was founded in Switzerland in 2003 as a shopping community that offered a loyalty program combining cashback rewards with member-based participation. Members could receive benefits from purchases made at participating partner merchants. The model also included referral-based incentives, where members could introduce others to the platform and potentially earn commissions tied to their network's activity.

The company later expanded its services to include various marketing tools for partner businesses, aiming to increase consumer engagement and retention. This included features such as loyalty cards, promotional campaigns, and access to a global shopping community. Businesses participating in the program were typically charged fees based on the performance or volume of transactions generated through the platform.

== Previous corporate structure ==
In 2004, the CEO of Lyoness, Hubert Freidl, was hired as the company's director. Lyoness comprises at least seven corporations registered in Switzerland, nine corporations registered in Austria and approximately 42 additional national and regional corporations all around the globe. The name "Lyoness" was derived from the Celtic mythological kingdom "Lyonesse".

=== Continental and country organisation ===
The continental organisations are subsidiaries of Lyoness International AG and are registered as stock corporations. These are: Lyoness Europe AG (founded in 2003), "Lyoness IMEA S.A." (2009), Lyoness North America Ltd., "Lyoness South America S.A.", "Lyoness Asia Ltd." (2011).

The country offices are subsidiaries of the continental stock corporations and are registered as privately owned, limited-liability companies.

== Social involvement ==
According to Lyoness, every purchase made by its members at its partner companies benefits the Child and Family Foundation (a charity organisation) and the Greenfinity Foundation (an organisation promoting sustainability).

In 2012, Lyoness announced that it and its affiliated Greenfinity foundation would be the title sponsors of the Austrian Open golf tournament for three seasons, through to 2014. Lyoness also sponsored the ‘European Juniors League’, a European football competition for youth teams, as well as Austrian club SK Rapid Wien. Lyoness announced that it would pay 9 million euros over 5 soccer seasons but would not be the main sponsor of Rapid Wien.

== Legality and alleged deceptive practices ==
One year after Lyoness was founded, in 2004, the Austrian criminal police (Kriminalpolizei) published an article in the December issue of its organisation’s magazine, in which it warned of the resurfacing of Ponzi schemes and pyramid schemes in Austria. Lyoness was explicitly mentioned in this article. The company contested the allegations publicly. In 2005, Austrian Parliament member, Johann Maier (SPÖ) asked the then-incumbent Austrian Minister of Justice (Karin Miklautsch, BZÖ) parliamentary questions about the reports filed against alleged pyramid schemes in Austria in 2004. Lyoness was one of the organisations complaints were filed against.

In 2008, the Austrian Chamber of Labour (‘Arbeiterkammer’) of Steiermark issued a warning against Lyoness, listing its alleged privacy violations, misleading advertising, deceptive information and unrealistic and negligible benefits as red flags for doing business with Lyoness.

In March 2010, the Swiss magazine Beobachter published an article by Pascale Hofmeier entitled "Lyoness: Hands off". In the article, Sara Stalder of the Swiss Consumer Union and Manuel Richard of the Swiss Gambling Commission warn consumers not to do business with Lyoness. In early 2012, Kleine Zeitung published an article suggesting that Lyoness deceived the masses by operating an irrelevant shopping community. L'Hebdo, a Swiss magazine, reproduced a story about how Lyoness members are told that an investment of 3,000 CHF will eventually lead to 25,000 CHF in return, if enough new, down-paying members are recruited.

In February 2012, the Beobachter published an article stating that, based on review of internal Lyoness communication, members are offered ‘bounties’ up to 45,000 CHF to provide ‘relevant information’ on Lyoness’ critics. A critic from Zürich was reported to have been sued for over 1 million CHF for ‘defamation’ after he contacted Lyoness’ partner companies in Switzerland in an attempt to explain the business model of Lyoness to them. The article also reported that the Lyoness business model seems to revolve around recruiting activities instead of discounts and that Lyoness is internationally charged with forgery, fraud and hosting a pyramid scheme.

Der Standard reported in July 2012 that the Austrian Economic and Corruption Prosecutor (‘WKStA’) has been granted jurisdiction to investigate and prosecute Lyoness in Austria. The Swiss Handelszeitung mentioned a court case Lyoness lost, which revolved around the question as to whether the company should have issued a financial prospectus before asking investors to finance their advertising campaigns in foreign markets. In September 2012, the same newspaper reported that major, alleged Lyoness partners in Switzerland (Microsoft and Kuoni Travel) were deciding not to continue the partnerships, if there were any to begin with. The Wiener Zeitung reported about a pending lawsuit initiated by the Austrian Consumer Organisation ‘VKI’ in March 2013. The VKI contested 61 clauses of Lyoness’ ‘General Terms and Conditions’, which it called opaque, uncertain, and/or meaningless. Eric Breiteneder, hired as a legal representative by the organisation, also referred to the concepts used to distinguish various parts of – and benefits within the Lyoness business model as vague and/or undefined elsewhere.

The Handelszeitung reported about suspicions that high-level Lyoness members were earlier involved in (other) pyramid schemes, like the ‘Spirit of Independence’. It also mentioned a system called ‘GTS’ (Global Trade System), operated by Erin Trade SA, as a former organisation tied to Hubert Freidl. Like Lyoness, this company has been called a pyramid scheme in the public debate. The Kleine Zeitung reported that various experts were looking at the investment schemes for advertising campaigns organised by Lyoness, and whether a prospectus was required before attracting capital from investors. Lyoness-hired professor Susanne Kalls concluded that no capital market regulations were violated by not issuing a prospectus; attorney Karl Hengstberger came to the opposite conclusion but agreed with Kalls that the Lyoness business package does not constitute an investment. In the same article, Lyoness spokesman Mathias Vorbach admits that the company may have had some trouble before, but that those days are behind it – Lyoness has learned from its mistakes. He asserts that legal problems have only appeared in Austria (a contested claim) and that 95% of the Lyoness members just shop and do not participate in the earning models offered by Lyoness. However, the Beobachter, after reportedly considering internal Lyoness documents, published an article suggesting that 99.7% of the Lyoness turnover derives from down-payments on future purchases, not from actual shopping or (saved up) discounts.

In September 2009, Lyoness hired criminal law expert Peter Lewisch to assess whether the company's business model violated the Austrian law concerning illegal pyramid schemes. The study, conducted by Lewisch in September 2013, argued that Lyoness is not a pyramid scheme under Austrian legislation. The judges of the regional court in Krems, Austria, however concluded that the business model of Lyoness is so "Ponzi-Scheme-like", that contracts between the company and its business partners are not valid. Lyoness has been declared a pyramid scheme by at least four independent civil courts in Austria. Additionally it was reported that the Austrian Consumers Union has filed suit against Lyoness for providing participants with unclear and deceptive terms and conditions. VKI represented clients who contended they invested money in the advertising campaigns organised by Lyoness, and several option trading packages offered by Lyoness, but were not provided with a prospectus. VKI won their case against Lyoness and the court ruled that the 61 contested clauses are indeed unlawful, making the contracts between Lyoness and its premium members not legally binding under Austrian law. Further civil proceedings have been combined into a class-action lawsuit worth millions of euros, initiated by process financier Advofin, and supported and recommended by the Austrian Consumers Union (VKI). The lawsuit will be filed in Amsterdam.

Lyoness is suspected to be a pyramid scheme in several of the countries it operates in. In its homeland Austria, Lyoness has been declared a pyramid scheme by four independent civil courts. Criminal investigations have also been concluded by the Austrian Economic and Corruption Prosecutor ("WKStA"), who maintains that Lyoness operates an illegal pyramid scheme. Lyoness expects to be cleared of all charges. In Australia, Lyoness was under prosecution by the Australian Competition & Consumer Commission (ACCC) for operating an illegal pyramid scheme. The trial has ended and the judgment was reserved. In Sweden, the responsible authority concluded that Lyoness is a pyramid scheme and reported Lyoness to the Stockholm police. While initially halted, an appeal by the Gaming Board led to a continuation of the investigation by the Stockholm Police. In Poland, France, Hungary and Lithuania, similar investigations have been conducted or are ongoing. In Greece, the Austrian Lyoness directors have been accused of various types of fraud by the local authorities. Lyoness vehemently denies all allegations.

In October 2015, the Federal Court of Australia found that the loyalty program was not a pyramid scheme as the ACCC had originally claimed. The latest decision in Austria also declared that Lyoness is not classified as fraud or any illegal pyramid scheme by the Austrian Economic and Corruption Prosecutor ("WKStA"). In April 2016, the Vienna Regional Court stated that Lyoness is not a pyramid scheme. This decision is legally binding and can no longer be subject to appeal.

In Australia, The ACCC, after researching Lyoness for a while, instituted proceedings against Lyoness International AG, Lyoness Asia Limited, Lyoness UK Limited and Lyoness Australia Pty Limited (together ‘Lyoness’) for operating a pyramid selling scheme and engaging in referral selling. The ACCC alleges that Lyoness has operated the scheme in Australia from mid-2011 and that it continues to operate the scheme. The scheme offers ‘cash back’ rebates to members who shop through a Lyoness portal, use Lyoness vouchers or present their Lyoness card at certain retailers. Whilst cash back offers themselves are not prohibited by the Australian Consumer Law, the ACCC alleges that the Lyoness scheme also offers commissions to members who recruit new members who make a down payment on future shopping. The ACCC is seeking declarations, pecuniary penalties, injunctions, an order requiring the Lyoness website to link to the case report and costs. As Lyoness International AG, Lyoness Asia Limited and Lyoness UK Limited are located overseas, the ACCC will be making arrangements for service on those entities. The case is before Justice Flick of the Federal Court in Sydney. Lyoness have submitted their defence in October 2014, and the next hearing will be in February 2015. Australian victims claim to have lost thousands of dollars each to Lyoness. The trial has ended and the judgment was reserved. In Greece, an arrest warrant was issued in August 2015 against the Austrian directors of Lyoness Greece. On the 10th of August 2015 the Prosecutor of Thessaloniki Court of First Instance issued an arrest warrant against Herbert Teissel and his wife Anna Teissel, alleged directors of Lyoness Greece, for attempted fraud. Lyoness vehemently denies all allegations.

In January 2019, Italy’s Competition Authority (AGCM) ruled that the Lyoness cashback formula, which promises a percentage refund of the money spent by consumers shopping at the company’s affiliated retailers, is an unfair and deceptive commercial practice that constitutes a pyramid scheme according to the Italian Consumer Code, and imposed a penalty of €3,200,000 against the company.

== Television ==
On November 30, 2011, Dragons’ Den Canada aired an episode featuring the pitch of the Lyoness ‘Premium Member’ Andy Nyakas from Brampton, Ontario, asking the ‘Dragons’ to jointly invest CDN$175,000 to acquire Lyoness ‘business packages’ through him. None of the Dragons were willing to invest. Instead, they ridiculed him and his business idea, suggesting that it's 'distasteful', and 'a pyramid scheme’. Robert Herjavec also advised Nyakas, who borrowed against his house to acquire Lyoness positions, not to invest any more money in the Lyoness system.

Another television show that has reported on Lyoness is the Austrian public television program ORF Report. This programme aired episodes under the names ‘Lyoness - The money machine’ (November 13, 2012), 'Shopping Community Lyoness' (November27th, 2013) and ‘The man behind Lyoness’ (April 24, 2013), interviewing experts and former participants, which both say that Lyoness operates a pyramid scheme behind the façade of a ‘shopping community’. The latter episode also features hidden camera footage of Hubert Freidl telling his followers that spreading ‘Cashback Cards’ is irrelevant – ‘it is all about the positions, positions, positions, positions’.

== Income ==
From a Lyoness income disclosure statement can be derived that the average Lyoness member in the United States receives a gross annual commission of approximately $275, or $23 per month. The monthly median commission value of $0.38 indicates that the vast majority of the members receives a lower commission than the 23 dollar monthly average.

Additionally, the document states that 46% of the Lyoness members makes $0 in commission and that the average annual expenditures, not taken into account when calculating the average commission, are $1,294. Similar figures have been reported in 2013, and in Canada.

== Internet ==
On the Internet, various websites and blogs from all over the world have focused critical attention on Lyoness, accusing the company of illegal business practices (mainly of running pyramid and Ponzi schemes) and questioning the alleged partnerships between Lyoness and several multinational corporations, as well as the validity and relevance of the certificates granted to the Lyoness shopping community. In April 2013, it was reported that former (Austrian) participants of Lyoness had organised themselves and founded an organisation and website called Plattform Lyoness. Not much later, an international equivalent was established under the name Lyoness Complaint Centre.

In the beginning of June 2013, it was reported that Lyoness filed legal complaints against the founders of Plattform Lyoness. The founders were forced to remove legal documents concerning Lyoness from their website. Plattform Lyoness has reported that a preliminary injunction in a subsequent court case forced Plattform Lyoness to change its domain name from www.plattform-lyoness.at to www.lyoness-geschaedigte-plattform.at, as the court found that domain names linking to negative content about Lyoness should carry a distinctive term to indicate that the domain is not hosted by Lyoness itself. Plattform Lyoness solved this by adding the term 'geschaedigte', which is the German word for 'victims'. Lyoness' other demands were not granted by the court.

In August 2015, two former employees were acquitted in Austria on charges of fraud and money laundering.
