= Social commerce =

E-commerce involving social media

Social commerce is a subset of electronic commerce that involves social media and online media that supports social interaction, and user contributions to assist online buying and selling of products and services.

More succinctly, social commerce is the use of social network(s), and user-generated content in the context of e-commerce transactions.

The term social commerce was introduced by Yahoo! in November 2005 which describes a set of online collaborative shopping tools such as shared pick lists, user ratings and other user-generated content of online product information and advice.

The concept of social commerce was developed by David Beisel to denote user-generated advertorial content on e-commerce sites, and by Steve Rubel to include collaborative e-commerce tools that enable shoppers "to get advice from trusted individuals, find goods and services and then purchase them". The social networks that spread this advice have been found to increase the customer's trust in one retailer over another.

Social commerce may assist companies in achieving the following purposes: Firstly, social commerce helps companies engage customers with their brands according to the customers' social behaviors. Secondly, it provides an incentive for customers to return to their website. Thirdly, it provides customers with a platform to talk about their brand on their website. Fourthly, it provides all the information customers need to research, compare, and ultimately choose you over your competitor, thus purchasing from you and not others.

In these days, the range of social commerce has been expanded to include social media tools and content used in the context of e-commerce, especially in the fashion industry. Examples of social commerce include customer ratings and reviews, user recommendations and referrals, social shopping tools (sharing the act of shopping online), forums and communities, social media optimization, social applications and social advertising. Technologies such as augmented reality have also been integrated with social commerce, allowing shoppers to visualize apparel items on themselves and solicit feedback through social media tools.

Some academics have sought to distinguish "social commerce" from "social shopping", with the former being referred to as collaborative networks of online vendors; the latter, the collaborative activity of online shoppers.

== Timeline ==
- 2005: The term "social commerce" was first introduced on Yahoo! in 2005.
- 2020: In 2020, Facebook launched Facebook Shops which allowed users to create digital storefronts on Facebook and Instagram where product discovery was possible through social content browsing.
- 2021: The Global Web Index associated one's use of social media to his/her eagerness to buy. Social media with its entertaining and inspirational content can increase a product's profitability. This explains why Instagram expanded its Checkout feature to similar content like IG Stories, IGTV, and Reels.

== Elements ==
The attraction and effectiveness of Social Commerce can be understood in terms of Robert Cialdini's Principles of InfluenceInfluence: Science and Practice":

1. Reciprocity – When a company gives a person something for free, that person will feel the need to return the favor, whether by buying again or giving good recommendations for the company.
2. Community – When people find an individual or a group that shares the same values, likes, beliefs, etc., they find community. People are more committed to a community that they feel accepted within. When this commitment happens, they tend to follow the same trends as a group and when one member introduces a new idea or product, it is accepted more readily based on the previous trust that has been established. It would be beneficial for companies to develop partnerships with social media sites to engage social communities with their products.
3. Social proof – To receive positive feedback, a company needs to be willing to accept social feedback and to show proof that other people are buying, and like, the same things that I like. This can be seen in a lot of online companies such as eBay and Amazon, that allow public feedback of products and when a purchase is made, they immediately generate a list showing purchases that other people have made in relation to my recent purchase. It is beneficial to encourage open recommendation and feedback. This creates trust for you as a seller. 55% of buyers turn to social media when they're looking for information.
4. Authority – Many people need proof that a product is of good quality. This proof can be based on the recommendations of others who have bought the same product. If there are many user reviews about a product, then a consumer will be more willing to trust their own decision to buy this item.
5. Liking – People trust based on the recommendations of others. If there are a lot of "likes" of a particular product, then the consumer will feel more confident and justified in making this purchase.
6. Scarcity – As part of supply and demand, a greater value is assigned to products that are regarded as either being in high demand or are seen as being in a shortage. Therefore, if a person is convinced that they are purchasing something that is unique, special, or not easy to acquire, they will have more of a willingness to make a purchase. If there is trust established from the seller, they will want to buy these items immediately. This can be seen in the cases of Zara and Apple Inc. who create demand for their products by convincing the public that there is a possibility of missing out on being able to purchase them.

== Types ==
=== Onsite ===
Onsite social commerce refers to retailers including social sharing and other social functionality on their website. Some notable examples include Zazzle which enables users to share their purchases, Macy's which allows users to create a poll to find the right product, and Fab.com which shows a live feed of what other shoppers are buying. Onsite user reviews are also considered a part of social commerce. This approach has been successful in improving customer engagement, conversion and word-of-mouth branding according to several industry sources. Other examples include Alibaba, which uses different forms of social commerce, including Taobao chat groups where users can discuss products they have purchased, share recommendations, and organize collective group purchases.The platform combines shopping with other features that encourage buyers to stay in the app. Other platforms like AliExpress, Amazon, and Walmart have recruited influencers to promote products in videos and social-media posts that use commission-based links that connect content directly to purchase.

=== Offsite ===
Offsite social commerce includes activities that happen outside of the retailers' website. This may include posting products on social networks such as Facebook, X, and TikTok. It may also include advertising on shopping forums such as SlickDeals, Red Flag Deals, and LatestDeals.co.uk. Another example of offline social commerce are B2B trade fair like the one Alibaba.com held in 2025 in Las Vegas called CoCreate.This included livestreaming from the trade shows that connected buyers with wholesalers.

== Measurements ==
Social commerce can be measured by any of the principle ways to measure social media.

1. Return on Investment: measures the effect or action of social media on sales.
2. Reputation: indices measure the influence of social media investment in terms of changes to online reputation – made up of the volume and valence of social media mentions.
3. Reach: metrics use traditional media advertising metrics to measure the exposure rates and levels of an audience with social media.

== Business applications ==
This category is based on individuals' shopping, selling, recommending behaviors.

1. Social network-driven sales (Soldsie) – Facebook commerce and Twitter commerce belong to this part. Sales take place on established social network sites.
2. Peer-to-peer sales platforms (eBay, Etsy, Amazon) – In these websites, users can directly communicate and sell products to other users.
3. Group buying (Groupon, LivingSocial) – Users can buy products or services at a lower price when enough users agree to make this purchase.
4. Peer recommendations and reviews (Amazon, Yelp, Bazaarvoice) – Users can see recommendations and reviews from other users.
5. User-curated shopping (The Fancy, Lyst) – Users create and share lists of products and services for others to shop from.
6. Participatory commerce (Betabrand, Threadless, Kickstarter) – Users can get involved in the production process.
7. Social shopping (Squadded) – Allowing e-commerce to provide their users live chat sessions and shared shopping lists so they can communicate with their friends or other shoppers for advice.

== Business examples ==
Here are some notable business examples of Social Commerce:

- Betabrand: an online brand using participatory design to release new, community-created ideas every week.
- Cafepress: an online retailer of stock and user-customized on demand products.
- Etsy: an e-commerce website focused on handmade or vintage items and supplies, as well as unique factory-manufactured items under Etsy's new guidelines.
- Eventbrite: an online ticketing service that allows event organizers to plan, set up ticket sales and promote events (event management) and publish them across Facebook, Twitter and other social-networking tools directly from the site's interface.
- Groupon: a deal-of-the-day website that features discounted gift certificates usable at local or national companies.
- Houzz: a web site and online community about architecture, interior design and decorating, landscape design and home improvement.
- LivingSocial: an online marketplace that allows clients to buy and share things to do in their city.
- Lockerz: an international social commerce website based in Seattle, Washington.
- OpenSky: is a registered trademark of Harris Corporation and is the trade name for a wireless communication system, invented by M/A-COM Inc., that is now a division of Harris RF Communications.
- Pinterest: a web and mobile application company that offers a visual discovery, collection, sharing, and storage tool.
- Polyvore: a community powered social commerce website. Members curate products into a shared product index and use them to create image collages called "Sets".
- SlickDeals: a shopping forum where members post the best deals for each other, and brands advertise exclusive offers. Based in the United States.
- Solavei: a social commerce network offering contract-free mobile service in the United States.

=== Facebook commerce (f-commerce) ===
Facebook commerce, f-commerce, and f-comm refer to the buying and selling of goods or services through Facebook, either through Facebook directly or through the Facebook Open Graph. Until March 2010, 1.5 million businesses had pages on Facebook which were built by Facebook Markup Language (FBML). A year later, in March 2011, Facebook deprecated FBML and adopted iframes. This allowed developers to gather more information about their Facebook visitors.

== History ==
The "2011 Social Commerce Study" estimated that 42% of online consumers had "followed" a retailer proactively through Facebook, Twitter or the retailer's blog, and that a full one-third of shoppers said they would be likely to make a purchase directly from Facebook (35%) or Twitter (32%).

== Influencer marketing ==
Micro-influencers are designers, photographers, writers, athletes, bohemian world-wanderers, professors, or any professional who could authentically channel things that speak about a brand. It is clear that these channels have fewer followers than the average celebrity accounts, most of the time they have less than 10,000 followers (according to Georgia Hatton from Social Media Today), but the quality of the audiences tends to be better, with a higher potential for like-minded tight-knit community of shoppers eager to take recommendations from one another. This topic has been also discussed by many other organizations such as Adweek, Medium, Forbes, Brand24, and many others.

== See also ==
- Referral marketing
- Web 2.0
