= Solavei =

Defunct American multi-level marketing company

- Type: Private
- Industry: Social commerce
- Founded: Bellevue, Washington(February 1, 2012)
- Founder: Ryan Wuerch
- Defunct: December 4, 2015
- Headquarters: Bellevue
- Number of locations: 1
- Area served: United States, including Puerto Rico
- Key people: Ryan Wuerch (Founder, CEO); Rick White (Head of Legal and Policy)
- Products: Social-based mobile virtual network operator
- Number of employees: 140

Solavei was a social commerce network offering contract-free mobile service in the United States, known for its use of incentivized referral plans and its social network advertising program. In addition to its mobile phone services, Solavei operated a social commerce network for its users. Ryan Wuerch founded the company in 2012. As of 2013, Solavei had 140 employees and was valued by investors at $120 million. The company has been described as a multi-level marketing (MLM) company, or of being very similar to a MLM company.

On June 18, 2014, the company filed Chapter 11 bankruptcy.

Solavei announced on November 19, 2015, that its carrier partner, T-Mobile USA, had terminated its agreement to provide service under the condition that Solavei did not meet expectations. Solavei customers were allowed to migrate to T-Mobile Prepaid for a $10 monthly credit for 6 months and a free month of service. Wireless service was discontinued on December 4, 2015.

== Background ==
Solavei was launched in September 2012 and operated as an MVNO through its partnership with T-Mobile US. The company's initial offering was a $49 per month, no-contract mobile phone plan for unlimited voice, text, and data. In September 2013, the company implemented the loyalty card program Solavei Marketplace. The program enabled users to receive discounts at participating retailers.

The company used a customer-to-customer marketing model, paying its customers on a recurring basis for referrals. As of August 2013, Solavei had paid out more than $14.4 million to its near 280,000 members.

== Leadership ==
Ryan Wuerch, former CEO and founder of Motricity, was the founder and CEO of Solavei. In February 2012, Wuerch and his team raised $5 million in initial seed funding.

Some of Solavei's financial backers included Jonathan Miller of News Corp and David Limp of Amazon.com.

== Marketing model ==
Solavei paid its customers for referrals. At its simplest, users earned $5 per month for every customer that they signed up for mobile service. The income generated was deposited on the Solavei Visa PayCard, which could be used wherever Visa is accepted. Solavei Visa PayCard also allowed members to gain access to Solavei Marketplace that was launched in October 2013, which featured cash-back discounts for a variety of retailers.

The company used its advertising and sponsorship funds to compensate its members to build distribution networks. Through sharing on social media outlets, grassroots campaigns on YouTube, and regional events, Solavei had developed a business model that relied on customer-to-customer interaction.
