= Lockerz =

Social commerce website

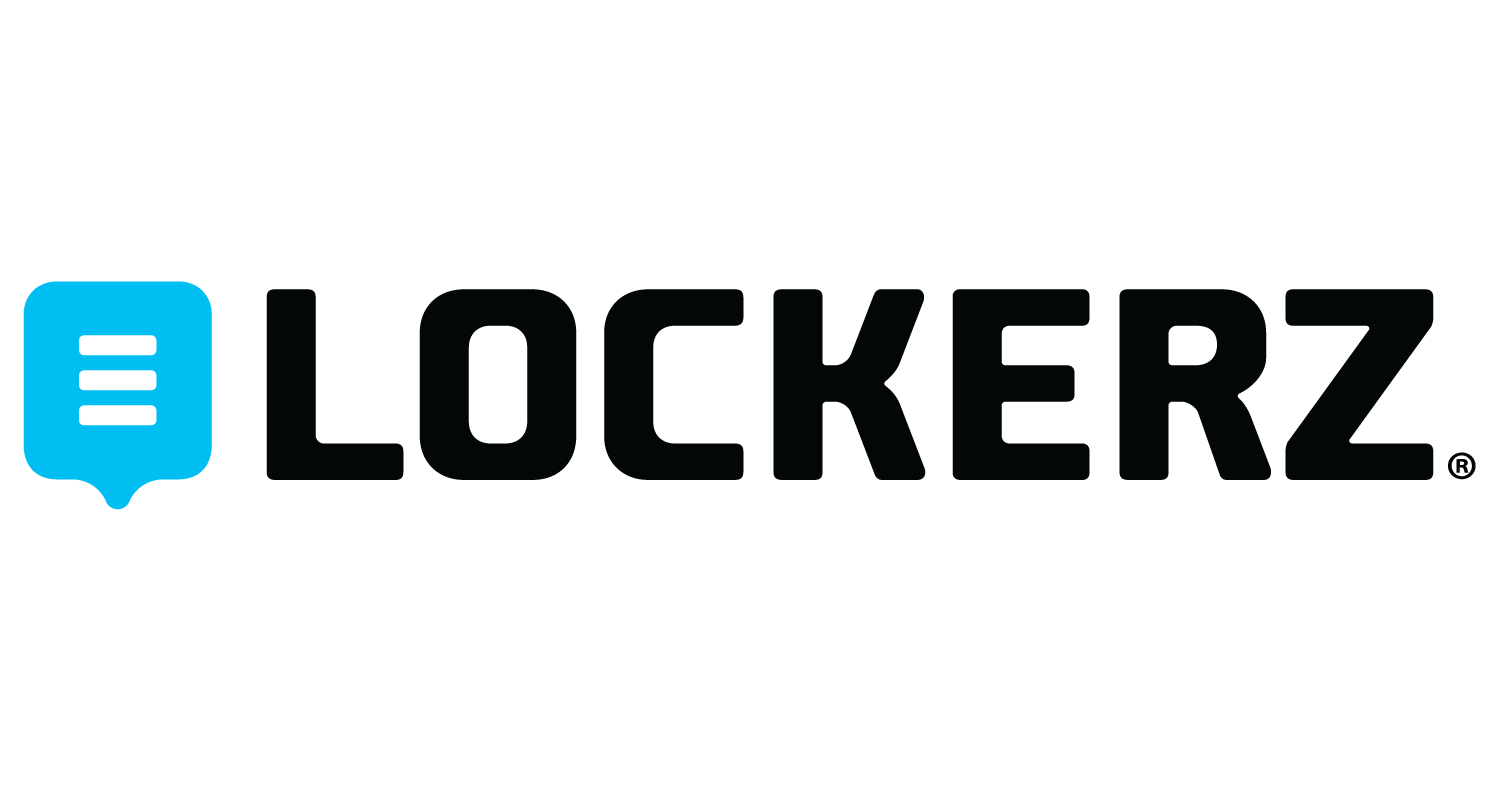
- Website type: Social commerce
- Available in: English
- Dissolved: 2014
- Headquarters: United States
- Area served: Worldwide
- Founder: Kathy Savitt
- Website: Lockerz.com
- Advertising: Viral Media
- Registration: Required
- Users: 19 million
- Launched: 2009
- Current status: Offline

Lockerz.com was an international social commerce website based in Seattle, Washington. It was founded in 2009; by July 2011, the site claimed to have 19 million members in 195 different countries.

Lockerz operated primarily on the basis of accumulating and spending Lockerz points, also called PTZ. Members acquired PTZ for logging into the site, watching short videos, referring friends, answering daily questions and polls, or purchasing items from Lockerz, among other activities. PTZ could be used for discounts on clothing, electronics, fashion accessories, and other products in the Lockerz SHOP. Lockerz was targeted at men and women ages 13–30, sometimes called Generation Y. The website also featured an original Web series called The Homes, starring Chelsea Kane.

The Lockerz website shut down during the summer of 2014 and redirected to Ador's website until 2016.

== History ==
Lockerz was founded in 2009 by Kathy Savitt, who was CEO until August 2012. Savitt was Chairman of the Board of Lockerz, a role she planned to retain while working full-time as the Chief Marketing Officer (CMO) of Yahoo!.

Membership of the site grew quickly because of the redeemable prizes, from an estimated 50 users shortly after startup to roughly 16 million less than twelve months later.

=== 2010 ===
- March 2010, Lockerz launched the beta version of Lockerz Play, the site's entertainment channel, where users were able to watch videos and collect PTZ for watching them in their entirety.
- July 2010, Lockerz announced the launch of Lockerz SHOP, the site's shopping platform, where members could redeem PTZ for discounts off products. There were typically about 200 brands available in the shop at any given time, and they would change every week, as quantities were limited. Brands at the time included Nintendo, Razer, and Sony, as well as Splendid, Rock and Republic, 7 for all Mankind, Ella Moss, and Dakine.
- October 2010, Lockerz launched CONNECT, or fwb (Friends With Benefits), the company's social networking platform. As part of this Lockerz introduced new site-member privacy controls regarding access to their information.
- November 2010, Lockerz launched "24/7", where users could bid on an item and the highest bidder received the prize.
- December 4, 2010; the second term of LAB began.

=== 2011 ===
- January 2011, Lockerz announced they acquired the Twitter photo-sharing application, Plixi
- July 2011, Lockerz announced they acquired the social sharing platform AddToAny.
- August 1, 2011: Lockerz announced that the "Redemption" system would be discontinued. A new pilot coupons program was launched at the same time which enabled members to use their points (PTZ) for discounts in restaurants, stores, and entertainment.
- August 4, 2011, Lockerz opened its site exploration to non-members. As part of this effort, the company redesigned its homepage and launched a new "Dealz" section which allowed members to purchase special offers on restaurants, sporting events, and fashion brands, among others. Redemptions were ended and Lockerz temporarily removed 24/7 auctions for upgrades to be relaunched at a later date.
- August 2011, Lockerz received funding from Live Nation.
- July 3, 2011, the third term of LAB began.
- December 2011, Lockerz acquired travel auction site Off & Away as part of a talent acquisition to build out their “platform for rewarded social expression.”

=== 2012 ===
- May 25, 2012, Lockerz acquired Chick Approved, an online fashion community, enabling users to share and receive instant feedback on personal style.

== Lockerz Advisory Board ==
The Lockerz Advisory Board, LAB for short, was created a few months after the launch of the test splash site for members to test features before they were released to the general public.

LAB were, "a select group of Lockerz members from around the world chosen for their creativity, smarts, and dedication to the Lockerz community. This in–the–know team provides support to our membership and tests new site features before they are officially released.". The LAB's first term consisted of about 20 members.

On December 4, 2010; the second term of LAB began. LAB 2.0 consisted of approximately 50 members which were broken up into 4 teams: Builders, Connectors, Influencers, and Curators.

The third term of LAB began on July 3, 2011, with a group of 20 members.

== Funding ==
Lockerz was funded by Kleiner Perkins Caufield & Byers (KPCB), the Silicon Valley venture capital firm, and online media conglomerate Liberty Media. In August 2011, Lockerz also received funding from Live Nation. In October 2012, Lockerz had raised a total of $80 million in venture funding.

== Controversy ==
It has been widely thought that Lockerz is an example of a Matrix scheme.

Complaints have been made regarding Lockerz' use of "waves", the way it decides who can claim the rewards for which they redeem their points. Many users alleged that all items on Lockerz could "sell out" within a matter of minutes, which implies that Lockerz only had a very limited supply of any redeemable items at the best of times, despite having "over 18+ million users in 195 different countries."

== See also ==
- Amazon.com
- Gilt Groupe
- Groupon
