= Slickdeals =

American website

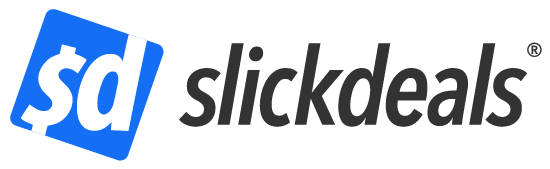
- Headquarters: Las Vegas, Nevada, {{{location_country}}}
- Country of origin: United States
- Founder: Van Trac
- Key people: Neville Crawley (CEO); Ken Leung (CTO); Vitaly Pecharsky (SVP Product)
- Website: slickdeals.net
- Launched: 1999; 27 years ago
- Current status: Active

Slickdeals is a mobile app and online platform where community members report and upvote the best deals on the internet each day. It is based in Las Vegas, Nevada.

== History ==
Slickdeals was founded in 1999.

In 2012, Warburg Pincus made an investment in Slickdeals.

In 2018, Hearst Corp and Goldman Sachs's private equity subsidiary, West Street Capital, acquired Slickdeals. At the time of the acquisition, Slickdeals had more than 10 million active users.

In June 2022, Statista named Slickdeals as the most visited coupon website in the United States.

In January 2024, Slickdeals named Neville Crawley as chief executive officer (CEO), succeeding Josh Meyers, who had been the CEO since 2013.

== Platform ==
Slickdeals' platform allows users to share, review, and give feedback on deals and coupons in the U.S. It also provides deal listings provided by the community and special saving coupons. USA Today called it one of the largest online deal-sharing communities.

It is also available as a browser extension.
