= Betabrand =

American clothing company

- Industry: Fashion
- Founded: 2010
- Founder: Chris Lindland
- Headquarters: San Francisco, United States
- Products: Dress Pant Yoga Pants, Yoga Denim, Work & Travel Apparel
- Website: www.betabrand.com

Betabrand is an online women's clothing company based in San Francisco's Mission district, known for Dress Pant Yoga Pants and other activewear for work and travel.

Betabrand customers participate in the design process by voting on new apparel concepts and providing feedback, helping the company rapidly bring new products to market. Products are launched in weekly live shows, where designers field questions from fans in an interactive, chat-based experience.

== History ==
The company began as Cordarounds in 2005, designing corduroy pants with wales aligned horizontally instead of vertically. After years of expanding its product offerings — these included Bike-To-Work Commuter Pants and Black Sheep Sweaters, made from the wool of actual black sheep — the company was renamed Betabrand in 2010.

The goal was to build a brand that behaves like a social network, where consumers interact with Betabrand designers as well as one another to inform and accelerate the design process. The company has since released more than 1,000 products, including collaborations with brands and celebrities like Timberland, The North Face, Vivo Barefoot, Margaret Cho, Bill Murray, and DJ Chris Holmes.

Betabrand officially launched its women's line in 2013 with a Dress Pant Yoga Pants campaign featuring only models with PhDs. Subsequent marketing efforts have aimed to reinforce the brand's digital identity. Notable examples include the Mark Zuckerberg-inspired Executive Hoodie, released ahead of Facebook's IPO, as well as Silicon Valley Fashion Week? and Podcast Theatre. In September 2013, the brand opened up a crowdsourced system, incorporating both in-house ideas and ideas sent by third-part designers.

In April 2020, during the COVID-19 lockdown, Betabrand hosted a "Work From Home Fashion Show" and social shopping event on its website.
