= Soldsie =

E-commerce website

- Type: Private
- Industry: Technology
- Founded: 2012
- Founder: Chris Bennett, Arrel Gray
- Headquarters: San Francisco, California, United States
- Key people: Chris Bennett (Co-Founder); Arrel Gray (Co-Founder)
- Website: http://www.soldsie.com

Soldsie is a social eCommerce platform founded in 2012 and based in San Francisco, California. The company developed tools that enabled businesses to sell products directly through social media platforms such as Facebook and Instagram by allowing customers to purchase items via comments.

== History ==
Soldsie is based in San Francisco, CA. Co-founders Chris Bennett (CEO) and Arrel Gray (CTO) met through the startup community of Silicon Valley in 2011. They launched Soldsie in May 2012 at a time when the viability of eCommerce was still being questioned by the industry. The company began as a tool for local businesses to create an online presence before pivoting to focus on enabling sales through Facebook. The founders of Soldsie were able to show that Facebook commerce is a viable form of social commerce when it wasn’t just another tab on a retailer's Facebook page for users to click onto. Soldsie raised $1 million for its full seed round. In addition to raising $425,000 from 72 investors through FundersClub, Soldsie also received funding from 500 Startups and e.ventures to close out its seed round.

By 2013, the platform had facilitated transactions for over 100,000 customers and more than 1,000 merchants, reflecting early adoption of comment-based purchasing.

In May 2014, Soldsie had processed over $25 million in transactions, and had raised $4 million for their Series A funding.

== Platform ==
Their social shopping platform allows businesses to monetize their social media pages through the use of comments, allowing brands to directly sell on Facebook and Instagram. Retailers looking at selling on Facebook or Instagram upload products according to a template that includes price and item description. They can then schedule campaigns, or sales of multiple items, that post at the designated time. Fans register through email and comment 'Sold' to trigger the purchasing process. The process is managed through a backend dashboard that compiles all the comments and then allows retailers to send invoices to buyers. Retailers can also turn on automatic invoices, track customers, and put buyers on a waitlist for out-of-stock items. This process allows businesses to turn their Facebook and Instagram pages into points of sale.
