= Audrey Gelman =

American political consultant

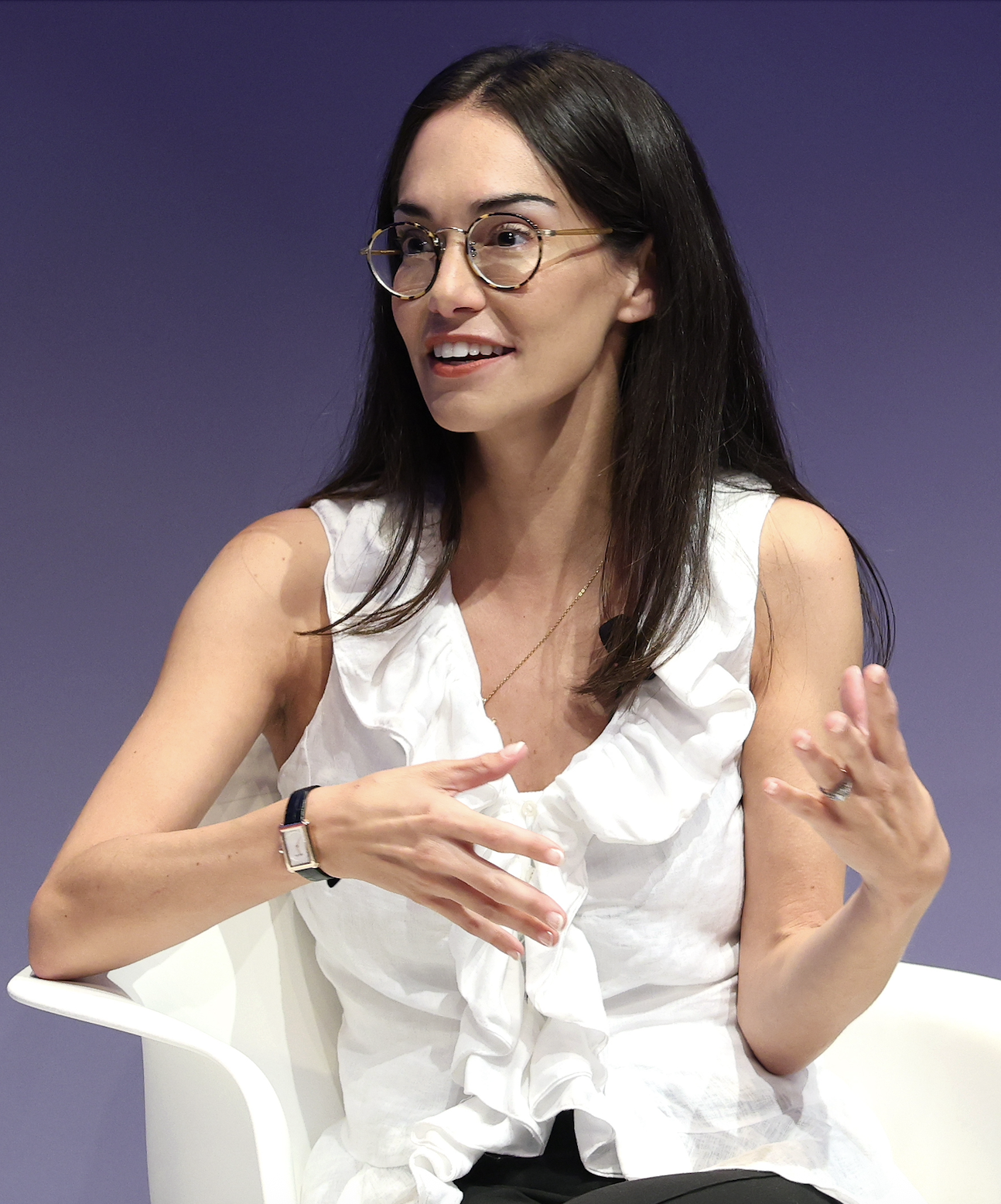
- Gelman at the 2026 Travel and Leisure Conference
- Born: June 2, 1987 (age 39)
- Education: Oberlin College; New York University
- Occupation: Entrepreneur
- Known for: The Wing
- Spouse: Ilan Zechory
- Children: 2

Audrey Gelman (born June 2, 1987) is an American businessperson and political staffer. She is the founder of The Wing, a women's co-working space and social club founded in New York City in 2016. She founded The Six Bells Inn in 2025. She was the inspiration for Allison Williams's character Marnie on Girls.

== Early life and education ==
Gelman is the daughter of microbiologist Irwin Gelman and psychologist Lisa Speigel. She was raised on the Upper West Side. Gelman attended the Lab School and Bard High School in New York City. She began studies at Oberlin College in 2005 and attended for two years before leaving to work for Hillary Clinton's 2008 campaign for U.S. President. She returned to New York after Clinton's primary defeat. She finished her bachelor's degree in political science at New York University. During this time, she also appeared in the satirical web series Delusional Downtown Divas by Lena Dunham.

== Career ==
In 2008, Gelman worked as a press aide for Hillary Clinton's campaign for president. She served as deputy communications director in Scott Stringer's successful campaign to win the position of New York City Comptroller in 2013. During the 2012 presidential election, Gelman was involved with the revival of the political action committee Downtown for Democracy. In 2013, Gelman joined the New York office of strategic consulting firm SKDKnickerbocker.

In October 2016, Gelman launched The Wing, a women's co-working space with her co-founder Lauren Kassan. Initially, she and Kassan raised $2.4 million to create the club, with "aspirations to resurrect the atmosphere of the women’s clubs of the late 19th and early 20th century suffrage movement." The first location was in the Flatiron District. The club had a founding membership of 200 women.

In its first two years operations, the Wing did not have a formal membership policy and its practice was to only admit women and non-binary individuals. On March 1, 2018, the New York City Commission on Human Rights started a "commission-initiated" investigation into how The Wing membership system operates. In August 2018, a male applicant who was denied admission filed a lawsuit against The Wing for gender discrimination. Shortly afterwards, the company instituted its first formal membership policy which went into effect on September 24, 2018. In June 2019, the Wing's motion to dismiss the lawsuit was denied and as of September 2019, the lawsuit was pending.

In April 2017, The Wing announced it had raised a Series A led by venture capital fund New Enterprise Associates with support from Kleiner Perkins Caufield & Byers and an expansion to three new locations. The Series A funding came to $8 million. By November 2017, the club had around 1,500 members. That month, The Wing launched the magazine No Man's Land and also raised $32 million in a series B funding round, led by WeWork. By December 2017, The Wing had a second location in New York's Soho.

In 2013, Politico listed Gelman as one of its 50 Politicos to Watch. In the December 2014 issue of Forbes, Gelman was named one of its 30 Under 30: Corporate Climbers, and was previously named in the magazine's 30 Under 30: Law and Policy list. In 2017, Fast Company named Gelman to their Most Creative People in Business list. In December 2017, she was listed in a TechCrunch feature on 42 women succeeding in tech.

Gelman endorsed Democratic candidate Hillary Clinton in the run-up for the 2016 U.S. presidential election.

In 2019, Gelman was featured on the cover of Inc. magazine, marking the first time a visibly pregnant woman appeared on the cover of a business magazine.

In June 2020, after complaints about how The Wing failed to address racist behavior of its members and an employee walkout, Gelman resigned from her position as CEO.

In April 2022, Gelman opened The Six Bells ("a new old country store") in Brooklyn.

On August 31, 2022, the Wing shut down permanently.

In 2025, Gelman founded The Six Bells, a "countryside inn" in the Hudson Valley.

== Personal life ==
Gelman dated controversial photographer Terry Richardson from 2011 until 2013. In April 2016, she married Genius co-founder Ilan Zechory in Detroit. Their first child was born in 2019.

She is a childhood friend of Lena Dunham; they both went on to attend Oberlin College. Dunham has stated that Gelman is the inspiration for the Girls character Marnie. Gelman portrayed the character of Audrey, a free-spirited new girlfriend of Marnie's on-and-off boyfriend, in the early seasons of the show.

== See also ==
- List of New York University alumni
