= Robin Melanie Leacock =

American film director

Robin Melanie Leacock (Robin Baker Leacock) is a documentary filmmaker who directed It Girls, "A Passion For Giving", "I'll Take Manhattan", "Stella is 95" & "Stella & Co: A Romantic Musical Comedy About Aging".

"It Girls" is a documentary film about fashion that aired nationally in the U.S. on April 2 and 7, 2002. "A Passion For Giving" is a documentary film about philanthropy, focusing on various charities and the simple gesture of helping others. It aired in the fall of 2009 on PBS. I'll Take Manhattan is a comedy about Native Americans and Wall Street. "Stella is 95" is a charming documentary about Robin's Mother, the extremely charismatic and brilliant 95 year old Estelle Craig. "Stella is 95" aired nationally on PBS in 2011. "Stella & Co: A Romantic Musical Comedy About Aging" is a documentary about the wonders of aging featuring then 103 year old Estelle Craig and other special guests all above the age of 80, airing nationally on PBS in 2020.

Robin Baker Leacock is currently publishing two books, "This Mysterious Place Known As MORTIMERS" & "RADIANCE: WORTH RE-IMAGINED".

== Family ==
Robin Melanie Leacock, the daughter-in-law of cinema verite pioneer Richard Leacock, is married to the director and cinematographer Robert Leacock.
