= LivingSocial =

Company purchased by Groupon

- Website type: Electronic commerce
- Available in: English and others (for 27 countries)
- Headquarters: Chicago, Illinois, U.S.
- Owner: Groupon
- Creators: Tim O'Shaughnessy; Aaron Batalion; Eddie Frederick; Val Aleksenko
- Key people: Gautam Thakar; (CEO & president before company was acquired by Groupon)
- Revenue: $536,000,000 (2012) $57,000,000 (2015)
- Website: LivingSocial.com
- Commercial: Yes
- Launched: June 29, 2007; 19 years ago (as Hungry Machine)
- Current status: Active

LivingSocial was an American online marketplace that offered daily deals and experiences to consumers. Founded in 2007 in Washington, D.C., the company grew to nearly 70 million members around the world by 2013. In 2016, Groupon acquired LivingSocial.

== History ==
LivingSocial was founded as Hungry Machine in 2007 by four employees from Revolution Health Group. After acquiring BuyYourFriendADrink.com in 2009, LivingSocial launched a daily deals website. The company offered its first deal in July 2009. By July 2010, the company had launched deals in 25 cities.

By 2011, LivingSocial had raised over $800 million in venture capital funds. That same year, the company generated $238 million in revenue but lost $499 million. In 2012, a class action lawsuit was filed against LivingSocial with respect to the expiration of deals, following a similar action against Groupon. A provisional settlement was reached in November 2012.

In 2012, the Government of the District of Columbia offered the company a number of tax breaks and incentives to open offices and hire workers in Washington, DC. However, a year later the company did not reach the size it needed to be for the tax breaks to kick in, as it had begun laying off workers and subleased offices it purchased earlier. The company also announced it was changing its focus from daily deals to a website and mobile app.

On April 26, 2013, it was announced that LivingSocial's database had been hacked, affecting 50 million registered users. While the announcement stated that credit card information not compromised, other user information including passwords was exposed. On May 1, 2013, the Attorneys General of Connecticut and Maryland sent a joint letter to LivingSocial requesting additional information about the incident, as well as more details about the company's data management policies and procedures.

By 2015, LivingSocial had 800 employees, down from a peak of 4,500 in 2011. In 2016, it laid off half of its remaining workforce. That year, The Washington Post reported that many laid off or departed workers formed new tech companies in LivingSocial's home city of Washington, DC.

In October 2016, Groupon Inc. purchased LivingSocial for an undisclosed amount. The Washington Post later reported this amount was $0. Groupon began laying off all remaining employees and closed the LivingSocial D.C. office.

=== Leadership changes ===
In March 2012, co-founder Eddie Frederick stepped down as president and from the board of directors. A year later in March 2013, co-founder and CTO Aaron Battalion stepped down from his post. In January 2014, LivingSocial's CEO Tim O'Shaughnessy announced his resignation, remaining CEO until a replacement was named. In July 2014, it was announced that Gautam Thakar, then-CEO of Shopping.com at eBay, would succeed the position of CEO at LivingSocial.

=== Acquisitions ===
- In October 2010, LivingSocial announced acquisition of social adventure company Urban Escapes.
- In November 2010, LivingSocial bought $5 million controlling stake in Australian social shopping site Jump On It. In March 2012, LivingSocial purchased Jump On it for $40 million.
- In January 2011, LivingSocial acquired a majority stake in LetsBonus. It sold LetsBonus in 2015.
- In March 2011, LivingSocial acquired InfoEther, a Ruby/Rails consultancy.
- In June 2011, Dubai Based GoNabit, an Arabic website for daily deals, was acquired by LivingSocial.
- In June 2011, LivingSocial acquired DealKeren, which offers daily deals in Indonesia, and its parent company Ensogo, which offer daily deals in Thailand and the Philippines.
- In August 2011, LivingSocial acquired TicketMonster for $350 million. In November 2013, LivingSocial sold TicketMonster to Groupon for $260 million. TicketMonster was later bought back by a consortium of investors led by KKR in 2015, for $782 million.
- In April 2012, ONOSYS, a mobile and online ordering provider, was acquired by LivingSocial.
