= Traffics and Discoveries =

1904 collection of poems and short stories by Rudyard Kipling

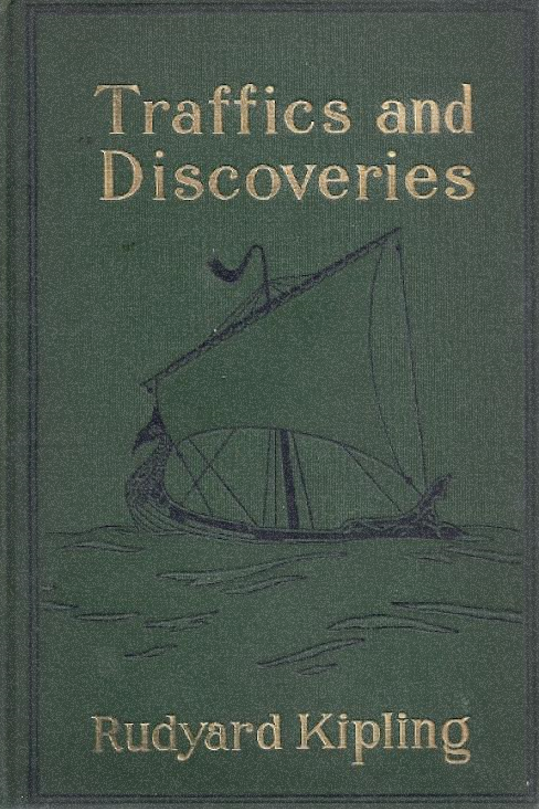
Front cover of the US first edition (Doubleday, Page & Co., October 1904)

Traffics and Discoveries is a collection of poems and short stories by Rudyard Kipling, published by Macmillan and Co. of London and Doubleday, Page of New York in 1904.

Among the books in Kipling's study was a set of the reissued Principall Navigations, Voiages, Traffiques and Discoveries of the English Nation (1598–1600) by Richard Hakluyt, from which Kipling took the title of this collection.

Stories (11):

- The Captive
- The Bonds of Discipline
- A Sahibs' War
- "Their Lawful Occasions" (as Part I and Part II)
- The Comprehension of Private Copper
- Steam Tactics
- "Wireless"
- The Army of a Dream (as Part I and Part II)
- "They"
- Mrs. Bathurst
- Below the Mill Dam

One poem precedes each story, as in many Kipling collections:

- From the Masjid-Al-Aqsa of Sayyid Ahmed (Wahabi)
- Poseidon's Law
- The Runners
- The Wet Litany
- The King's Task
- The Necessitarian
- Kaspar's Song in "Varda"
- Song of the Old Guard
- The Return of the Children
- From Lyden's "Irenius"
- "Our Fathers Also"

The use of italic font for all poem titles only follows the Contents list in the first edition (London: Macmillan and Co., 1904). The use of quotation marks follows that list, and also the story headings and running heads, except that the first edition uses single quotation marks throughout.

== See also ==
- List of the works of Rudyard Kipling
- 1904 in literature
