= Hayley Barna =

American businesswoman

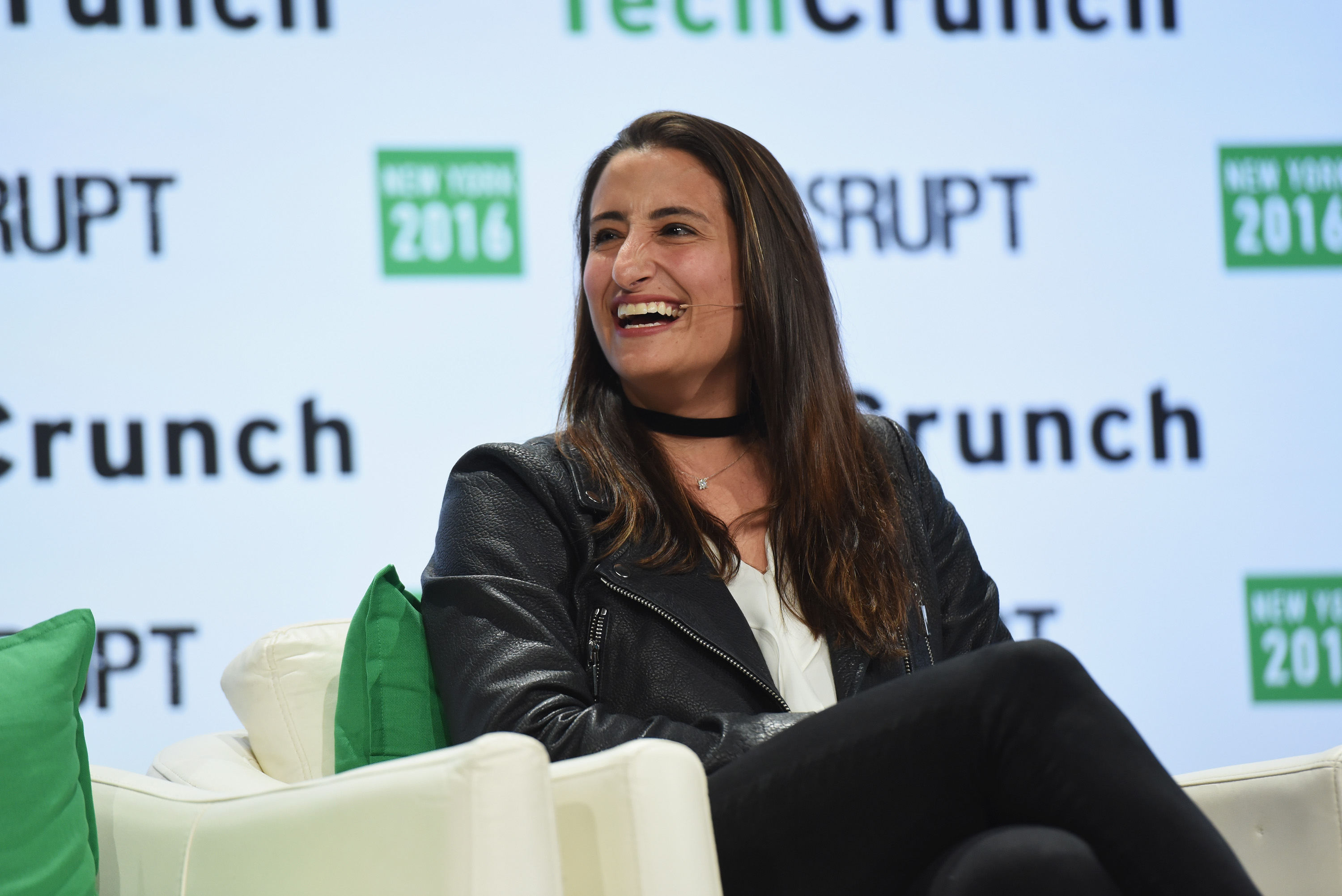
- Born: 1983 (age 42–43); New York
- Education: Harvard University and Harvard Business School
- Occupations: Entrepreneur, investor
- Website: First Round

Hayley Barna is an American entrepreneur and venture capitalist who co-founded Birchbox in 2009, while at Harvard Business School. In 2015, Barna "stepped away from her day-to-day role" at Birchbox, remaining a board member. In 2016, she became a partner of First Round Capital.

== Early life and education ==
Hayley Bay Barna was born in 1983. Her parents, Eileen B. Maisel and Richard A. Barna of New York, both worked at RAB Lighting in New Jersey. In high school, she was published in an international science research journal. She graduated magna cum laude from Harvard and has an MBA from Harvard Business School.

== Career ==
Barna began her career shortly after she graduated from Harvard University joining Bain & Company in New York. She moved to Christie's Hong Kong location where she worked in strategy and then in product management for Amazon.com.

=== Birchbox ===
While working towards her MBA at Harvard Business School, Barna became friends with Katia Beauchamp. Together, they founded the company Birchbox in 2010. What began as a business plan during B-School, turned into a website where they began to acquire customers interested in "an ecommerce experience focused on new product discovery." In 2013, Barna and Beauchamp won the Leadership Award At Forbes Women's Summit. Barna and Beauchamp opened the first Birchbox store in 2014.

As of 2015, Birchbox had received over $70 million in venture funding and had one million subscribers. In August 2015, Barna stepped down from her role as co-CEO of the company. She remained a member of the board, and she spent the subsequent six months as an angel investor.

=== First round ===
In 2016, after announcing it in February, Barna joined First Round Capital as a venture partner. On February 16, 2016, Barna shared a post on publishing platform medium.com about her first day at First Round stating, "I can’t think of a better place to do this than First Round, which led the seed round in my company Birchbox, and has always put founders first through good times and bad." She was their first female partner. One of her first initial First Round investments was the travel startup Collective Hotels & Retreats, with her also joining the board.

By late 2017, she largely focused on e-commerce startups. She was on the boards of Madison Reed and RAB Lighting. She was also organizing a working group of women in technology in New York with monthly meetings. Also in late 2017, she was promoted to general partner. At that point, she had invested in companies such as Collective Retreats, Keeps, CrowdJustice, and Mirror.

== Personal life ==
Barna is based in Manhattan, New York. While at Harvard Business School, she met her husband, Fredrik Vik Maroe. They wed in 2014, at a private estate located in Staatsburg, New York.
