= Social shopping =

Social shopping is a method of e-commerce where shoppers' friends become involved in the shopping experience. Social shopping attempts to use technology to mimic the social interactions found in physical malls and stores. With the rise of mobile devices, social shopping is now extending beyond the online world and into the offline world of shopping.

== Five categories ==
Social shopping spans a wide range of definitions but can largely be divided into five categories: Group shopping sites, Shopping communities, Recommendation engines, Shopping Marketplaces, and Shared Shopping.

1. Group shopping sites include companies like Groupon and LivingSocial. These sites encourage groups of people to buy together at wholesale prices, essentially a Costco-like model for the online world.
2. Shopping communities bring like-minded people together to discuss, share, and shop. Using the wisdom of crowds, users communicate and aggregate information about products, prices, and deals. Many sites allow users to create custom shopping lists and share them with friends. To date, fashion communities have largely dominated this space. Yet, shopping communities are not limited exclusively to fashion. Some platforms like Zwibe are across all categories and actually pay the influencer if they make a sale in their group. Other shopping communities include Listia, an online community for free stuff. Activity-based clubs (such as travel or adventure-sports clubs) are the in-person analogy for this category of social shopping.
3. Recommendation engines allow shoppers to provide advice to fellow shoppers. The in-store analogy for this category of social shopping is asking a fellow shopper for advice. Traditional online product review companies such as Amazon have helped many consumers to date but currently emphasize obtaining and giving advice to strangers. Up and coming social shopping startups encourage conversations about purchases with a user's friends or acquaintance.
4. Social Shopping Marketplaces which bring sellers and buyers together to connect and transact like Shopcade, Polyvore, Storenvy, Etsy, SavelGo, and Impulse. The offline analogy for this category is a farmers market or bazaar. The marketplace brings together independent sellers and creates a forum for them to display and sell their wares to buyers. The marketplace affords buyers and sellers methods to connect and communicate whilst also performing the role of e-commerce facilitator for sellers and discovery engine for buyers.
5. Shared Shopping mechanisms for catalog-based e-commerce sites. These allow shoppers to form ad hoc collaborative shopping groups in which one person can drive an online shopping experience for one or more other people, using real-time communication among themselves and with the retailer.

== Benefits for retailers ==
Social shopping sites may generate revenue not only from affiliate marketing, advertising and click throughs, but also by sharing information about their users with retailers. Some sites concentrate on the user interactions that pass on information and recommendations that are hard to acquire from sales personnel.

== Benefits for customers ==
Social shopping sites motivate their users to participate in ways. Many sites offer nothing of specific value in return, relying on the user's intrinsic sense of social reward to share information with the community. Other sites offer tangible rewards for sharing information. Other sites offer incentives in the form of reputations points that can be redeemed for gifts.

== Extensions ==
Social shopping can also exist in the real-world beyond the obvious swapping of consumer stories with people one knows. For example, when you walk into a dressing room, the mirror reflects your image, but you also see images of the apparel item and celebrities wearing it on an interactive display. A webcam also projects an image of the consumer wearing the item on the website for everyone to see. This creates an interaction between the consumers inside the store and their social network outside the store. The technology behind this system uses RFID.

There are various ways for stores to use social shopping features. Some websites offer a combination of comparison shopping with social features. Others combine physical stores and social features, for example, allowing customers to share finds and deals from physical retailers through the phone and website and interact with users that have similar shopping interests.

Some websites use established online social networks and tools rather than trying to build their own. By implementing applications like Facebook Connect which allow users to ask their Facebook friends' opinions on purchases directly on the social shopping site. Others implement the Twitter API, allowing their users to share content through tweets. Similarly, there are also social shopping applications that utilize existing networks to integrate users' social networks with shopping that aggregates sales offers from Instagram using the API.

== See also ==
- Communal shopping
- Shopow, online social shopping website
- Social commerce
- Web 2.0
