= Anita Borg Institute Women of Vision Awards =

Award for women in technology

- Awarded for: Exceptional achievement by women in technology
- Country: United States
- Presented by: Anita Borg Institute for Women and Technology
- First award: 2005
- Website: Past Anita Borg Institute Women of Vision Winners

The Anita Borg Institute Women of Vision Awards honor exceptional technical women. Three awards are presented by the Anita Borg Institute for Women and Technology (renamed AnitaB.org in 2017) each year, recognizing women in the categories of Innovation, Leadership, and Social Impact.

== Awards ==
The Anita Borg Institute Women of Vision Award for Innovation recognizes a woman for her contributions to technology innovation and progress.

The Anita Borg Institute Women of Vision Award for Social Impact recognizes a woman has changed the way technology effects society.

The Anita Borg Institute Women of Vision Award for Leadership recognizes a woman for her demonstrated leadership.

== Anita Borg Institute Women of Vision Awards Banquet ==
The awards were at first presented annually at a banquet in Silicon Valley. The awards banquet has featured notable keynote speakers, including Anousheh Ansari (2011), Arianna Huffington (2010), Padmasree Warrior (2009), Diane Greene (2008), Esther Dyson (2007), and John L. Hennessy (2005).

=== Anita Borg Top Company for Technical Woman Award ===
Beginning in 2011, the winner of the Anita Borg Top Company for Technical Women Award is honored at the awards banquet. A representative from the winning company receives the award and gives an acceptance speech.

== Changes after 2016 ==
The Anita Borg Institute moved the awards ceremony to the Anita Borg Grace Hopper Celebration of Women in Computing. They have also slightly altered some of the award names from "Abi" awards to "Abie Awards".

== List of Anita Borg Institute Women of Vision Award winners ==
Year	Innovation	Leadership	Social Impact
2005	Radia Perlman	Janie Tsao	Pamela Samuelson
2007	Deborah Estrin	Duy-Loan Le	Leah Jamieson
2008	Helen Greiner	Susan Landau	Justine Cassell
2009	Yuqing Gao	Jan Cuny	Mitchell Baker
2010	Kathleen McKeown	Kristina Johnson	Lila Ibrahim
2011	Mary Lou Jepsen	Chieko Asakawa	Karen Panetta
2012	Sarita Adve	Jennifer Chayes	Sarah Revi Sterling
2013	Maja Matarić	Genevieve Bell	Vicki Hanson
2014	Tal Rabin	Maria Klawe	Kathrin Winkler
2023			

In 2015, the awards were updated to include the Student of Vision Award. "This award honors young women dedicated to creating a future where the people who imagine and build technology mirror the people and societies for which they build it." The award for technology entrepreneurship was also added. Each year, the types of awards change.

Year	Technical Leadership	Government	Student of Vision	Technology Entrepreneurship	Social Impact	Educational Innovation	Emerging Tech / Leader
2015	Julie Larson-Green		Camila Fernandez Achutti	Kamakshi Sivaramakrishnan			
2016	Michele Guel		Alyssia Jovellanos	Pooja Sankar			
2017	Mercedes Soria and Diane Greene		Mehul Raje	Laura Mather			
2018	Rebecca Parsons		Chia Amisola	Holly Liu			
2019	Fei-Fei Li		Jhillika Kumar	Natalya Bailey			
2020	Lisa Su		Pelagia Majoni	Tracy Young			
2021	Nuria Oliver		Ainura Sagyn	Eden Canlilar	Eden Canlilar	Lisa Hauser	Eden Canlilar
2022	Daphne Koller		Katherine Vergara	Neha Narkhede			Kris Dorsey Paula Coto, Change Agent
2023	Margaret Burnett	Renata Sparks	Ange Cynthia Umuhire	Eva Esteban Velasco	Esther Kumali	Carlotta Berry	Eva Esteban Velasco, Emerging Tech
2024	Kathy Pham	Noreen Hecmanczuk					

== See also ==
- List of awards honoring women
- List of computer-related awards
- Anita Borg Institute for Women and Technology
- Anita Borg
- Telle Whitney
