= Adam Lilling =

American entrepreneur and venture capitalist

- Born: 1970 (age 55–56); Brooklyn, New York, US
- Education: University of Michigan; University of Southern California
- Occupations: Internet entrepreneur; Venture Capitalist
- Board member of: Board of directors Movieclips, HelloMusic; board adviser ShareThis, MoviePass, BigFrame, MediaNet
- Website: Official website

Adam Lilling (born 1970) is an entrepreneur and venture capitalist. The founder of Pentagon CDs and Tapes, an internet music retailer which launched in 1995, Lilling is recognized for his early role in the development of the online music business and e-commerce practices. He is the co-founder of Launchpad LA, a mentorship program which later became a startup accelerator, and the founder and managing partner of Plus Capital, a venture capital firm.

== Early life and education ==
Lilling was born in Brooklyn and raised in Muttontown, New York. He attended the University of Michigan, where he earned a bachelor's degree from the School of Business Administration. A lifelong musician, Lilling planned to pursue a career in music composition for film and television; after moving to Los Angeles in 1992, he enrolled in a graduate school program at the Thornton School of Music at the University of Southern California. The one-year program, run by Buddy Baker, was taught by prominent composers such as Jerry Goldsmith; Lilling's class of 19 students included Marco Beltrami and Christophe Beck. At the conclusion of the program, rather than work as a composer, Lilling opted to work in the music business.

== Career ==
In college, Lilling founded Soundtrax, a short-lived company which focused on selling film soundtracks at theaters. Soundtrax was dissolved when Lilling, then 23, was hired by Miles Copeland as the director of marketing for Vending Intelligence, one of Copeland's many companies. Regarded as groundbreaking, Vending Intelligence developed and sold CD vending machines which allowed customers to select and hear a 30-second sample of every CD included in the machine's inventory. Vending Intelligence was not successful, and in 1994, Lilling was reassigned to Copeland's label, I.R.S. Records, as the West Coast head of regional marketing and sales. In 1995, while still at I.R.S., Lilling started Pentagon, an online cassette and CD retailer, who, among other innovations, distributed the first album offered online prior to its brick-and-mortar release. Pentagon was among the earliest internet retailers to offer personalized recommendations, gift packaging, and the ability to pre-order albums for day-of-release shipment; Pentagon also initiated the now-standard practices involving inventory, content, and advertising. Major labels paid for "Featured Artist" placement; chat boards and community areas encouraged dialogue among consumers, and Pentagon's inventory of 150,000 CDs and tapes included independent artists. "Here were bands who were selling tapes out of their trunks after shows, and now they've got international distribution," Lilling said in a 1995 interview with Billboard. "And people who love music can sample and buy music from bands that haven't been signed yet." Perceived at the time as a competitor to CD Now and Amazon, Pentagon adhered to a strategy of limited expenses and sustainable growth, and became profitable early in the company's evolution. In 1999, Lilling sold the company to the Virgin Entertainment Group, who adopted Pentagon's proprietary e-commerce technology and, in 2000, formed a new venture, Pazanga, which became a premiere worldwide entertainment e-commerce services provider. Still, following the dot-com crash, Pazanga's value dropped dramatically.

In 2004, Lilling co-founded BiggerBoat with Barbara DeLury, who had been Pazanga's CTO. The first entertainment-specific search engine, BiggerBoat built an advertising platform based on monitoring the media consumption of over 27 million consumers. In 2005 BiggerBoat received investment funding; in 2009, Lilling and De Lury bought the company back in order to reestablish ownership of the intellectual property. Edified by the experience, Lilling shifted his focus to venture capital. In 2010, at the invitation of Mark Suster of Upfront Ventures, Lilling co-founded Launchpad LA, an organization designed to guide young Los Angeles-based entrepreneurs through mentorship. By 2011, 19 of the 23 companies incubated via Launchpad LA had received funding and/or been acquired, and in 2012, Lilling was included on the Forbes list of the "12 entrepreneurs who are changing LA forever." Additionally, Lilling invested in BigFrame, MoviePass, advised the boards of AgentAce, The Cradle, MediaNet, Triptrotting, ShareThis, and MediaNet, and was appointed to the board of directors for Chromatik, HelloMusic, and MovieClips (now ZEFR). Featured in Variety's 2013 list of Venture Capitol Kingmakers and described as a "serial entrepreneur," Lilling launched Plus Capital, a venture capital fund designed to connect early stage companies with influencers and investors, in March 2013.
