= WIST =

WIST may refer to:

- WIST-FM, a radio station (98.3 FM) licensed to Thomasville, North Carolina, United States
- WQNO, a radio station (690 AM) licensed to New Orleans, Louisiana, United States, which held the call sign WIST from 2005 to 2012
- WIST-94, a Polish pistol
- Whist, a classic card game
- WYFQ, a radio station (930 AM) licensed to Charlotte, North Carolina, United States, which held the call sign WIST from 1947 to the 1960s
- WHVN, a radio station (1240 AM) licensed to Charlotte, North Carolina, United States, which held the call sign WIST from the 1960s to 1983
- WNLV, a radio station (95.1 FM) licensed to Charlotte, North Carolina, United States, which held the call sign WIST-FM prior to 1972
- WGFY, a radio station (1480 AM) licensed to Charlotte, North Carolina, United States, which held the call sign WIST from 1994 to 1996
- WOLS, a radio station (106.1 FM) licensed to Waxhaw, North Carolina, United States, which held the call sign WIST-FM from 1995 to 1996
- WAME, a radio station (550 AM) licensed to Statesville, North Carolina, United States, which held the call sign WIST from 1996 to 1997 and from 1998 to 2000
- WBLO, a radio station (790 AM) licensed to Thomasville, North Carolina, United States, which held the call sign WIST during 2004

== See also ==
- Wist, an application for smartphones that helped users find top five restaurants, bars and coffee shops nearby
- Cole Wist, American attorney and politician
- Johannes B. Wist, Norwegian American newspaper editor, journalist and author
