= Whrrl =

Social location-based service

- Website type: Social networking
- Available in: English
- Owner: Pelago, Inc.
- Website: whrrl.com
- Launched: October 2007
- Current status: Shutdown

Whrrl was a social location-based service developed by the Seattle-based company Pelago, Inc. Whrrl had a recommendation engine that uses algorithms and users' votes to surface relevant recommendations.

On June 30, 2010, Whrrl launched its Society Rewards Program, designed to close the gap between a brand's online social media and real-world presence with its first partner, Murphy USA Oil.

Groupon announced that it had purchased Whrrl on April 18, 2011. As Whrrl dissipates, it is being speculated that Groupon will leverage location based social networking or "check-ins" on their popular group coupon site.

== Site overview ==
The service was launched in October 2007 as a geosocial networking and discovery site that allows both web and mobile users to find, explore, share, meet up at, and rate points-of-interest in their cities.

Pelago's first product, Whrrl, was launched on July 10, 2008. Whrrl v1.0 was a location-based social networking and discovery application for the iPhone, Blackberry and numerous other mobile phones.

Pelago launched Whrrl 2.0, an 'on-the-go' storytelling application for the iPhone and web on March 16 at South by Southwest. Whrrl 3.0 was launched at SXSW on March 11, 2010 with a promise: "We'll save you from Farmville." Press release here.

== Pelago, Inc. ==
The company was founded by Amazon.com veterans Jeff Holden and Darren Vengroff.

In November 2006, Pelago, Inc completed Series A financing backed by Kleiner, Perkins, Caufield & Byers; Trilogy Equity Partners; and Bezos Expeditions. It is also the first product to be financially backed by the iFund.

In May 2008, Pelago announced a second round of funding totaling US$15 million led by Deutsche Telekom, followed by India-based Reliance Technology Ventures and DAG Ventures.

In April 2011, Pelago was acquired by Groupon and the Whrrl service was discontinued.
