= Apperian =

Defunct software company in Boston, USA

Apperian, Inc.
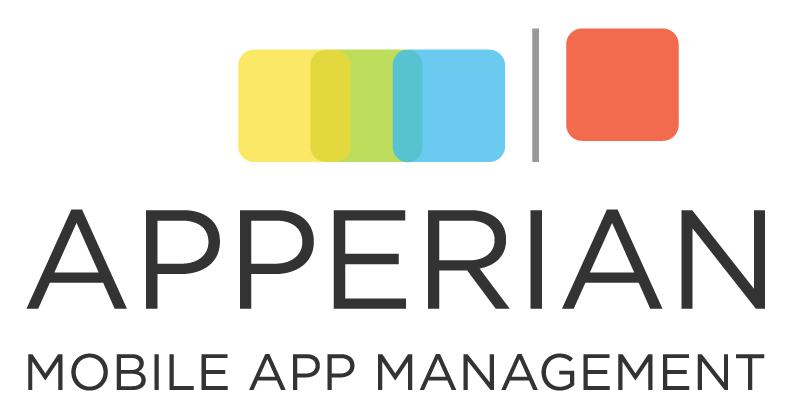
- Type: Private
- Industry: Mobile application management
- Founded: 2009; 17 years ago
- Defunct: 2017
- Headquarters: Boston, Massachusetts, U.S.A.
- Products: Apperian EASE®
- Number of employees: 50 - 100
- Website: www.apperian.com

Apperian, Inc. was a Boston-based software company. The organization provided a mobile application management platform that did not require app code modifications or software development kits (SDKs).

Apperian sold cloud-based and on-premises software through a privately branded enterprise app store to employees and contracted workers without requiring the device to be managed.

== Mobile application management ==
Apperian technology was intended to address problems with devices such as iPads used in businesses. Apperian's mobile application management (MAM) platform was designed for business administrators to secure, manage, distribute, and monitor enterprise mobile apps for the iOS operating system on Apple iPhone and iPad devices, Android OS devices, and Windows Phone devices. The platform could also be used for user acceptance testing of consumer and business mobile apps.

Apperian's customers included NVIDIA, New Balance, Nationwide Mutual Insurance, and the U.S. Department of Homeland Security.

== Company ==
Privately held and based in Boston, Apperian was founded in January 2009 as a third-party developer of enterprise iPhone apps before announcing EASE in 2010. One of its founders, Chuck Goldman, was the head of Apple's professional services division and its iPhone Enterprise Beta Program. Apperian raised $1.9 million from angel investors in July 2009. The company closed a $9.5 million venture capital round of financing in early 2011 from North Bridge Venture Partners, Bessemer Venture Partners, Kleiner Perkins Caufield & Byers’ iFund, CommonAngels, and LaunchCapital. Apperian closed a $12.4 million round in March 2012 from original investors and added another strategic investment from Intel Capital, bringing the company's total financing to $28 million. In 2015, the company reported that it doubled new bookings year-over-year, increased new business pipeline by over 300 percent, and had over 1.5 million enterprise app downloads.

In January 2017, Apperian was acquired by Arxan Technologies for an undisclosed amount. It now operates as Digital.ai App Management.
