= WTNC =

WTNC may refer to:

- WTNC-LD, a low-powered television station (channel 11, virtual 26) in the Raleigh/Durham, North Carolina television market
- WBLO, a radio station (790 AM) licensed to Thomasville, North Carolina, United States and once called WTNC
- WIST-FM, a radio station (98.3 FM) licensed to Thomasville, North Carolina, United States and once called WTNC-FM
- WBRL-CD, a low-powered television station (channel 21) in Baton Rouge, Louisiana once called WTNC
