= John Doerr =

American businessman (born 1951)

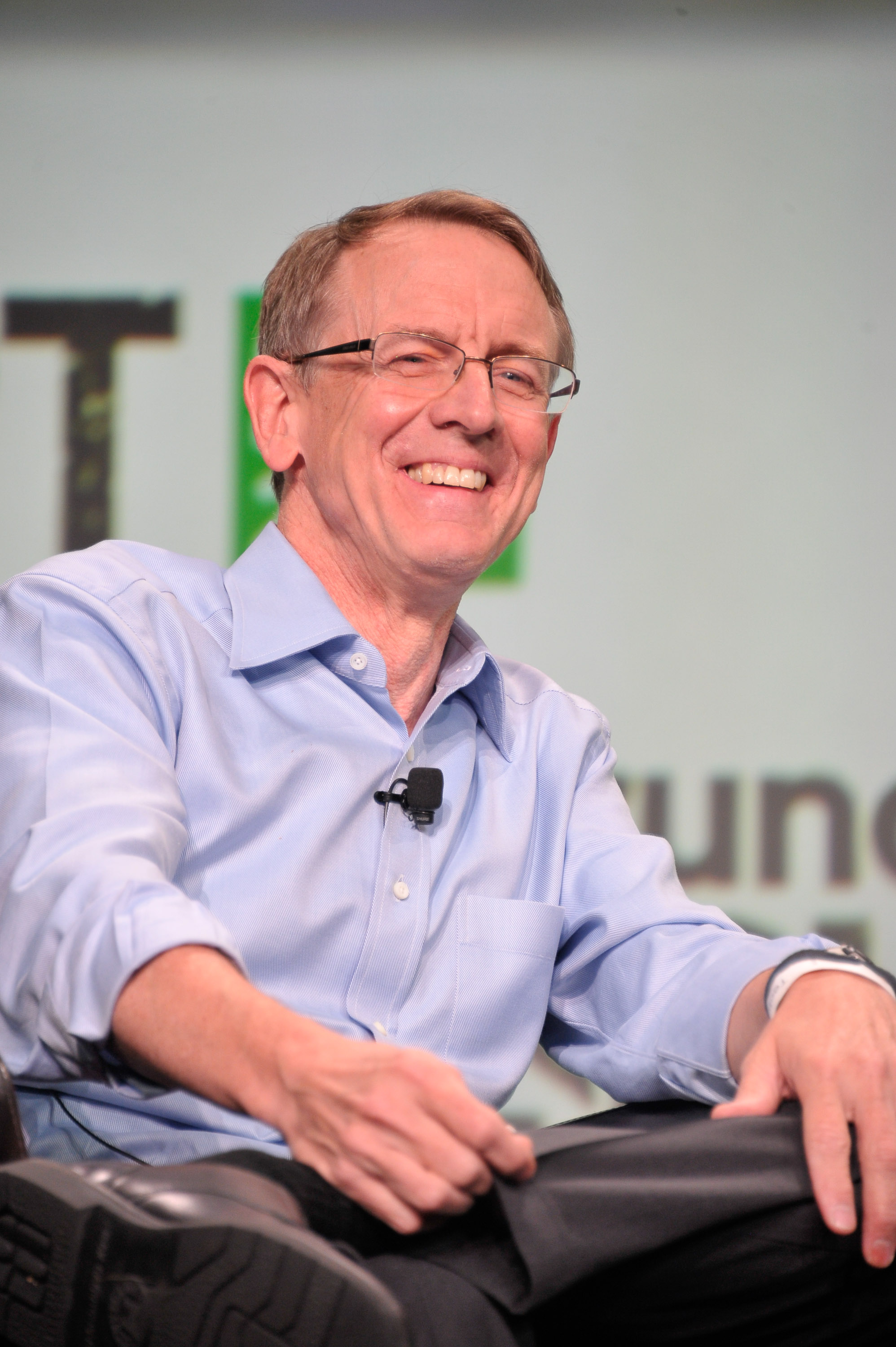
- Doerr at Techcrunch Disrupt 2013, in San Francisco
- Born: Louis John Doerr; June 29, 1951 (age 75); St. Louis, Missouri, U.S.
- Education: Rice University (BS, MEng); Harvard University (MBA)
- Political party: Democratic
- Spouse: Ann Howland
- Children: 2

Louis John Doerr (born June 29, 1951) is an American investor and venture capitalist at Kleiner Perkins in Menlo Park, California. In February 2009, Doerr was appointed a member of the President's Economic Recovery Advisory Board to provide the President and his administration with advice and counsel in trying to fix America's economic downturn. Doerr is the author of Measure What Matters, a book about goal-setting, and Speed & Scale: An Action Plan for Solving Our Climate Crisis Now.

In 2022, John and his wife Ann collaborated with Stanford University to launch its first new school in approximately 70 years: Stanford Doerr School of Sustainability. Forbes ranked Doerr as the 40th wealthiest person in tech in 2017, and as of August 1, 2023, as the 146th wealthiest person in the world, with a net worth of US$11.9 billion.

== Early life and education ==
Louis John Doerr was born in St. Louis, Missouri, United States on June 29, 1951, as the son of a German immigrant. One of five siblings, Doerr graduated from Chaminade College Preparatory School in St. Louis. Doerr obtained a B.S. and an M.E.E. degree in electrical engineering from Rice University and an MBA from Harvard Business School in 1976.

== Career ==
Doerr joined Intel Corporation in 1974 just as the firm was developing the 8080 8-bit microprocessor. He eventually became one of Intel's most successful salespeople. He also holds several patents for memory devices. In 1980, Doerr was offered a job with Kleiner Perkins. Intel president Andrew Grove told him, "John, venture capital, that's not a real job. It's like being a real estate agent."

He joined Kleiner Perkins that year, and since then has directed the distribution of venture capital funding to technology companies including Compaq, Netscape, Symantec, Sun Microsystems, drugstore.com, Amazon.com, Intuit, Macromedia, and Google. Doerr introduced the idea of Objectives and key results (OKRs) to Google.

Doerr has backed entrepreneurs, including Larry Page, Sergey Brin, and Eric Schmidt of Google; Jeff Bezos of Amazon.com; and Scott Cook and Bill Campbell of Intuit.

=== Venture funding ===
Doerr co-founded and serves on the board of the New Schools Venture Fund, an education reform and charter public schools fund, and TechNet, a policy network of high-tech CEOs advocating education and litigation reform, and policies for the innovation economy. Doerr co-chaired California's Proposition 39 which lowered the threshold to approved school bonds, and Proposition 71 which created $3 billion in funding for California research into stem cell therapies. He serves on the board of Bono's ONE campaign to fight global poverty, particularly disease in Africa. His success in venture capital has garnered national attention; he has been listed on Forbes magazine's exclusive "Midas List" and is widely regarded as one of the top technology venture capitalists in the world.

Doerr advocates innovation in sustainable energy technologies to combat climate change and has written and testified on the topic. In a 2007 TED conference, he cited his daughter's remark, "your generation created this problem, you better fix it", as a call to fight global warming.

In 2008, he announced with Steve Jobs the Kleiner Perkins $100 million iFund, declaring the iPhone "more important than the personal computer" because "it knows who you are" and "where you are." In April 2010, he along with other iFund members announced an increase in iFund's value by another $100 million, making iFund the world's biggest investment pool in the cell phone application industry.

He currently serves on the boards of Google's parent company Alphabet Inc., Watershed, Amyris Biotech, Tradesy, ASAPP, and Zynga. Doerr led Kleiner Perkins's $150 million investment in Twitter in 2012.

In 2013, he invested in DreamBox, which has been acquired by Charter School Growth Fund. He had also funded the initial investments in Bloom Energy Inc. Doerr is a major backer of the education company Remind.

In 2016, Doerr stepped down from his role leading Kleiner Perkins, ceding leadership to Ted Schlein.

Doerr mentored Ellen Pao when she first joined Kleiner Perkins.

Doerr serves on the board of the Obama Foundation and ONE.org.

== Economic Recovery Advisory Board ==
In February 2009, Doerr was appointed as a member of the US Economic Recovery Advisory Board by President Barack Obama to provide the President and his administration with advice and counsel in fixing America's economic downturn.

== Personal life ==
Doerr is married to Ann Howland Doerr. They live in Woodside, California, with their two children.

In August 2010, they signed the Giving Pledge, a campaign set up by the Bill & Melinda Gates Foundation and Warren Buffett to get ultra-high-net-worth individuals to donate their fortunes to charitable causes within their lifetime.

In 1997, Doerr was named a Distinguished Alumnus of Rice University for his accomplishments in business. In 2009, Doerr was named a Fellow of the American Academy of Arts & Sciences. In 2010, Doerr was inducted into the California Hall of Fame. In 2019, Doerr received the Golden Plate Award of the American Academy of Achievement. In 2026, he was elected a member of the National Academy of Engineering.

He is also member of the Global Advisory Board of Khan Academy.

On May 4, 2022, Stanford University announced Ann and John Doerr's donation of $1.1 billion to establish the Stanford Doerr School of Sustainability. The gift is the second largest to an academic institution—the first being Michael Bloomberg's $1.8 billion gift to Johns Hopkins University. It is the largest gift to Stanford in the university's history.

== Politics ==
Doerr is a supporter of the Democratic Party and has hosted fundraisers for the party on several occasions. Along with Mark Zuckerberg and Reid Hoffman, John Doerr was a co-founder of FWD.us, a lobbying group focused on immigration reform, improvements in education, and scientific research. He has also donated $30 million to No on Prop 40.
