= Karen Panetta =

American computer engineer

Karen Ann Panetta
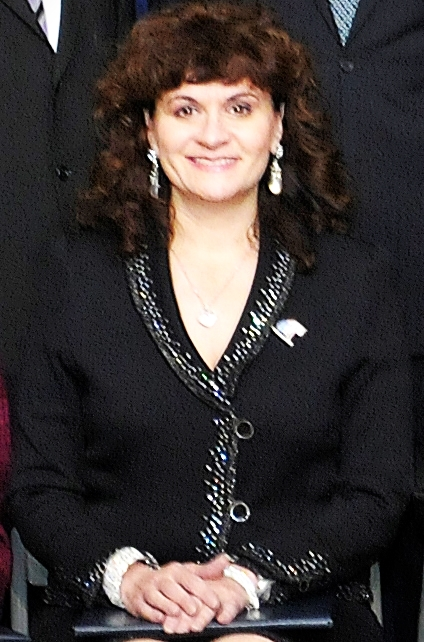
- Panetta among the 2011 PAESMEM honorees
- Education: Northeastern University; Boston University
- Scientific career
- Workplaces: Tufts University
- Thesis: Multiple domain concurrent simulation of interacting experiments and its application to multiple stuck-at fault simulation (1994)

Karen Ann Panetta is an American computer engineer and inventor who is a professor and Dean of Graduate Education at Tufts University. Her research considers machine learning and automated systems. She is a Fellow of the Institute of Electrical and Electronics Engineers, the American Institute of Aeronautics and Astronautics, and the National Academy of Inventors. She is a member of the National Academy of Engineering, and Fellow of the European Academy of Sciences and the Arts, and the Asia-Pacific Artificial Intelligence Association. She was the STEM Advisor to President Joyce Banda of Malawi and U.S. Ambassador Linda Blanchard to Slovenia.

== Early life and education ==
As a child, Panetta was always intrigued by the desire to find the solutions to problems. Her father, despite lacking a college education of his own, encouraged Panetta to pursue engineering. He encouraged her with a promise of financial independence and increased spending once she got older. When she got older, Panetta became an undergraduate student at Boston University, receiving a B.S. in computer engineering . She then moved to Northeastern University for her master's degree. Panetta remained at Northeastern for her doctoral studies, working on information systems and robotics. Both her master's and Ph.D. were paid for by the Digital Equipment Corporation (DEC), in exchange for her returning to academia as a Professor and researcher. The DEC believed that if more real engineers were put back into college as teachers, students would receive a better education surrounding the science, which could be more easily applied to real-world issues and challenges. Panetta transformed engineering education at Tufts University, bringing the School's first formal Engineering industry internship program, and incorporating entrepreneurship as part of the Graduate curriculum.

== Research and career ==
In 1994, Panetta joined Tufts University School of Engineering, where she became the first female engineer to be awarded tenure in the Department of Electrical and Computer Engineering. Panetta develops signal and image processing algorithms. She is particularly interested in approaches for robot vision and biomedical imaging. Her primary areas of research include Artificial Intelligence, Machine Learning, automated systems, and visual sensing systems.

Panetta created an autonomous software that can benefit medical diagnostics. Amongst the pieces of software developed by Panetta, she created a piece that can identify pneumonia caused by COVID-19, and another that can provide detailed information to dentists about areas of the mouth that need attention.

== Innovations ==
While working at the Digital Equipment Corporation (DEC), Panetta created algorithms that were instrumental in creating the first complete digital twin of a CPU design, which could run multiple software programs that have redefined semi-conductor manufacturing and test processes. Panetta also created multiple patented underwater imaging measures and algorithms that are used by companies and organizations for underwater search and rescue, as well as ocean exploration operations. Panetta's other innovations include a parametric logarithmic image processing operators and image quality measures that emulate human vision, allowing computers to view similarly to a human, and perceive humans more clearly. Panetta's work with enhanced robotic vision, for purposes such as biomedical use, makes use of artificial intelligence. With her innovations, she addressed the pain point of computer and robot's inability to sufficiently process real-world visuals, as perceived by the human eye. Part of her inspiration for this project was the events that transpired during 9/11, leading to her desire to create an image/video enhancement in real time for safety and security applications. Panetta also worked on the creation of a human visual system quality assessment to ensure the best visual image is used for analysis. Panetta also created edge detection algorithms, in order to maintain the important features of objects whilst removing irrelevant data, thus aiding airport screeners interpreting objects, radiologists detecting cancerous tissue, and more. Panetta's research has been had an immense impact on biomedical, security, and agricultural fields, including with Cancer detection, homeland security, food safety, and more.

== Lasting Impact ==
Throughout her life, Panetta's goal with her work has been to use engineering to have a positive impact. Her research in imaging, computer visual processing, artificial intelligence, and more, have had significant impacts on several fields, including that of security, agriculture, biomedicine, and more. Additionally, Panetta has pursued intentionally humanitarian efforts. She has used her visual technology and developed AI-equipped drones to monitor elephants, in order to learn the best environment for their safety, away from poachers, farm areas, etc. She also done humanitarian work in areas regarding autism, health care education in Liberia, and human trafficking.

== Academic service ==
Panetta is committed to improving the representation of women in engineering. She was appointed the worldwide director for the Institute of Electrical and Electronics Engineers (IEEE) Women in Engineering program and editor-in-chief of the Women in Engineering magazine. In 1999, Panetta founded Nerd Girls, a platform dedicated to challenging stereotypes about women scientists, and encouraging more young women to pursue engineering and science. Today, Panetta's Nerd Girls program is a national multimedia enterprise, including the Nerd Girl Nation enterprise. She is also the co-author of Count Girls In, a book for families that looks to encourage parents to raise "authentic" young women.

== Awards and honors ==
- 2011 Anita Borg Institute Women of Vision Award
- 2012 Presidential Award for Excellence in Science, Mathematics, and Engineering Mentoring
- 2013 William E. Sayle II Award for Achievement in Education
- 2013 IEEE Award for Distinguished Ethical Practices
- 2020 IEEE-USA Award for Distinguished Literary Contributions Furthering Public Understanding and the Advancement of the Engineering Profession
- 2021 Elected to the National Academy of Inventors
- 2026 IEEE Mildred Dresselhaus Medal

== Selected publications ==
- Sos S Agaian; Blair Silver; Karen A Panetta (2007). "Transform coefficient histogram-based image enhancement algorithms using contrast entropy". IEEE Transactions on Image Processing. 16 (3): 741–758. doi:10.1109/tip.2006.888338. PMID 17357734. Wikidata Q51049039.
- S S Agaian; K Panetta; A M Grigoryan (2001). "Transform-based image enhancement algorithms with performance measure". IEEE Transactions on Image Processing. 10 (3): 367–382. doi:10.1109/83.908502. PMID 18249627. Zbl 1036.68605. Wikidata Q46771905.
- Karen A Panetta; Eric J Wharton; Sos S Agaian (2008). "Human visual system-based image enhancement and logarithmic contrast measure". IEEE Transactions on Systems, Man, and Cybernetics. 38 (1): 174–188. doi:10.1109/tsmcb.2007.909440. PMID 18270089. Wikidata Q47916916.
