= Remand =

Remand may refer to:

- Remand (court procedure), when an appellate court sends a case back to the trial court or lower appellate court
- Pre-trial detention, detention of a suspect prior to a trial, conviction, or sentencing

== See also ==
- Remando al viento
- Remanence
- Ramand District
- Remind
- Reprimand
