= FBN =

FBN may refer to:

== Broadcasting ==
- Faith Broadcasting Network, an American Christian television network
- Fox Business Network, an American cable television network
- Fundamental Broadcasting Network, an American Christian radio network

== Other uses ==
- Farmers Business Network, a farmer-to-farmer network and e-commerce platform
- Federal Bureau of Narcotics, a former agency of the United States Department of the Treasury
- Feminist Bookstore News, a trade publication for feminist bookstores
- Fibrillin
- First Bank of Nigeria
