= ChowNow =

Online food ordering platform

ChowNow, Inc.
- Type: Private
- Industry: Online platform for restaurant pick-up and delivery
- Founded: 2011
- Founder: Christopher Webb and Eric Jaffe
- Headquarters: Los Angeles, California, United States
- Key people: Christopher Webb (CEO), Eric Jaffe (COO).
- Website: get.chownow.com

ChowNow is an online food ordering platform that connects customers with local restaurants. Christopher Webb and Eric Jaffe, American entrepreneurs, founded the company in 2011 with headquarters in Los Angeles, California.

== History ==
The company ChowNow was founded in 2011 by Christopher Webb, a former employee of RBC Bank and Lehman Brothers; and Eric Jaffe, a former commercial real estate investor. The platform was launched in March 2012.

In January 2013, ChowNow raised over US$4 million, including funding from accelerator Launchpad LA. The same year, ChowNow, initially part of the incubator Launchpad LA, closed a seed round of $1 million from GRP Partners, James Bailey and angel investors. For its expansion and product improvement, it further raised 10 million US dollars in venture funding in a round led by Upfront Ventures. In October 2017, ChowNow raised $20 million U.S. dollars in a Series B round led by Catalyst Investors, bringing ChowNow's total funding to 40 million U.S. dollars. ChowNow's other notable investors include GRP Partners, Canyon Creek Capital, Clark Landry, Daher Capital, Double M Partners, Karlin Ventures, Launchpad LA, Tiller Partners, Upfront Ventures, Velos Partners.

In June 2016, ChowNow partnered with Uber and Postmates to enhance its services with an order delivery feature called Flex Delivery service. In August of the same year, ChowNow introduced a feature that allows potential diners to place orders directly from Google search results, including thousands of restaurants across U.S. and Canada. In October 2016, ChowNow teamed up with Squarespace, a SaaS content management system and website builder platform, to enable restaurants with ChowNow's entire suite of online ordering tools. In May 2018, ChowNow released a feature that allows customers to place orders via a restaurant's Instagram profile.

In March 2024, it was announced ChowNow had acquired the Victoria, Canada–headquartered point-of-sale food ordering platform, Cuboh, for an undisclosed amount.

== Overview ==
ChowNow's online ordering technology enables independent restaurants to take orders via their own branded channels. The company was launched in March 2012 at the National Restaurant Show in Chicago and currently partners with thousands of restaurants in 50 states in U.S.

In addition to operating a consumer-facing platform, ChowNow allows restaurants to individually customize and brand their ordering apps. Restaurants can use ChowNow's online ordering technology to take orders directly through their Facebook page and Instagram profile.

== Operation ==
ChowNow operates on a SaaS model where restaurants subscribe on a monthly basis. The company does not prepare or deliver food, its approach not only offers financial relief but also shifts power back to restaurants. As the restaurant receives the order on its website, mobile app, Facebook, or Google page, ChowNow processes the order and communicates back to the diner for pickup or delivery. Last, ChowNow collects information from diners' orders and provides this information to the restaurants for remarketing. The user places an order from an online menu displayed on ChowNow's interface. Upon receiving confirmation of a diner's order through the integrated Apple Pay, Yelp or Google Wallet, the system forwards it to the selected restaurant. As it receives the order on its Facebook page website, or Instagram, this restaurant processes it and communicates back to the diner for delivery. Last, ChowNow collects information from diners' orders for its data analytics.
