= Neha Narkhede =

Indian

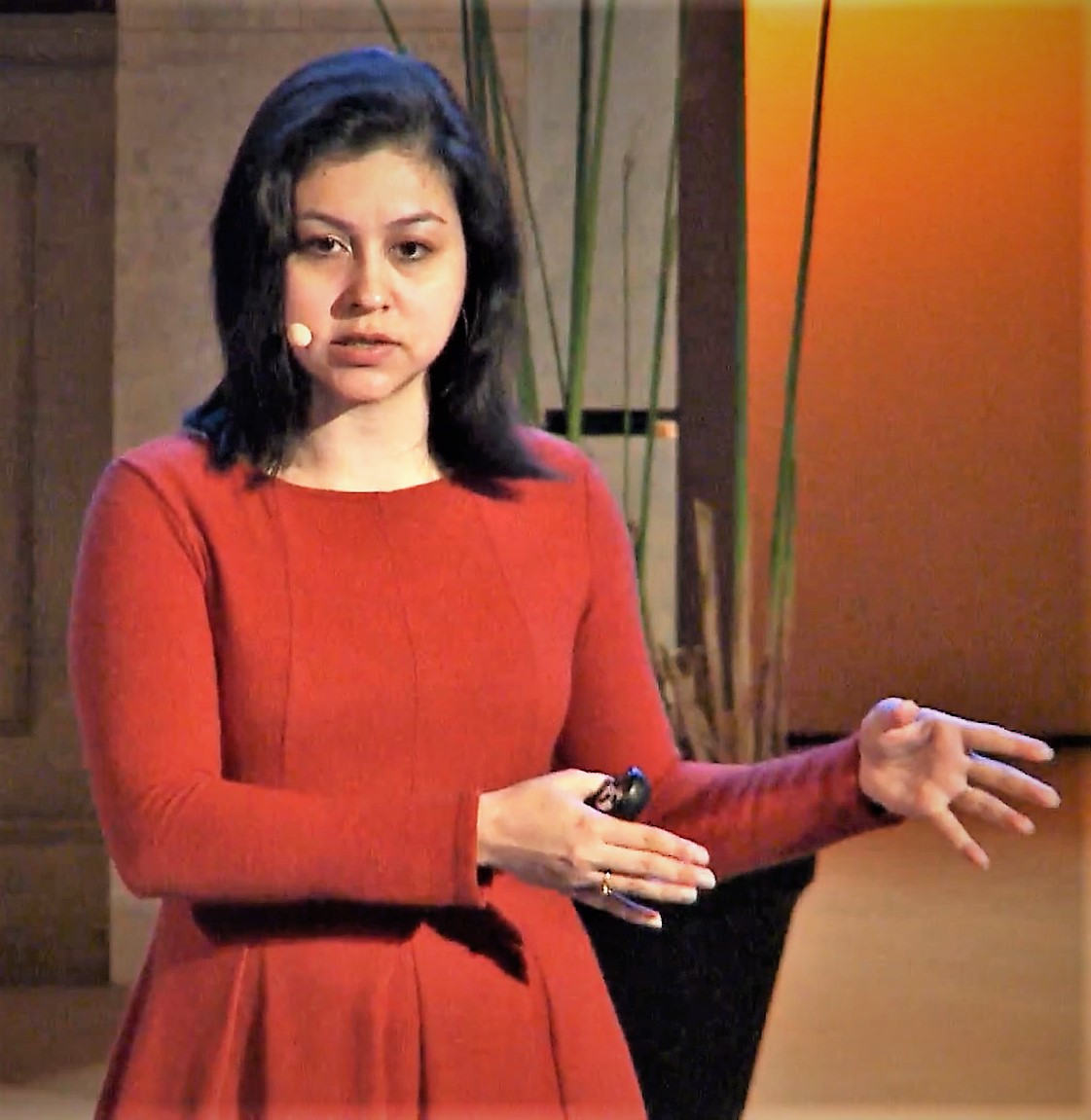
- Narkhede speaking at dotScale 2017
- Born: 1984 or 1985 (age 41–42); Pune, Maharashtra, India
- Education: Pune Institute of Computer Technology (PICT), University of Pune; Georgia Tech

Neha Narkhede (born 1984 or 1985) is an American technology entrepreneur and the co-founder and former CTO of Confluent, a streaming data technology company. She co-created the open source software platform Apache Kafka. Narkhede now serves as a board member of Confluent. She co-founded risk detection platform developer, Oscilar, in 2021, where she is the CEO. In 2020, she was listed as one of America’s Self-Made Women by Forbes.

== Education ==
Narkhede was raised in Pune, Maharashtra and went to the Pune Institute of Computer Technology (PICT), University of Pune, where she gained a Bachelor of Engineering. In 2007, she received a masters in technology from Georgia Tech.

== Career ==
After obtaining her master's degree, Narkhede started her first job at Oracle as a software engineer. After Oracle, she worked as the lead of streams infrastructure at LinkedIn.

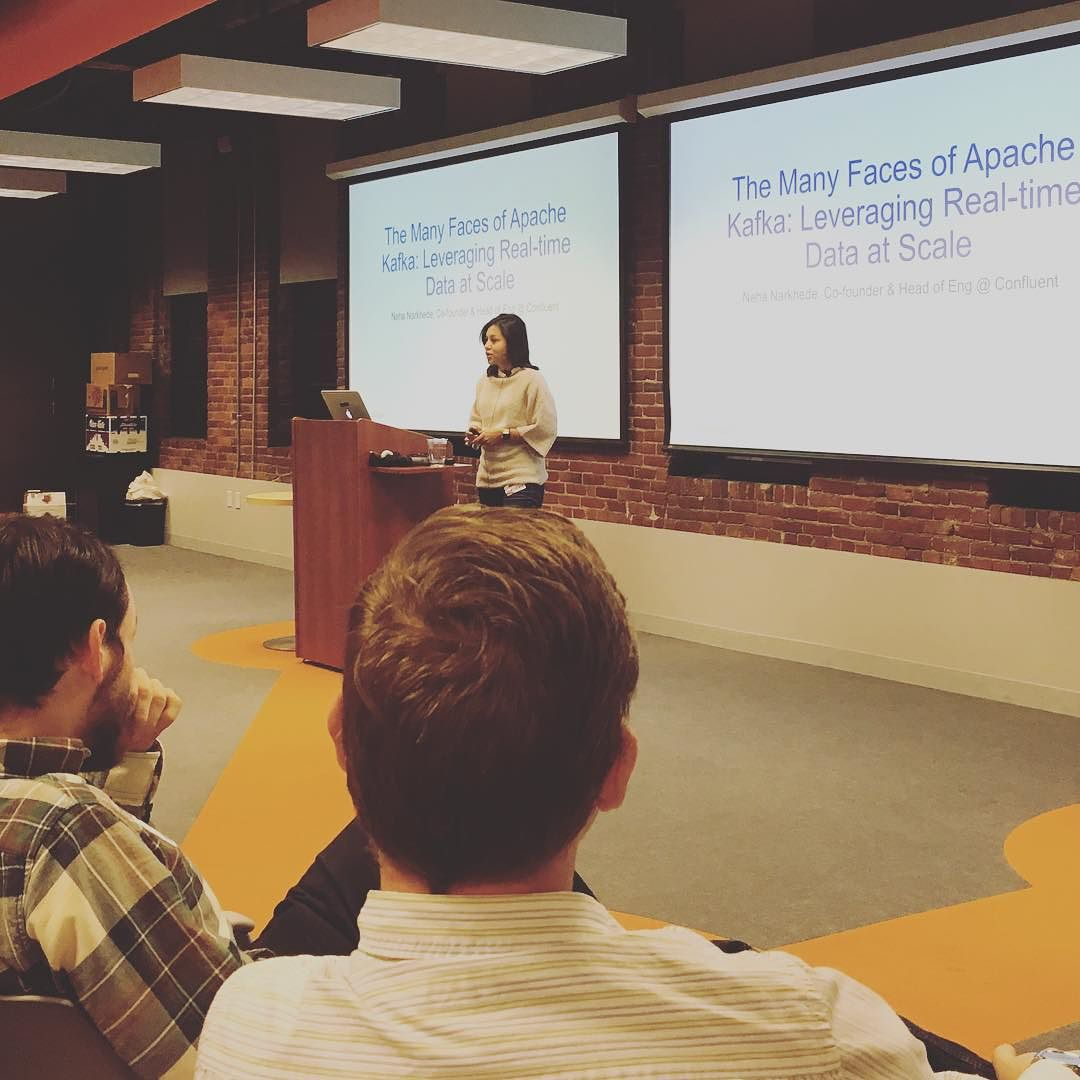
Neha Narkhede talking about Apache Kafka in 2015

While working at LinkedIn in 2011, Narkhede created the Platform Apache Kafka, along with Jun Rao and Jay Kreps. They came up with the idea while on a project at the company and developed Kafka as an open source Platform. In 2014 she founded Confluent, a Palo Alto based startup, along with Rao and Kreps and decided to start Confluent as a B2B infrastructure company.

In 2017 she co-authored Kafka: The Definitive Guide along with Gwen Shapira and Todd Palino which is about the technology that created Kafka.

She was the CTO of Confluent and later also took upon the role of chief product officer until 2020, but remained as a board member.

She and her team at Confluent raised $125 million in 2019, bringing its total funding to $206 million in 2019. And in April 2020, the company raised $250 million bringing its total funding to $456 million.

Confluent filed for an initial public offering on June 1, 2021, and was valued at $4.5 billion. Companies such as Goldman Sachs, Netflix and Uber use the platform for data driven purposes.

Narkhede and her husband co-founded Oscilar in 2021, which develops a real-time artificial intelligence-based platform to help decrease the risks involved with online transactions. The company came out of stealth mode two years later, with Narkhede as CEO.

== Recognition ==
In 2017, MIT Technology Review listed her as one of the innovators under 35. In the following year Narkhede was listed as one of America's and the world's top 50 Women in Tech by Forbes and she won the Oracle Groundbreaker Award at the Oracle Code One conference in San Francisco. In October 2020, Narkhede was listed #33 on the list of "America's Self Made Women" by Forbes. In 2022, Narkhede received the Abie Award for Technology Entrepreneurship Award Winner at the Grace Hopper Celebration of Women in Computing from Anitab.

== Personal life ==
Narkhede is married to Sachin Kulkarni, an engineering executive, with whom she has a son and daughter.
