= Mark Suster =

American businessman

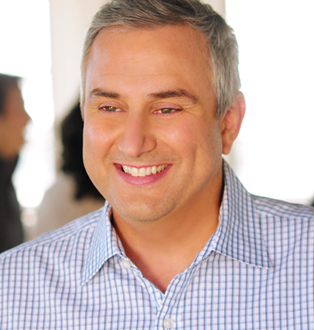
- Born: April 30, 1968 (age 58)
- Education: University of Chicago (M.B.A.); University of California at San Diego (B.A.)
- Occupations: Businessman, investor
- Spouse: Tania Suster
- Children: 2

Mark Suster (born April 30, 1968) is an American businessman and investor. He is a managing partner at Upfront Ventures, the largest venture capital firm in Los Angeles. Aside from his business career, Suster is also a prominent blogger in the American high-technology startup scene and venture capital world.

== Business career ==
In 1999, with Ireland-based real estate entrepreneur Brian Moran, he created his first company, a construction collaboration technology business called BuildOnline, where he was also chief executive officer. BuildOnline merged with US-based rival Citadon in December 2006.

By September 2006, Suster had already left Citadon, having established a second company called Koral, a content collaboration software business. In April 2007, Koral was acquired by Salesforce.com where Suster then assumed the role of Vice President of Product Management upon the completion of the acquisition.

Suster later joined Upfront Ventures (previously known as GRP Partners), a venture capital and investment firm, in 2007. In 2009, Suster started the Launchpad LA accelerator while continuing his employment at Upfront. At Upfront, Suster led investments in companies including Ring, Bird, Invoca, ThreadUp, MakeSpace, mitu, Nanit, Osmo, Tact, and uBeam.

Suster also led the initial funding round for, and was on the board of, Maker Studios, an online video talent agency (acquired by Disney in 2014). He was also an early investor in online car-shopping system TrueCar, which went public that same year. Unlike other Silicon Valley technology entrepreneurs, Suster has been open about turning down investments in potential start-up businesses that later became successful, including Uber.

In February 2023, Suster said an excess of capital in the startup market was keeping many startups afloat. Of 5,000 early-stage companies Upfront Ventures had funded since 2019, half were at risk of going out of business, he said. Less than a month later (11 March 2023), Suster called for calm as investors became concerned about the collapse of Silicon Valley Bank, suggesting a "handful" of VCs were creating panic.

Suster and Upfront are hosts of the Upfront Summit, an invite-only VC conference in Los Angeles. The event brings more than 1,000 attendees each year and have taken place in locations such as Paramount Studios, the Rose Bowl, and Dolby Theatre.

Investors including Upfront Ventures/Suster have been in lawsuits brought by Loot Crate and Maker Studios.

== Personal life ==
Suster grew up in Northern California and is a dual citizen of both the United Kingdom and the United States. He is of Romanian Jewish ancestry. Suster graduated from the University of California, San Diego with a Bachelor of Arts in Economics. He later received his MBA from the University of Chicago's Booth School of Business.

Since he was diagnosed with ADHD in 2014, Suster has openly talked and written often about how he's learned to integrate his business skills with his coping strategies for ADHD.

Suster is married with two children.

In 2026, Suster was reported to have laid tefillin with Chabad activist Yossi Farro during the week of the Milken Institute Global Conference in Los Angeles.
