= Confluent =

American multinational technology corporation

Confluent, Inc.
- Type: Public
- Traded as: Nasdaq: CFLT; Russell 1000 component
- ISIN: US20717M1036
- Industry: Information technology
- Founded: September 23, 2014; 12 years ago, in Silicon Valley, U.S.
- Founders: Jay Kreps; Jun Rao; Neha Narkhede
- Headquarters: Mountain View, California, U.S.
- Area served: Worldwide
- Key people: Jay Kreps (CEO); Jun Rao; Erica Ruliffson Schultz (president of Field Operations)
- Products: Software development; Cloud computing; Internet
- Services: Confluent Cloud; Confluent Platform
- Revenue: ▲US$$0.963 billion (FY 2024)
- Net income: ▲US$−0.345 billion (2024)
- Total assets: ▼US$2.46 billion (2024)
- Total equity: ▼US$.810 billion (2024)
- Number of employees: 3,263 (Q3 2025)
- Parent: IBM
- Website: confluent.io

Confluent, Inc. is an American technology company headquartered in Mountain View, California.

It was founded by Jay Kreps, Jun Rao and Neha Narkhede on September 23, 2014, in order to commercialize an open-source streaming platform Apache Kafka, created by the same founders while working at LinkedIn in 2008 as a B2B infrastructure company.

Confluent's products are the Confluent Cloud, Confluent Platform, Connectors, Apache Flink, Stream Governance and Confluent Hub. In 2025, it launched Confluent Intelligence, a fully managed service on Confluent Cloud providing AI-powered capabilities including anomaly detection, fraud detection, and forecasting for real-time data streams.

Corporation filed for an IPO on June 1, 2021 with a valuation of $4.5 billion. IBM announced the acquisition of Confluent at a $11 billion valuation on December 8, 2025. The deal completed on March 17, 2026.
