= Writer Inc. =

Company

- Type: Private
- Industry: Technology; Software as a service
- Founded: 2020
- Founder: May Habib; Waseem AlShikh
- Headquarters: San Francisco, California, United States
- Products: Full-stack generative AI platform
- Services: Natural language processing; AI writing assistant; Content intelligence
- Website: writer.com

WRITER is a generative AI company based in San Francisco, California that offers a full-stack generative AI platform for enterprises. In September 2023, WRITER raised $100m in a Series B led by ICONIQ Growth with participation from Insight Partners, WndrCo, Balderton Capital, and Aspect Ventures. The co-founders also worked together on Qordoba, a previous startup.

== History ==
Qordoba was incorporated in the U.S. in 2015 by May Habib, a Lebanese entrepreneur, and Waseem AlShikh, a Syrian entrepreneur. The two then started WRITER, Inc. in August 2020.

In February 2023, WRITER launched three large language models — Palmyra-Small with 128 million parameters, Palmyra-Base with 5 billion parameters, and Palmyra-Large with 20 billion parameters (named after the ancient Syrian city of Palmyra). In May 2023, WRITER announced Knowledge Graph, a new offering that connects business data sources to its LLMs, and the ability for customers to self-host WRITER-built LLMs.

WRITER is a privately held company, supported by investments from ICONIQ Growth, Insight Partners, WndrCo, Balderton Capital, Aspect Ventures, Gradient Ventures, Rincon Venture Partners, Upfront Ventures and Broadway Angels.
