= Jessie Woolley-Wilson =

- Born: Texarkana, Texas, U.S.
- Education: University of Virginia (BA); Harvard University (MBA)
- Known for: CEO of DreamBox

Jessie Woolley-Wilson is the President, CEO, and Board Chair of DreamBox. She has worked in K-12 educational technology for nearly 20 years, and she has worked at DreamBox, Netflix and Facebook since 2010.

== Early life and education ==
Born in Texarkana, Texas, and raised in Wilmington, Delaware, Jessie studied at the Ursuline Academy, then joined the University of Virginia where she received a Bachelor of Arts in English, then earned her M.B.A from Harvard Business School.

== Career ==
Jessie started her career at Chase Manhattan Bank, specifically working at its Third World Debt Restructuring Group, and later worked at American Express. Prior to joining DreamBox, she served as President of LeapFrog Enterprises from 2004–2005 and President of Blackboard Inc.'s K-12 Group from 2007-2010.

In 2010, she joined DreamBox Learning as Chair, President, and CEO.

She sits on the board of directors of Rosetta Stone and other education organizations.

== Awards and recognition ==
In 2012, Jessie was named one of Forbes' Impact 15 in education for her work at DreamBox. She won the EdTech Digest's EdTech Leadership Award two times, for her work in improving innovation in education technology. She was included in the Aspen Institute's 2007 class of Henry Crown Fellows and became moderator of the Aspen Institute. Regionally, she received many accolades and awards for her leadership roles, including the Seattle Business Magazine's Executive Excellence Award in 2015 in the CEO category, and GeekWire’s 2019 Big Tech CEO of the Year.
