= Yuqing Gao =

Chinese computer scientist

- Education: Southeast University (Ph.D.)
- Known for: Speech-to-speech translation
- Awards: IEEE Fellow (2009); Women of Vision Award for Innovation (2009)
- Scientific career
- Fields: Computer science, artificial intelligence, natural language processing
- Workplaces: Cisco; Google; Amazon Web Services; Microsoft; IBM; Apple Computer

Yuqing Gao is a computer scientist whose research and engineering work has included speech recognition, speech-to-speech translation, natural language processing, enterprise computing, and knowledge graphs. She is a Fellow of the IEEE and, as of 2026, serves as a senior director of AI engineering and research at Cisco.

== Biography ==
Gao received a Ph.D. in electrical engineering from Southeast University in Nanjing in 1989. She subsequently worked at the National Laboratory of Pattern Recognition of the Chinese Academy of Sciences and as a postdoctoral researcher in Nancy, France. From 1993 to 1995, she worked on speech-recognition research at the Apple-ISS Research Center in Singapore before joining the Thomas J. Watson Research Center at IBM in 1995.

At IBM, Gao worked on large-vocabulary speech recognition and multilingual speech translation. She was part of the team that developed MASTOR, the Multilingual Automatic Speech-to-Speech Translator, which performed free-form spoken-language translation on laptops and handheld devices. IBM states that a team led by Gao collaborated with the United States Department of Defense on MASTOR during the Iraq War. Her speech-translation research was also discussed in contemporary coverage of emerging machine-translation technologies.

Her later IBM research also included enterprise middleware and data-centric computing, and she became an IBM Distinguished Engineer.

After IBM, Gao worked at Microsoft, where her work included large-scale knowledge graphs and enterprise search. In 2019 she coauthored a Communications of the ACM article comparing industrial-scale knowledge graphs, including Microsoft's Bing knowledge graph.

She later held engineering and research leadership roles at Amazon Web Services and Google. At Amazon, her work included Amazon SageMaker JumpStart and Canvas; at Google, it included generative-AI grounding and summarization for Google Search. In 2024 she joined Cisco, where she works in AI research and engineering.

== Awards ==
Her notable awards include:

- IEEE Fellow (2009).
- Anita Borg Institute Women of Vision Award for Innovation (2009).
