= Thrive Market =

American e-commerce membership-based retailer

- Industry: Retail
- Founded: 2014
- Founders: Nick Green; Gunnar Lovelace; Sasha Siddhartha; Kate Mulling
- Headquarters: Los Angeles, California
- Area served: United States
- Products: Consumer goods
- Website: thrivemarket.com

Thrive Market is an American e-commerce membership-based retailer offering natural and organic food products. It was founded by Nick Green, Gunnar Lovelace, Kate Mulling, and Sasha Siddhartha. By 2016 they had raised $141 million across three funding rounds following their launch in November 2014.

Described as "Costco meets Whole Foods", Thrive Market's business model is designed to simplify the supply chain by eliminating the markup typically applied by brick-and-mortar grocery stores.

== Operations ==
=== Membership Model ===
Thrive Market is based on an annual membership model, which allows the company to keep prices low. Thrive Market offers incentives with membership including discounts, gifts, exclusive product collaborations, and samples with orders. For every paid Thrive Market membership, a free membership is donated to a family in need in the United States as part of the company's Thrive Gives program. Students, teachers, veterans, nurses, and first responders are also eligible for free memberships. Thrive Market membership is popular amongst parents.

=== Shopping on Thrive Market ===
Thrive Market carries more than 6,900 products from over 800 brands, including organic and non-GMO foods, ethically sourced meat and seafood, nontoxic home and beauty products, organic and biodynamic wine, and items for babies and kids. Thrive also offers around 700 of its own products, available exclusively to members. The company allows users to filter their search results by more than 90 different diets and lifestyle choices. Examples of filters include vegan, paleo, keto, gluten-free, Fair Trade Certified, and Non-GMO Project Verified. As of September 4, 2019, Thrive Market is the first retailer to use the Glyphosate Residue Free certification, created by the Detox Project, a research and certification platform.

=== Sustainability Certifications ===
In October 2020, Thrive became the first online grocer in the U.S. with B Corp certification from B-Lab.

In January 2023, Thrive Market's Hanover, Pennsylvania-based fulfillment center was awarded certification under the TRUE (Total Resource Use and Efficiency), the third and final fulfillment center to be TRUE certified. Also in 2023, Thrive Market became plastic-neutral and climate-neutral certified. Also in 2023, Thrive Market converted from a C-corporation to a Delaware Public Benefit Corporation. Since 2015, the company has offset 100% of its carbon footprint from shipping and has a no airship policy.

=== Thrive Gives Program and Donations ===
Since 2015, Thrive Market has given away millions of memberships. In 2020, Thrive Market announced its Food Equality Now campaign, which is set to reach $20M by 2030.

== History ==
Thrive Market was launched in November 2014 to address the geographical and monetary challenges that bar communities from healthy food. Green and Lovelace met via Green's involvement in Launchpad LA. Lovelace grew up on an organic farm in Ojai, California and saw the power of group buying as a way to make healthy food affordable and build community.

When Green and Lovelace initially tried to raise money for Thrive Market, they were rejected by more than 50 venture-capital firms. They then focused on building a network of more than 200 health and wellness investors—including Deepak Chopra, Tony Robbins, and Jillian Michaels—to support Thrive Market individually. As of 2016, Thrive Market has raised $141 million from Greycroft Partners, E-Ventures, Cross Culture Ventures, and Invus.

Thrive Market has three fulfillment centers from which distribution is made, one at Batesville, Indiana, and another at Tahoe Reno Industrial Center near Reno, Nevada. The most recent center opened in 2021 in Hanover Township, PA. They advertise delivery to 85% of the United States within two days. The company currently employs more than 500 people.

In 2016, the company raised a $111M Series B led by Invus. At the time, the company had 300,000 paying members and sold $200,000 worth of goods per day. That February, Thrive Market launched a mobile app, available for iOS and Android systems.

In June 2016, Thrive Market launched an online petition asking the USDA to accept food stamps online. Soon after the petition launched, Gunnar Lovelace participated in a congressional briefing hosted by Congressman Tim Ryan and actress-activist Shailene Woodley. Lovelace also met with Senior Nutrition Policy Advisor Debra Eschmeyer and USDA officials in the White House. On September 25, 2016, the USDA announced plans for its pilot program for online shopping and called for volunteers to apply for participation.

Thrive Market launched 165 self-branded products in 2018. Thrive Market grew rapidly during the COVID-19 pandemic. Revenues grew by 90%.

In 2021, it was reported Thrive sought a valuation of over $2 billion while considering going public. Two of Thrive's three distribution centers were TRUE-certified in 2021.

As of November 2022, Thrive Market serves 1.2 million members. In April 2023, Thrive Market converted to a Public-benefit corporation. On February 26, 2024, Thrive Market became the first online-only grocer to accept SNAP EBT.

As of March 2025, Thrive Market was doing over $700 million in annual sales, carried over 750 brands, and had over 1.6 million paying members.

== Products ==
Thrive Market is the largest national retailer of exclusively non-GMO foods. They launched their own product line in November 2015, aiming to develop affordable products in categories where there is not enough margin to cover cost. They currently offer more than over 800 different Thrive Market branded items by SKUs, including coconut oil, tomato sauce, olive oil, baking goods, and spices. Thrive has launched two new Thrive sub-brands, Rosey and f.a.e. Rosey which are a line of home cleaning products and constitutes over 35 SKUs while f.a.e. currently has 55 SKUs in January 2023. In 2021, Thrive partnered with Beyond Meat to release a line of frozen plant-based meals. Thrive expanded into meat, seafood, frozen food, organic and biodynamic wine throughout 2019–2021. In 2024, Thrive Market debuted a retail media network in partnership with Instacart's Carrot ads solution. This allowed brands already running Instacart ads to include Thrive Market's inventory.

== Reception ==
In 2022, the company was voted as the Top-Performing Brand in Sailthru's Retail Personalization Index, along with Sephora, and was also included in Time Magazine's TIME100's Most Influential Companies List in the Disruptor category.

Nick Green was included in TIME100 Next in 2024. In 2024 and 2025, Thrive Market was included in CNBC's Disruptor 50 List. Also in 2025, they were included in Fortune's Change The World list.
