= Connectifier =

American technology company

Connectifier, Inc.
- Company type: Subsidiary
- Industry: Internet, Recruitment
- Founded: California, United States (December 2011)
- Founder: John Jersin; Benjamin McCann
- Headquarters: 1000 W Maude Ave, Sunnyvale, California, United States
- Parent: LinkedIn (2016-present)
- Website: www.connectifier.com

Connectifier was an American company that developed machine learning-based searching and matching technology to help recruiters and hiring managers find talent. The company was acquired by LinkedIn in February 2016 and operated as a wholly owned subsidiary until April 2020. The company had roughly 50 employees at the time of acquisition and drew its bench of AI talent from prestigious institutions including Google, Amazon, Stanford, Microsoft Research, NASA, Caltech, Carnegie Mellon, and Berkeley National Lab.

== History ==
Connectifier was founded in 2011 by John Jersin and Benjamin McCann.

At the time of its acquisition, Connectifier had raised a total of $12 million across three rounds of funding. In 2013, the company participated in Class 4 of Launchpad LA. The company announced it secured Series A financing of $6 million on June 16, 2015. In October of 2015, the company raised an additional $6 million in Series B financing.

By 2015, the company was reported to have grown at a rate of nearly 500% annually reaching a run rate of $10 million in annual recurring revenue 18 months after launch. It was reported later that year that Connectifier had tens of thousands of recruiters as clients and was delivering two to four times as many candidates as LinkedIn. By 2016, Connectifier's customers included over 40% of the Fortune 100.

LinkedIn announced it had entered into a definitive agreement to acquire the company on February 4, 2016.

Connectifier's technology and features were integrated into LinkedIn Recruiter and Microsoft Bing and the product was sunset as a standalone offering on April 30, 2020.
