= Tradesy =

Online resale marketplace for women's fashion

Tradesy Inc.
- Formerly: Recycled Bride
- Type: Private
- Industry: Recommerce
- Founded: 2009 in Los Angeles
- Headquarters: Los Angeles, California, United States
- Area served: United States
- Products: Second-hand Women’s Accessories and Clothing
- Brands: Chanel; Louis Vuitton; Hermes; Gucci; Prada; Cartier
- Website: tradesy.com

Tradesy was an online peer-to-peer resale marketplace for buying and selling women's fashion. The company was headquartered in Santa Monica, California.

== History ==
Tradesy was established in 2009 by Tracy DiNunzio.

The company started in 2009 under the name Recycled Bride, a peer-to-peer resale marketplace to buy and sell wedding dresses and accessories. DiNunzio soon expanded her platform to women's luxury fashion. Tradesy officially launched in 2012.

Tradesy joined the Launchpad LA accelerator in 2011. The company announced Series B funding from Kleiner Perkins Caufield & Byers for $30M in January 2015. In May 2016, Tradesy secured an additional $30M in Series C funding from Wildcat Capital Management.

On November 17, 2015, Tradesy acquired Shop Hers, an international luxury marketplace dedicated to second-hand designer fashion.

In the spring of 2018, Tradesy announced their acquisition of New York-based closet organizing and styling service, Fitz — now rebranded as Tradesy Closet Concierge.

In March 2022, it was announced Tradesy had been acquired by the secondhand luxury marketplace Vestiaire Collective.
