= Meredith Perry =

American entrepreneur

- Born: August 5, 1989 (age 37); Princeton, New Jersey
- Education: University of Pennsylvania
- Occupations: CEO, Elemind Technologies, Inc.
- Known for: Founding uBeam; co-founding Elemind

Meredith Perry (born August 5, 1989) is an American entrepreneur. She founded uBeam, a startup that sought to charge electronic devices wirelessly using ultrasound; the company attracted prominent investors and extensive media coverage, but engineers, outside experts, and former employees questioned whether its technology could be made practical. She is the co-founder and CEO of Elemind, a company developing wearable neurotechnology.

== Career ==
=== Education and research ===
Perry studied paleobiology and astrobiology at the University of Pennsylvania and conducted research with the NASA Ames Research Center and the NASA Astrobiology Institute. She co-authored astrobiology research with Christopher McKay.

=== uBeam ===
In 2011, Perry won the University of Pennsylvania's "PennVention" competition with a proposed ultrasonic wireless charging system, which she named "uBeam". She founded uBeam later that year; early investors included Founders Fund, Andreessen Horowitz, Mark Cuban, and Marissa Mayer. Experts and former uBeam engineers raised doubts about the company's approach, arguing that ultrasound-based charging faced fundamental problems of efficiency and safety and was unlikely to be practical at commercial scale.

Perry argued in a TEDx talk that engineers tend to be linear thinkers and said she had approached the problem differently by consulting public sources and asking basic questions. Perry stepped down as CEO in 2018; coverage at the time reported that the company was shifting toward business-to-business licensing and partnerships.

=== Elemind ===
In October 2019, Perry said on Twitter that she had been working on a new neurotechnology. She co-founded Elemind Technologies in 2020. The company emerged from stealth mode on February 6, 2024, when Perry said its wearable device could suppress tremor in people with essential tremor and help induce sleep, and that it was being explored for memory and pain applications.

Elemind's first commercial product is a neurotechnology headband. The company has pointed to a 2024 randomized controlled trial of alpha phase-locked auditory stimulation for sleep-onset insomnia, published in Scientific Reports by authors including Elemind researchers, and has stated that the device helped 76% of participants with insomnia fall asleep 48% faster on average.

== Recognition and reception ==
Perry and uBeam received extensive media attention in the early 2010s, with Perry frequently profiled as a young technology entrepreneur. Later reporting focused on doubts from engineers, outside experts, and former employees about whether the company's ultrasound-based charging could work as promised.

She was named to Fortune's "40 Under 40" Mobilizers list, Forbes' "30 Under 30" in energy, and Vanity Fair's 2015 "New Establishment" list. In 2014 she was named one of Fast Company's "Most Creative People", and in 2012 she received Elle magazine's Genius Award.
