= Glean Technologies =

American artificial intelligence company

Glean Technologies, Inc.
- Type: Private
- Industry: Artificial Intelligence
- Founded: 2019; 7 years ago
- Founder: Arvind Jain, Piyush Prahladka, Tony Gentilcore, T.R. Vishwanath
- Headquarters: Palo Alto, California
- Number of employees: 1,000
- Website: glean.com

Glean Technologies, Inc. is an American technology company specializing in enterprise-grade artificial intelligence (AI) and search capabilities.

As of 2025, it had a valuation of $7.2 billion.

== History ==
The company was founded in 2019 in Palo Alto, California.

In September 2021, Glean introduced its assistive search tool, designed to pull together information from dozens of disparate applications, streamlining access to critical data across various platforms, to the market.

In February 2025, the company reported reaching $100 million in annual recurring revenue.

Glean reported reaching $200 million in annual recurring revenue in December 2025, doubling its ARR in nine months.

At that time, the company also announced its agent platform, designed to automate workplace tasks beyond search. The platform became generally available in May 2025.

In September 2025, Glean introduced a third-generation Glean Assistant and an Enterprise Graph focused on personalization and multi-step task execution.

It was named CNBC's top 50 disruptor in 2025.

Glean announced its plans in April 2026 to open an office in Nashville, Tennessee, for its corporate sales division. The office was expected to employ 65 people initially, with the company planning to add 35 additional positions by the end of the year.

By 2026, Glean shifted its focus from enterprise search toward connecting AI models with enterprise systems and data.

== Funding rounds ==
In March 2019, shortly after its establishment, Glean raised $15 million in Series A funding co-led by Kleiner Perkins and Lightspeed, which included participation from the Slack Fund. In March 2021, the company closed a Series B funding round of $40M led by General Catalyst.

In May 2022, the company secured a $100M Series C led by Sequoia Capital at a $1B valuation and hit the Unicorn status. In February 2024, Glean raised over $200 million in Series D funding at a $2.2B valuation.

In September 2024, Glean raised over $260 million in Series E funding, co-led by Altimeter Capital and DST Global, taking its valuation to $4.6 billion.

In June 2025, Glean raised $150 million in Series F financing led by Wellington Management at a $7.2 billion valuation.
