= Drawbridge (company) =

Drawbridge, Inc.
- Company type: Subsidiary
- Headquarters: San Mateo, California, {{{location_country}}}
- Area served: Global
- Founder: Kamakshi Sivaramakrishnan
- Key people: Kamakshi Sivaramakrishnan (CEO); Devin Guan (CTO); Dave Zinman (COO); Matt Gallatin (CFO); Jodi Garg (CPO)
- Industry: Marketing Technology
- Parent: LinkedIn (2019-present)
- Website: drawbridge.com
- Launched: 2011

Drawbridge is a people-based identity management company operating out of San Mateo, California, USA. It has been a subsidiary of LinkedIn since 2019. Drawbridge has built a people-based identity graph and cross-device advertising platform that specializes in using machine learning to match individuals across connected devices, including desktops, smartphones, tablets, and connected TVs, in order to serve more relevant ads across devices.

The company received a patent for its "system to group internet devices based upon device usage" in 2016 and a patent for "system and method for determining related digital identities" in 2019.

== History ==
Kamakshi Sivaramakrishnan, a former AdMob scientist, built the technology that allowed her to pair users to devices in late 2010 and formed Adsymptotic, which is now known as Drawbridge. In 2014, the company announced support for video ads and updated its analytics suite to give marketers insights on multi-touch attribution and information on their audiences across devices.

In 2016, the company was ranked #54 on the Deloitte Fast 500 North America list and was listed on the Inc. 5000 List of Fastest Growing Companies in America for the second consecutive year.

In 2017, the company was ranked #24 on the CNBC Disruptor 50 list, and named one of Fortune’s "50 Companies Leading the AI Revolution." It was also reported that 32% of technical roles and 43% of leadership roles (director or higher) at Drawbridge were filled by women.

In 2018, Drawbridge sold its media business to Gimbal and was again named a CNBC Disruptor.

In 2019, Drawbridge was acquired by LinkedIn

== Technology ==
At a high level, Drawbridge probabilistically determines whether two devices are used by the same person by analyzing various events occurring on the devices and the attributes that those events yield.

In other words, Drawbridge observes a user's activities, primarily through the proxy of ads served to various devices (mobile device or desktop web), which gives them an ID. Since IDs are different across all the devices a user may interact with, Drawbridge then computes a confidence-score based on the likelihood that IDs from different sources belong to the same person or identity.

== Reception ==
Most mainstream media outlets have been fairly receptive to Drawbridge's pairing technology. Predictably, technology focused media outlets have been borderline laudatory in their coverage while some blogs have voiced concerns that the technology is invasive and could lead to breaches of privacy.

== Financials ==
Drawbridge has received funding from Sequoia Capital, Kleiner Perkins, Northgate Capital, and Mitsui & Co.

In 2016 the company announced the close of its $25M Series C round of financing, led by Sequoia Capital.

In 2018 the company announced an additional $15M raised from all of its existing VC investors, bringing its total capital raised to $70M.
