= Launchpad LA =

American startup accelerator

- Industry: Startup accelerator
- Founded: 2009; 17 years ago
- Founders: Mark Suster, Adam Lilling
- Defunct: 2014
- Headquarters: Santa Monica, California, United States
- Key people: Sam Teller; Mark Suster; Adam Lilling; Jamie Kantrowitz
- Products: Venture capital, investments
- Website: launchpad.la

Launchpad LA was a startup accelerator program located in Los Angeles, California. Founded in 2009 by venture capitalists Mark Suster and Adam Lilling.

== History ==
=== Inception and Early Years (2009-2011) ===
The program aimed to select ten startup companies to participate, offering them a unique opportunity to receive mentorship, guidance, and resources. Applicants were required to physically relocate to Los Angeles for the six-month program, reflecting Launchpad LA's commitment to creating a thriving local startup ecosystem.

The inspiration for Launchpad LA came from a story shared by Matt Coffin, the founder of LowerMyBills, who had faced adversity during the dot-com crash but found success with the help of an experienced entrepreneur's guidance. Suster then approached Lilling about joining the initiative.

During its early years, Launchpad LA operated as a networking group without an official office space or equity requirements. Instead, it focused on organizing regular events and dinners to support the participating companies. By 2011, Launchpad LA had accepted 23 companies into its mentorship program, with an impressive 19 of them receiving outside funding, and nine being acquired. These companies collectively raised approximately $80 million in funding, with exits exceeding $60 million.

=== Evolution into an Accelerator (2011-2014) ===
The year 2011 marked a significant shift for Launchpad LA as it transformed into a full-fledged accelerator program. Each participating company in the third class received $50,000 in funding. The investment was made possible through contributions from various venture capital firms and individual investors, including Rincon Ventures, Idealab, Baroda Ventures, Upfront Ventures, and others. Launchpad LA also provided free office space in Santa Monica, conveniently located near the Third Street Promenade. This amount grew to $100,000 in 2013.

Local venture capitalists participated, spending at least one day per week at the facility, actively engaging with the accepted companies. The program benefited from a group of critically-acclaimed VC and individual advisors, including Jason Calacanis, Howard Lindzon, and Eric Ries.

Sam Teller, a well-regarded figure in the Los Angeles startup community, took the reins to lead Launchpad LA during its third class. His experience included co-founding Charlie, a Los Angeles-based media company, and working on high-profile projects for notable figures and organizations. Jamie Kantrowitz, a former MySpace executive, would later join as a partner.

Launchpad LA's impact on the Southern California startup landscape continued to grow, and it consistently ranked as one of the top accelerator programs in the United States. The program received over 1,000 applicants per class.

=== Closure (2014) ===
The program wound down in 2014 as Sam Teller became Elon Musk's Chief of Staff.

== Notable Companies and Alumni ==
Launchpad LA has provided support and mentorship to numerous promising startups over the years. Some notable companies that have participated in the program include:

- Connectifier: A recruiting software company acquired by LinkedIn for $150m.
- Prevoty: An application security company acquired by Imperva for $140 million.
- Pathmatics: An advertising intelligence company acquired by Sensor Tower.
- Recycled Media (d.b.a Tradesy): A popular online marketplace for buying and selling fashion and luxury items, which raised over $200m and was acquired by Vestiaire Collective.
- ChowNow: An online food ordering platform, which raised over $60m.
- Tuition.io: A company offering employer contributions to student loans as an employee benefit.
- Panna: A cooking app for iPads featuring recipes and videos from famous chefs.
- Milk & Honey: An online shoe company started by two sisters, which gained recognition for its unique approach to fashion.
- Atlas Powered: A company offering solutions for the restaurant industry, enhancing efficiency and customer experience.
- Thrive Market - Nick Green was an EIR at Launchpad LA while working on the idea for Thrive Market.
