= IFund =

US$200 million capital fund

The iFund is a US$200 million capital fund. Developers may enter into equity deals for the creation of applications, services, and components for Apple's iPhone, iPod Touch and iPad platform. It is being offered and managed by venture capital company Kleiner, Perkins, Caufield & Byers (KPCB).

The iFund was announced by KPCB partner John Doerr at the same time as the iPhone OS SDK, at Apple's iPhone Roadmap event on March 6, 2008, in Cupertino, California. The iFund is managed by KPCB partner Matt Murphy in collaboration with partners Chi-Hua Chien, John Doerr, Bill Joy, Randy Komisar, Ellen Pao, and Ted Schlein. Apple provides KPCB with market insight and support. On March 31, 2010, KPCB announced the fund has been doubled.

On September 15, 2008, KPCB launched a blog to share perspectives on the iFund.

In December 2008 the confidential iFund application data was accidentally published on the web by Kleiner Perkins Caufield & Byers’ former hosting provider, Meteora Technologies Group, in a database dump file. The file was indexed by Google and coincidentally discovered by a fruux staffer. The file contained Applications from 588 companies including detailed information from each of these companies, like founder bios, financial ratios and business models.

== Portfolio companies ==
- Path (social network)
- shopkick (acquired)
- Ngmoco (acquired)
- SessionM (acquired)
- Drawbridge (acquired)
- Shazam (acquired)
- Booyah
- Crittercism
