= Tuition.io =

American technology company

Tuition.io, Inc.
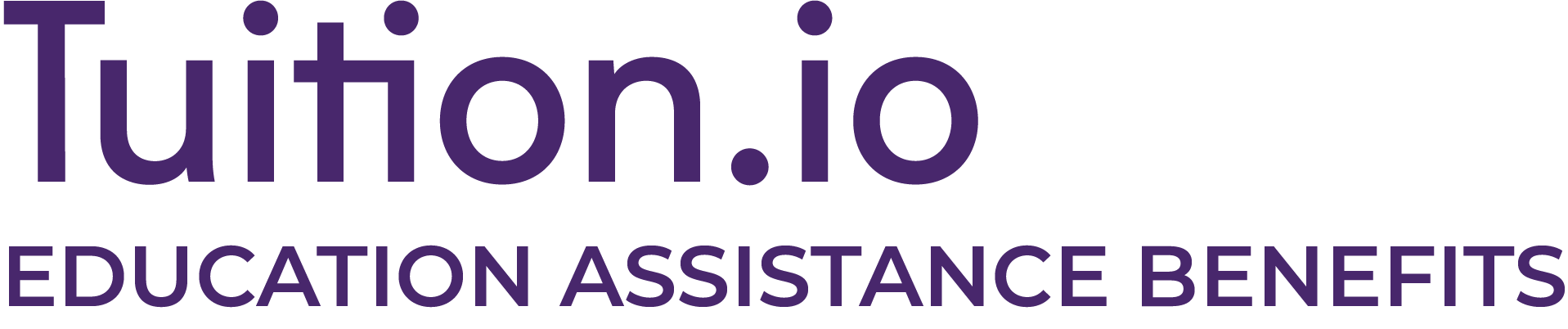
- Type: Private
- Headquarters: Santa Monica, California
- Key people: Brendon McQueen (founder), Steve Pomerantz (co-founder), Scott Thompson (CEO), Scott Simmons (CFO, COO)

Tuition.io, Inc. is an American private technology company headquartered in Santa Monica, California, that provides employer-sponsored education assistance benefits. Its modular platform enables companies to offer services including student loan repayment assistance, tuition reimbursement administration, public service loan forgiveness guidance, Secure 2.0 retirement matching, and coaching to support employee financial wellness.

== History ==
Tuition.io was founded in 2012 by Brendon McQueen and Steve Pomerantz, launching publicly in 2013 after completing the Launchpad LA accelerator. Initially a direct-to-consumer platform for managing student loans, it pivoted to employer-centered solutions to provide scalable education benefits.

Scott Thompson became CEO in 2016, and Scott Simmons joined as CFO/COO in 2017.

In July 2023, Tuition.io acquired Wiley's Tuition Manager business, expanding its tuition assistance offering and adding more corporate clients. In April 2025, the company secured additional debt financing from ORIX USA's Growth Capital unit, following a previous $15.2 million in equity funding.

== Products and services ==
Tuition.io offers an integrated suite of education-focused employee benefits:

- Student Loan Management & Wellness: tools for repayment tracking, consolidation strategies, and public service loan forgiveness guidance eligibility monitoring.
- Tuition Assistance Administration: automation of employer tuition reimbursement programs.
- Public Service Loan Forgiveness Tools: form completion support and eligibility tracking for public service workers.
- Secure 2.0 Retirement Match: employer retirement contributions linked to employee student loan payments.
- One-on-One Coaching: personalized guidance to help employees manage repayment and financial decisions.

== Market and clients ==
Tuition.io serves more than 350 organizations across healthcare, education, government, retail, and other sectors. Notable clients have included Fidelity Investments, Children's Hospital & Medical Center, Ford Motor Company, Universal Music Group, Starbucks and UMass Memorial Health.

== Funding ==
The company raised $8.2 million in Series A funding in 2015, led by MassMutual Ventures and Wildcat Venture Partners. A 2023 acquisition of Wiley's Tuition Manager and 2025 debt financing from ORIX USA expanded the company's reach and product capabilities.
