= SonicEnergy =

U.S. company developing a wireless charging system

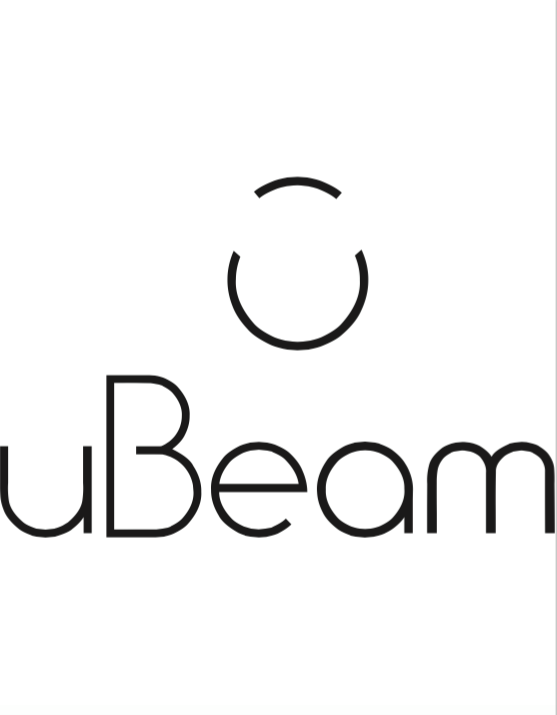
- Logo used from 2014 to 2018
- Native name: uBeam
- Formerly: uBeam
- Type: Privately held company
- Industry: Technology
- Founded: 2012 in New York, New York United States
- Founder: Meredith Perry
- Defunct: February 5, 2024
- Headquarters: Marina del Rey, California, USA
- Key people: Meredith Perry; Matthew O'Donnell; Martine Rothblatt; Chuck Davis; Ken Hertz; Mark Suster
- Products: Wireless power; Ultrasonic transceivers; Ultrasonic sensors
- Services: Wireless power

SonicEnergy (previously uBeam) was a US company that claimed to be developing a wireless charging system that works via ultrasound. Whether this is even physically possible was widely questioned, including by former uBeam staff.

== History ==
SonicEnergy (previously uBeam) was founded in 2011 by Meredith Perry and won the University of Pennsylvania's invention competition, PennVention, in April 2011. It demonstrated its first prototype of the technology at The Wall Street Journal's All Things Digital Conference, D9, in May 2011.

uBeam received $26 million in investment from venture capitalists and investors including Andreessen Horowitz, Upfront Ventures, Founders Fund, Mark Cuban and Marissa Mayer.

By 2016, all of uBeam's original engineering team had left the company, with some engineers leaving before their stocks had vested.

Axios reported that uBeam privately demonstrated a working prototype of the technology at the Upfront Summit on February 2, 2017. uBeam demonstrated wireless charging of several phones using an improved prototype such as the iPhone 7 and the Samsung Galaxy S7 phones simultaneously to USA Today.

In September 2018, Meredith Perry stepped down from her role as CEO. She was replaced by Jacqueline McCauley as acting CEO. In December 2018, McCauley was replaced by Simon McElrea as CEO who restructured the company under the name SonicEnergy; Subsequent to this, McElrea stepped down as CEO in December 2019, and was replaced by Will Kain, formerly the company's CFO, as acting CEO. Will Kain stepped down as CEO in May 2021.

SonicEnergy has been reported to have gone out of business in February 2024

== Technology ==
In November 2015, uBeam released technical specifications for its proposed system. uBeam's system would transmit ultrasound at frequencies between 45 kHz and 75 kHz, with a sound intensity of 145 dB to 155 dB SPL, and it would use a phased array technique to direct the beam.

== Controversies ==
uBeam's claims were widely considered unlikely to be achievable. Critics have cited problems such as the difficulty of achieving high efficiency in sound transfer, achieving an unobstructed path for the beam, and the high absorption of high frequency ultrasound in air.

Australian electrical engineer and blogger Dave Jones has been a frequent critic of uBeam, stating it "will never be a practical solution", and has offered detailed explanations on why "it will never work".

In 2016, former uBeam engineering VP Paul Reynolds wrote a series of blog posts stating that uBeam’s technology did not work, saying that "While in theory [uBeam] may be possible in limited cases, the safety, efficiency, and economics of it mean it is not even remotely practical." According to some former uBeam engineers, the technology would at best be able to supply a "trickle charge" to a cell phone, transmitting a few watts of power over one or two meters.

=== Ultrasound safety ===
Ultrasound energy has the potential to produce biological effects on the body, such as heating the tissues slightly. In some cases, it can also produce small pockets of gas in body fluids or tissues (cavitation). OSHA, citing a 2001 UK report, noted that hearing risk from exposure to very high frequency noise remained unquantified.

uBeam claimed that the beam will cut out automatically if it is intercepted by objects other than the receiver.
