= Apteligent =

Software platform

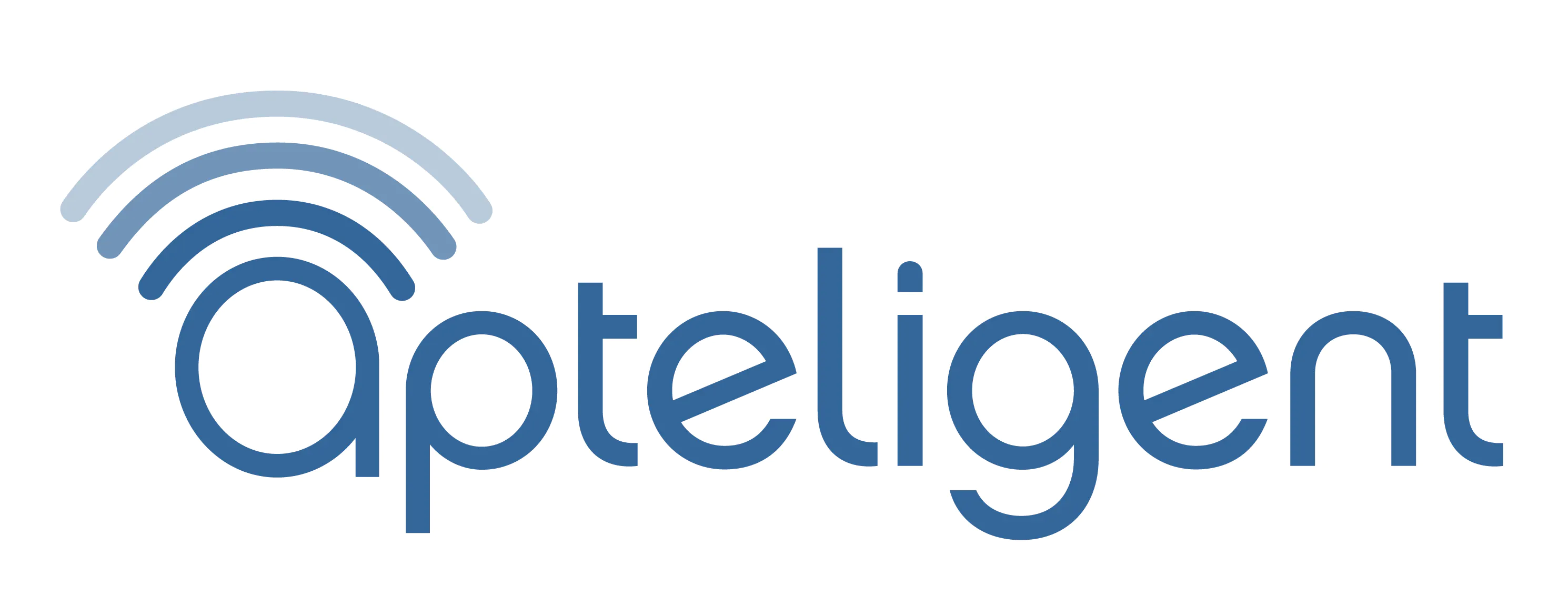
- Type: Technology
- Industry: Mobile application development
- Founded: 2010; 16 years ago
- Founder: Andrew Levy, Robert Kwok and Jeeyun Kim
- Headquarters: San Francisco, California, USA
- Services: Mobile performance application monitoring and crash reporting for multiple platforms.
- Website: www.apteligent.com

Apteligent, formerly recognized as Crittercism Inc., is a software platform headquartered in San Francisco, California. This platform is utilized by mobile developers, product managers, and individuals interested in mobile ecosystem performance data. Apteligent offers a range of tools and insights designed to enhance the performance of mobile applications.

Apteligent's capabilities extend to providing real-time, worldwide monitoring of application diagnostics and failures across various platforms, including iOS, Android, Hybrid, and Unity apps. It plays a role in facilitating the analysis and improvement of mobile app performance. Apteligent is widely adopted, with over 9 billion monthly app launches and integration into 23 million apps, including the popular title, Pokémon Go.

== Mobile Ecosystem Data Reports ==
In 2016, Apteligent launched a directory for Android and iOS devices by geography, as well as monthly reports focused on various aspects of iOS and Android version adoption, performance, and stability. In addition, in April 2016, Apteligent partnered with STL Partners, a London-based telecommunications industry analyst firm, to deliver a quarterly report focused on global network carrier performance and its potential impact on user experience.

== Acquisition ==
On May 15, 2017, VMware announced its acquisition of Apteligent. The product remains available, and VMware recently announced an additional product, Workspace ONE Intelligence, that builds on the acquisition.
