= Remind =

Company

- Available in: 86 languages
- List of languages: Afrikaans; Albanian; Arabic; Armenian; Azerbaijani; Basque; Belarusian; Bengali; Bosnian; Bulgarian; Catalan; Chichewa; Chinese; Croatian; Czech; Danish; Dutch; English; Esperanto; Estonian; Filipino; Finnish; French; Galician; Georgian; German; Greek; Gujarati; Haitian Creole; Hausa; Hebrew; Hindi; Hungarian; Icelandic; Indonesian; Irish; Italian; Japanese; Javanese; Kannada; Kazakh; Khmer; Korean; Lao; Latin; Latvian; Lithuanian; Macedonian; Malagasy; Malay; Malayalam; Maltese; Marathi; Mongolian; Māori; Nepali; Norwegian; Persian; Polish; Portuguese; Punjabi; Romanian; Russian; Samoan; Serbian; Sinhala; Slovak; Slovenian; Somali; Spanish; Sundanese; Swahili; Swedish; Tajik; Tamil; Telugu; Thai; Turkish; Ukrainian; Urdu; Uzbek; Vietnamese; Welsh; Yiddish; Yoruba; Zulu
- Parent: ParentSquare
- Website: remind.com
- Current status: Active
- Native clients on: iOS, Android, and Web

Remind (previously Remind101) is a private mobile messaging platform used for communication between teachers, parents, and students in K–12 schools.

As of September 2016, the platform was used in more than 50% of the public schools in the U.S.

== History ==
=== Founders ===
Remind101 was founded in 2011 by brothers Brett and David Kopf. The platform was based on a prototype messaging system developed by David to help Brett, who was diagnosed with attention deficit disorder and dyslexia, to keep track of tests while attending Michigan State University. The two decided to found a company based on the messaging platform, and it became part of the first class at the Imagine K12 incubator in Palo Alto, California.

=== Funding ===
In 2014, the company added John Doerr, a venture capitalist at Kleiner Perkins, to its board. As of 2014, the company had raised $59 million in funding, and had over 20 million monthly active users across the United States. On June 16, 2014, the company renamed Remind101 to Remind.

=== Leadership ===
In 2016, Brian Grey, former CEO of Bleacher Report, became CEO of Remind.

=== Acquisition ===
Remind was purchased by ParentSquare in November 2023. Both companies' platforms and executive staff were merged. Existing Remind products kept their names.
