= Padmasree Warrior =

(India born) American chemical engineer and business executive

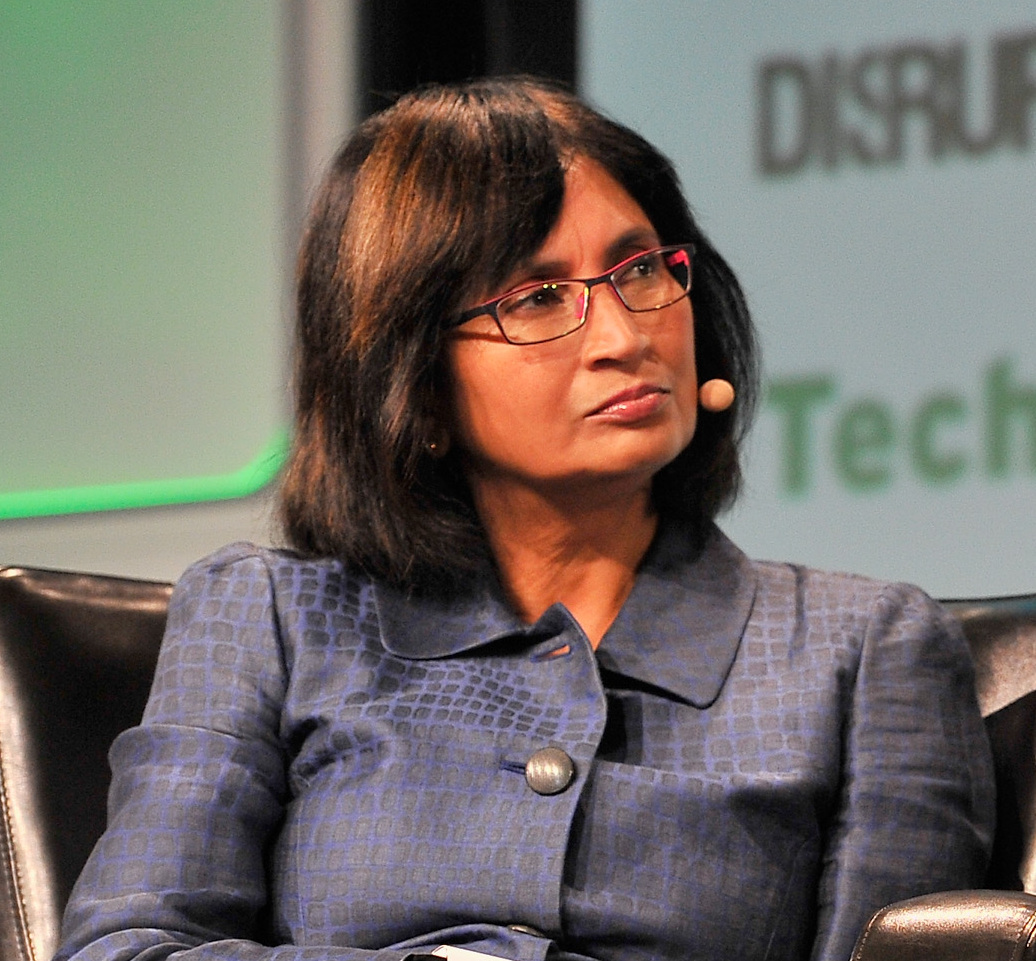
- Warrior in September 2016
- Born: Yellepeddi Padmasree; Vijayawada, Andhra Pradesh, India
- Education: IIT Delhi (B.Tech); Cornell University (MS)
- Spouse: Mohandas Warrior
- Children: 1

Padmasree Warrior (born Yellepeddi Padmasree) is an Indian-American businesswoman and technology executive. She is known for her leadership roles in technology firms like Cisco where she was the CTO for seven years, and at Motorola where she was the CTO for five years. She also was the CEO of Nio USA, an electric car maker. Currently, she is the founder and CEO of Fable, a curated reading platform focused on mental wellness. She is on the board of directors of Microsoft and Spotify.

In 2014, she was listed as one of the 100 most powerful woman in the world by Forbes. In 2018 she was also featured among "America's Top 50 Women In Tech" by Forbes.

== Early life ==
Yellepeddi Padmasree was born into a Telugu family in Vijayawada,Andhra Pradesh, India. She went to school at the Children's Montessori School and Maris Stella College in Vijayawada. Warrior received a bachelor's degree in chemical engineering from IIT Delhi in 1982. She holds a master's degree in chemical engineering from Cornell University.

== Career ==
=== Motorola ===
Warrior joined Motorola in 1984 Over the course of her 23 years at the company she was Corporate Vice-president and general manager of Motorola's Energy Systems Group, and Corporate Vice-president and Chief Technology Officer in its Semiconductor Products Sector. Immediately prior to becoming Motorola's CTO, she was general manager of Thoughtbeam, a product of Motorola, in Tempe, Arizona. When named Motorola's CTO in January 2003, Warrior became a senior vice-president and in 2005 she was promoted to executive vice-president.

During Warrior's tenure as CTO, Motorola was awarded the 2004 National Medal of Technology by the President of the United States, the first time the company had received this honour. During this period she was a proponent of "Seamless Mobility" – the concept of having seamless communication across all facets of a person's life. The dream was not fully realised and the concept was eventually dropped from Motorola marketing presentations.

=== Cisco ===
On 4 December 2007, she left Motorola to become CTO at Cisco Systems. She left Cisco in June 2015.

=== NIO ===
She joined the Chinese electric car company, NIO Inc, in December 2015 as a board member and as CEO and chief development officer for NIO U.S. She resigned from NIO in December 2018.

=== Fable ===
In September 2019, Warrior founded a new startup, Fable, and is its president and CEO. In January 2021, Fable launched its app, a subscription-based book recommendation engine and private social network. Warrior has said they're working to improve cognitive fitness.

== Recognition ==
Fortune Magazine called her one of four rising stars on its Most Powerful Women list, placing her between the 10 "highest paid" and the "Young and Powerful" categories. In 2005, The Economic Times ranked Warrior as the 11th Most Influential Global Indian. In 2001 she was one of six women nationwide selected to receive the "Women Elevating Science and Technology" award from Working Woman Magazine. As of 2014, she is listed as the 71st most powerful woman in the world by Forbes. In 2018 she was also featured among "America's Top 50 Women In Tech" by Forbes.

Warrior is featured in the Notable Women in Computing cards.

== Board participation ==
Warrior has been a member of Microsoft's board of directors since December 2015. She is also a board member at Spotify. She was a member of the Gap Inc. board from 2013 to 2016 and the Box board from 2014 to 2016.

Warrior is on the boards of Thorn, the Joffrey Ballet, Chicago's Museum of Science and Industry, Chicago Mayor's Technology Council, and advisory council of Indian Institute of Technology. She was on the Cornell University board, the Texas Governor's Council for Digital Economy, the Technology Advisory Council for the FCC, and the Advisory Committee for Computing and Information Science and Engineering of the National Science Foundation (NSF). She is a mentor in the State Department's International Women Leaders Mentoring Partnership. Warrior was on the board of directors for Corning Incorporated from 2005 through 2008.

== Personal life ==
Warrior is married to Mohandas Warrior and has a son.
