= DreamBox Learning =

American online software provider

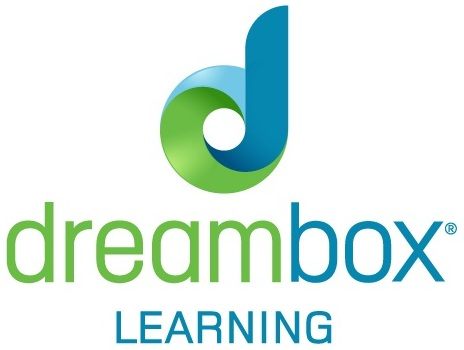
- Type: Privately Held
- Industry: Software
- Founded: 2006; 20 years ago
- Founders: Lou Gray; Ben Slivka
- Headquarters: Bellevue, Washington, United States
- Key people: Jessie Woolley-Wilson, president and chief executive officer
- Products: Mathematics and Reading Adaptive Learning Technology
- Owner: Discovery Education; (2023–present)
- Website: Dreambox Learning

DreamBox Learning is an American online software provider that focuses on mathematics education for elementary and middle school, and reading education for elementary through high school level. The mathematics software provides pre-kindergarten through 8th-grade students with mathematics lessons and activities, while the reading software provides students in elementary to high school levels with articles to improve their reading skills.

== Overview ==
=== DreamBox Learning Math ===
DreamBox Learning Math teaches mathematical subjects at the grade K-8 level through interactive and practice activities. It has a gamified interface through which students earn coins for completed lessons. These coins can be spent to customize in-app avatars, wallpapers and music.

=== DreamBox Learning Reading ===
DreamBox Learning Reading teaches reading skills at the grade 3-12 level. The program utilizes an algorithm that assesses student reading level and recommends lessons based on the students' ability. In 2023, DreamBox released Reading Park, a reading assessment and learning program for K-2 students.

== History ==
In 2006, DreamBox Learning was founded in Bellevue, Washington by the CEO and entrepreneur Lou Gray, and former Microsoft employee Ben Slivka. In 2010, DreamBox Learning was acquired by the Charter School Growth Fund. The acquisition was sponsored by Netflix CEO Reed Hastings through a program-related investment. Jessie Woolley-Wilson became president and CEO of DreamBox Learning shortly after the acquisition.

The software was designed for students outside the classroom to augment their mathematics education and school districts seeking to enhance their mathematics curriculum. In 2012, the firm offered free trial licensing of lessons aligned with the Common Core State Standards Initiative to all schools within the United States. The company released a free iOS app, DreamBox Math Learning program, in 2013.

In 2014, the firm launched its Adaptive Math Curriculum for students in grades six through eight, with topics including basic functions, geometry, single-variable algebra, and ratios. The same year, DreamBox Learning partnered with the education startup Clever Also in 2014, the International Society for Technology Education reported that DreamBox added the Spanish language support to its adaptive math software for students in grades K-8. In 2016, the company updated its K-8 math curriculum with the ability to create custom assignments for individual students.

As of 2021, the company had raised $150 million in funding. In 2023, the company was acquired by Discovery Education, a Charlotte-based education technology company backed by Clearlake Capital.
