= Michele Guel =

American cybersecurity engineer

Michele Guel is an American cybersecurity engineer.

Guel has a B.A in Mathematics with a minor in Cybernetic Systems and has also completed a two-year program in Biblical Studies, receiving an Associate of Arts degree. She has a M.S in Software Engineering with a concentration in cybersecurity.

In her early days of cybersecurity, the Morris Worm attack had occurred in 1988 and Guel was a part of the incident response, while serving as an intern at the NASA Ames Research Center. After eleven years at NASA Ames in multiple roles, she then moved on to work at Cisco, joining on as a founding member of its internal security team. She served multiple roles at Cisco, including co-founding their Women in Cybersecurity program, as she is a frequent speaker on gender diversity and acknowledged the gender gap in the field of cybersecurity. While at Cisco, she co-authored Security Principles for the Enterprise Architecture Practice.

She also worked for the SANS Institute, where she worked on starting up a program called CyberStart America and later became the President of the National Cyber Scholarship Foundation. This program’s goal fell into place with Guel’s goal to enable more people to enter the cybersecurity field and the NCSF helped fund this program.

Additionally, Guel is listed as a co-inventor on the patent for “Techniques for voice-based user authentication for mobile access to network devices.”

For her work, she is a National Cyber Security Award Winner. She holds many licenses and certifications within the field of cybersecurity and has been recognized by the SANS Institute as a “Person who made a difference” in the field of cybersecurity.

== Contributions ==
Following her work at multiple companies, mostly surrounding the field of cybersecurity, Michele Guel has contributed plenty to grow the field, which was her goal in the first place. During her time at the NASA Ames Research Center, the Morris Worm attack had occurred, on November 2, 1988. Being a part of the effort to restore the internet after this cyberattack was what caused Guel to realize she was heavily interested in cybersecurity and wanted to do more work in said field. This led to her helping create and lead the information security program at the research center’s NAS Facility in 1989, a year after the Morris Worm attack. This is where she met cybersecurity specialist Alan Paller, who recently died. He worked with Guel to found the SANS Institute. Michele Guel played a key role in the creation of the SANS Network Security Conference in 1994, serving as the General Conference Chair for seven years. She did not forget about the SANS Institute, as she worked with Alan Paller in 2018 to run a girls-only program called Girls Go CyberStart, to expose females to the field of cybersecurity, as data had previously shown that there is a major gap in the field between men and women. This program was quite successful, which prompted the pair to start up the CyberStart America program. They recognized that the field of cybersecurity overall is still not well known enough throughout the country, so this program was created to show all demographics, starting with the younger generations, that cybersecurity is something they can study if they choose and CyberStart America contains the resources to bring them deeper into the field and the work it carries.This program will unfortunately end soon, as of 2024.

== Research, publications, patents, and scholarships ==
Guel has been a part of multiple cybersecurity-related publications, starting with the SANS Security Digest, which ran from 1998 to 2001. She founded the Digest and continued on as an editor until it ended. She also was the author of the SANS Network Security Roadmap Poster, which was first run in 1995. And lastly, during her time at the SANS Institute, she ran a tutorial for security and policies in 2001. Following that, she wrote a report in 2002 on information security, titled “A Framework for Choosing Your Next Generation Authentication/Authorization System.”

Additionally, she has served as a co-author or mentor for two publications, both with author Brooke Schoenfield. The first was the book “Security Principles for the Enterprise Architecture Practice” and the second was the book “Secrets of a Cybersecurity Architect”.

She has one patent, US Patent No. 7,158,776 from January 2007. This patent was created by a group of five people and contains ways to verify someone’s identity using their voice, when accessing a network remotely.

She has also spoken at multiple conferences surrounding cybersecurity. She first spoke at the Women of Impact Conference at Cisco during her time there, on March 20, 2018. The main points of her speech at this conference were to emphasize that all generations of women, starting with the younger ones, should have easily-accessible resources in the field of cybersecurity, whilst also realizing that our differences in any regard should not be a threat to quality of work and everyone should coexist together, for work to get done. She also gave a total of five presentations at the RSA Conference, which is a conference all about security. She gave one presentation in 2017, three in 2019, and one in 2020.

== Awards, honors, and recognition ==
Guel has received multiple licenses and certificates. The first would be in June 1991, when she received a Certificate in Supervision and Management from San Jose State University, where she previously received two degrees from there. Next, she received an CISSP from ISC2 in August 1999, which is a certificate in information technology. Following that, in November 2010, Guel received her GIAC Security Essentials certificate from the SANS Institute. In 2010, Michele Guel was promoted to Distinguished Engineer at Cisco, becoming one of the few women to hold this title within the company.

Guel has received multiple honors due to her exhaustive work in the field of cybersecurity. Alongside all of the certifications she has received, she has also received 4 awards. She is a National Cyber Security Award Winner. In 2014, She was recognized by the SANS Institute as a “Person who made a difference” in the field of cybersecurity, for her work at Cisco, specifically in creating their Security Knowledge Empowerment, or SKE, program, which has proven to be significantly helpful to the company’s endeavors. In 2015, Guel received the ABIE Women of Vision Award for Leadership, provided by the Anita Borg Institute. In 2016, Guel received the prestigious Anita Borg Institute's Women of Vision Technology Leadership Award, recognizing her significant contributions to the field of cybersecurity.

Guel was appointed President of the National Cyber Scholarship Foundation, which was begun by Alan Paller and was behind the funding of CyberStart America.
