= Kamakshi Sivaramakrishnan =

- Education: Stanford University (PhD)
- Occupation: Entrepreneur

Kamakshi Sivaramakrishnan is an entrepreneur who founded the advertising-technology company Drawbridge in 2010. She served on LiveRamp's board of directors from November 2020 until January 2023.

== Life ==
Sivaramakrishnan grew up in Bombay. She worked for AdMob.

She holds a PhD from Stanford University. LinkedIn acquired Drawbridge in 2019. In 2022, Sivaramakrishnan and Abhishek Bhowmick co-founded Samooha, which was acquired by Snowflake in 2023.

== Recognition ==
Sivaramakrishnan was included in Forbes' 2018 list of America's Top 50 Women in Tech.
