= IEEE Transactions on Image Processing =

- Subject: Image processing
- Language: English
- Edited by: Benoît Macq

Publication details
- History: 1992–present
- Publisher: IEEE Signal Processing Society
- Frequency: Monthly
- Impact factor: 13.7 (2024)

Standard abbreviations
- ISO 4: IEEE Trans. Image Process.

Indexing
- CODEN: IIPRE4
- ISSN: 1057-7149 (print); 1941-0042 (web)
- LCCN: 92640141
- OCLC no.: 682975242

Links
- Journal homepage; Online access

The IEEE Transactions on Image Processing is a monthly peer-reviewed scientific journal covering aspects of image processing in the field of signal processing. It was established in 1992 and is published by the IEEE Signal Processing Society. The editor-in-chief is Benoît Macq (Université catholique de Louvain). According to the Journal Citation Reports, the journal has a 2024 impact factor of 13.7.
