= Ainura Sagyn =

Kyrgyzstani computer engineer, ecofeminist and entrepreneur

- Айнура Сагын
- Born: 1989 (age 36–37); Talas

Ainura Sagyn (Kyrgyz: Айнура Сагын; born 1989) is a Kyrgyzstani computer engineer, ecofeminist and entrepreneur. She has been profiled by UN Women and chosen as one of the BBC's 100 inspirational women in 2022.

== Life ==
Sagyn was born in Talas in 1989. She went to take food technology at the Kyrgyz-Turkish Manas University and learnt Turkish, but she realised at the end of the first year that she wanted to study software engineering. She was trained in Moscow at the British Higher School of Design.

In autumn 2022 she was included in the 100 women that the BBC consider most influential that year. The BBC broadcast in several languages and they ask their different language services to choose someone who has been influential that year. Sagyn had been chosen earlier in 2022 by UN Women. They had profiled her and four other women for the lead they were showing in mitigating the effect of climate change. She had founded a company called Tazar which means going greener. The product was a mobile application which unites people with waste products with the people who can recycle them. She has a business partner named Aimeerim Tursalieva. Another app is called Tazar Bazaar which allows women users to sell their products.

In April 2024 she was one of the members of a team called Kadam that arranged for the creation of four pieces of streetart made out of bottle tops. The subject of the art are all unknown heroes. One is a street vendor, another a press secretary, another a film projectionist and the last is the transformative architect Ulan Zhaparov. Sagyn worked with the journalist Rakhat Asangulova and the artist Dimitri Petrovsky.
