= Kleiner Perkins =

American venture capital firm

Coordinates: 37.421731°N 122.211275°W

Kleiner Perkins Caufield & Byers, LLC
- Trade name: Kleiner Perkins
- Type: Private
- Industry: Venture capital
- Founded: 1972; 54 years ago in California
- Founders: Eugene Kleiner; Thomas Perkins; Frank J. Caufield; Brook Byers
- Headquarters: Menlo Park, California, U.S.
- Products: Investments
- AUM: US$21 billion (2026)
- Website: www.kleinerperkins.com

Kleiner Perkins Caufield & Byers, LLC, commonly known as Kleiner Perkins or KP, is an American venture capital firm which specializes in investing in early stage and growth companies. Since its founding in 1972, the firm has supported America Online, Amazon.com, Tandem Computers, Compaq, Electronic Arts, JD.com, Square, Genentech, Google, Netscape, Sun Microsystems, Nest, Palo Alto Networks, Synack, Snap, AppDynamics, Twitter, Applied Intuition, Anthropic, Waymo, Glean Technologies, OpenEvidence, Rippling, Harvey & Together AI. By 2024, it had raised 21 venture capital funds and six growth funds. In 2026, the firm announce its twenty-second venture fund, KP22, a $1 billion fund to back early-stage companies, and $2.5 billion in growth funds to back businesses.

Kleiner Perkins is headquartered in Menlo Park in Silicon Valley, with offices in San Francisco and Shanghai, China.

== History ==
The firm was formed in 1972 as Kleiner Perkins. When Caufield and Byers became partners as well, the name was changed to Kleiner, Perkins, Caufield & Byers (KPCB) in Menlo Park, California, with a focus on seed, early-stage, and growth companies. The firm is named after its four founding partners: Eugene Kleiner, Tom Perkins, Frank J. Caufield, and Brook Byers. Kleiner was a founder of Fairchild Semiconductor, and Perkins was an early Hewlett-Packard executive. Byers joined in 1977. It was the very first venture capital (VC) firm to open an office on Sand Hill Road and is credited with creating the cluster of VC firms in that area.

Located in Menlo Park, California, Kleiner Perkins had access to the growing technology industries in the area. By the early 1970s, there were many semiconductor companies based in the Santa Clara Valley as well as early computer firms using their devices and programming and service companies. Venture capital firms suffered a temporary downturn in 1974, when the stock market crashed and investors were naturally wary of this new kind of investment fund. Nevertheless, the firm was still active in this period. By 1996, Kleiner Perkins had funded around 260 companies a total of $880 million. Beyond the original founders, notable members of the firm have included individuals such as John Doerr, Vinod Khosla, and Bill Joy.

Colin Powell joined as a "strategic" partner in 2005, while Al Gore joined as a partner in 2007 as part of a collaboration between Kleiner Perkins and Generation Investment Management. Mary Meeker joined the firm in 2010, and that year Kleiner Perkins expanded its practice to invest in growth stage companies. Meeker departed in 2019 to found Bond Capital. Mamoon Hamid from Social Capital and Ilya Fushman from Index Partners joined in 2017 and 2018 respectively, both as investing partners.

The New York Times has described Kleiner Perkins in 2005 as "perhaps Silicon Valley's most famous venture firm". The firm was described by Dealbook in 2009 as "one of Silicon Valley's top venture capital providers", and The Wall Street Journal in 2010 called it one of the "largest and most established" venture capital firms. By 2019 it had raised around $9 billion in 19 VC funds and four growth funds.

In May 2012, Ellen Pao, an employee, sued the firm for gender discrimination in Pao v. Kleiner Perkins, which the firm has vigorously denied. On 27 March 2015, after a month-long trial, the jury found against Pao on all claims. In June 2015, Pao filed an appeal. In September 2015, Pao announced she would no longer appeal the jury verdict.

In September 2018, Kleiner Perkins announced it was spinning out its digital growth team into a new independent firm. In January 2019, the firm embarked on a new strategy, rebooting under Hamid and Fushman; and raising US$600 million for its 18th fund, KP XVIII, that same month. The firm announced its 19th fund on 31 January 2019; the fund is focused on early stage investments in the "consumer, enterprise, hard tech and fintech" sectors.

In 2021, the firm raised a new growth fund, Select I, and, in 2022, announced VC funds, Select II and early-stage venture fund KP20. In 2024, it launched its 21st VC fund, KP21, along with its sixth growth fund, Select III..

In 2026, Kleiner Perkins announced it had raised $3.5 billion to invest in artificial intelligence startups reshaping industries including software, health care, transportation, and autonomy.

== Investments ==
In March 2008 Kleiner Perkins announced the iFund, a $100 million venture capital investment initiative that funds concepts related to the iPhone, and doubled that investment a year later. It was reported in April 2008 that Kleiner Perkins was raising funds for a $500 million growth-stage clean-technology fund. In October 2010, the firm launched a $250 million fund called sFund to focus on social startups, with co-investors such as Facebook, Zynga and Amazon.com. In early 2016, the firm raised $1.4 billion in KP XVII and DGF III.

The firm has been an early investor in more than 900 technology and life sciences firms since its founding, including Amazon.com, America Online, Applied Intuition, Beyond Meat, Citrix, Compaq, Electronic Arts, Genentech, Google, Glean, Intuit, Lotus Development, Netscape, Shazam, Shyp, Nest, Sun Microsystems, and Twitter. Some current investments include DJI, Handshake, Coursera, Shape Security, Farmers Business Network, Interos, IronNet Cybersecurity, Desktop Metal, Gusto, Plaid, Rippling, Robinhood, Slack, UiPath, Netlify, Loom, Viz.ai, and Looker. Very recent investments include Applied Intuition, Anthropic, Waymo, Glean, OpenEvidence, Rippling, Harvey, Modern Health, Pillar, Future, TogetherAI and STORD.

Kleiner Perkins paid $5 million in 1994 for around 25% of Netscape and profited from Netscape's IPO. Its investment of $8 million in Cerent was worth around $2 billion when the optical equipment maker was sold to Cisco Systems for $6.9 billion in August 1999. In 1999, Kleiner Perkins paid $12 million for a stake in Google. As of 2019, the market cap of Google's parent company was estimated at around $831 billion. As initial investors in Amazon.com Kleiner Perkins scored returns in excess of $1 billion on an $8 million investment.

== Key partners ==
Managing partners and advisors of the firm include:

- John Doerr (chairman)
- Brook Byers (founder)
- Al Gore
- Ilya Fushman
- Mamoon Hamid
- Ted Schlein

== See also ==
- List of venture capital firms
