= WBLO =

- Thomasville, North Carolina; United States
- Broadcast area: Piedmont Triad
- Frequency: 790 kHz
- Branding: Kaliente 106.9

Programming
- Language: Spanish
- Format: Tropical

Ownership
- Owner: Norsan Broadcasting; (WBLO/WIST-FM Operating, LLC)
- Sister stations: WIST-FM

History
- First air date: September 1947
- Former call signs: WTNC (1947–2003); WIST (2003–2004); WFIK (2004); WZXY (2004)
- Call sign meaning: "The Ball", former station moniker

Technical information
- Licensing authority: FCC
- Facility ID: 54552
- Class: D
- Power: 10,000 watts day; 26 watts night
- Transmitter coordinates: 35°57′41.5″N 80°2′12.1″W
- Translator: 106.9 W295CE (Winston-Salem)

Links
- Public license information: Public file; LMS
- Webcast: Listen live
- Website: kalientegso.com

WBLO (790 AM) is a radio station broadcasting a Spanish tropical radio format. Licensed to Thomasville, North Carolina, it serves the Piedmont Triad. The station is owned by Norsan Multimedia.

By day, WBLO is powered at 10,000 watts. To protect other stations on 790 AM, at night it reduces power to 26 watts. Programming is also heard on FM translator W295CE at 106.9 MHz in Winston-Salem.

== History ==
The station signed on in September 1947, and held the call sign WTNC. It originally ran 1,000 watts, during daytime hours only.

Buddy Poole and other partners bought WTNC and its FM station in 1984, and Poole served as general manager for 18 years.

When the station moved to High Point in the early 2000s, it played southern gospel music. On March 1, 2003, the station's call sign was changed to WIST. It aired an adult standards format along with WIST-FM. Its call sign was briefly changed to WFIK on November 12, 2004, before being changed to WZXY on November 26, 2004. The WBLO letters, the name "The Ball" and a sports talk format were adopted December 14, 2004.

On June 4, 2010, Norberto Sanchez of Norsan Multimedia said that his company would lease WIST-FM and WBLO, with an option to buy. WBLO kept its format until the end of the year.

== Translator ==
WBLO is also heard at 106.9 MHz, through a translator in Winston-Salem, North Carolina.

Call sign	Frequency	City of license	FID	ERP (W)	HAAT	Class	FCC info
W295CE	106.9 FM	Winston-Salem, North Carolina	140365	250	111 m (364 ft)	D	LMS
