= WIST-FM =

- Thomasville, North Carolina; United States
- Broadcast area: Piedmont Triad
- Frequency: 98.3 MHz
- Branding: La Raza 98.3

Programming
- Format: Regional Mexican

Ownership
- Owner: Norsan Broadcasting; (WBLO/WIST-FM Operating, LLC)
- Sister stations: WBLO

History
- First air date: 1949
- Former call signs: WTNC-FM (1949–1981); WEYE (1981–1984); WTHP (1984–1993); WFAZ (1993–1997); WIST-FM (1997–2004); WIST (2004–2005)

Technical information
- Licensing authority: FCC
- Facility ID: 27123
- Class: A
- ERP: 1,700 watts
- HAAT: 128 meters (420 ft)
- Transmitter coordinates: 35°57′41.5″N 80°2′12.1″W

Links
- Public license information: Public file; LMS
- Webcast: Listen live
- Website: larazalaraza.com/triad/

WIST-FM (98.3 MHz) is a Regional Mexican outlet serving the Piedmont Triad region of North Carolina. The Norsan Broadcasting station is licensed to Thomasville, North Carolina. The studios and transmitter are co-located in High Point, North Carolina.

== History ==
The station was first licensed on June 30, 1949, as WTNC-FM in Thomasville, North Carolina. During its history, its call signs have included WEYE. At one point, the station played country music during the day and urban contemporary music at night. During the 1980s, 98.3, with the call sign WTHP, was one of the first oldies stations in the area.

Buddy Poole, one of several partners who bought the station along with WTNC in 1984, was general manager from 1984 until 2002, when he bought WSAT in Salisbury.

On May 5, 1989, the station lost its tower when severe storms struck the area.

In the mid-1990s, under the calls WFAZ, 98.3 played contemporary Christian music. After the station's sale to GHB Broadcasting, a switch was made in 1997 to adult standards, mostly from the Satellite Music Networks format Stardust. The call letters WIST-FM were chosen at this time.

During most of 2004, the former WTNC was WIST, airing most of the FM station's programming. In 2005, WIST AM became sports talk station WBLO "790 The Ball". WAAA (now WTOB) in Winston-Salem began airing WIST-FM's programming at that time, but that station was not able to broadcast at full power and later changed to sports talk.

WIST-FM changed to classic country as "Country Legends 98.3" in October 2005.

On June 4, 2010, Norberto Sanchez of Norsan Multimedia said that his company would lease WIST-FM and WBLO, with an option to buy. WIST-FM would have a Spanish language format, including broadcasts of Carolina Panthers football, serving the Triad area. The change on the FM station took place at 6 P.M. June 30, after George Jones' "Who's Gonna Fill Their Shoes" played.
