= Wist =

Smartphone application

- Founded: United States (2013)
- Founder: Shana Zheng; Aigerim Shorman
- Defunct: 2014
- Headquarters: Miami, Florida, United States
- Area served: Worldwide
- Products: Apps
- Website: getwist.com

Wist was an application for smartphones that helped users find top five restaurants, bars and coffee shops nearby.

== History ==
Triptrotting, the previous version of Wist, was focused on combating easy tourism by connecting travelers and hosts online for local insight and suggestions. But in some months since its raise, the team found that users were more interested in just asking locals for their opinions rather than anything else. The redesigned application made recommendations based on several dimensions: location/time of day; what it knows about interests; and the behavior of others in social network. It gives just five recommendations at a time. Wist had over 450,000 places in its database, with a few thousand live for its launch in Miami.

== Devices ==
Wist was a free application for Apple iPhone.
