= Farmers Business Network =

American agriculture company

- Type: Private company
- Industry: Agriculture
- Founded: 2014; 12 years ago
- Founders: Amol Deshpande and Charles Baron
- Headquarters: San Carlos, California, United States; Canada
- Key people: Diego Casanello (CEO)
- Number of employees: 850 (approx.) (2021)
- Website: www.fbn.com

Farmers Business Network (FBN) is a North American farmer-to-farmer network, e-commerce and fintech platform based in San Carlos, California. Diego Casanello took over as CEO in 2024. In July 2025, the company said its network had grown to more than 117,000 member farms across about 187 million acres.

In 2016, FBN launched an online input buying system called FBN Direct. The platform aggregates data on seed prices and performances to assist farmers in agronomic resource management.

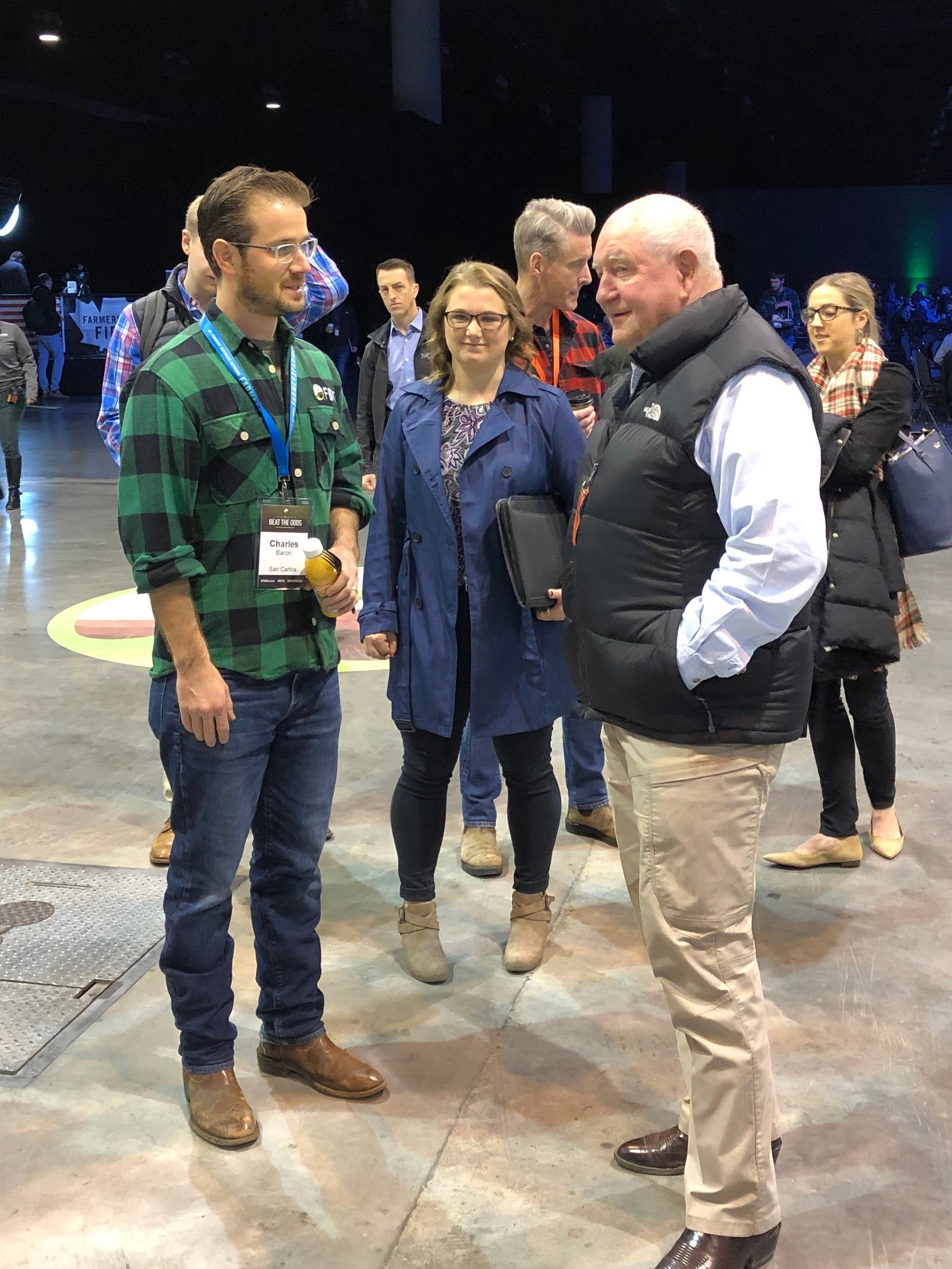
U.S. Secretary of Agriculture Sonny Perdue speaks with FBN Co-founder Charles Baron at the company's 2019 Farmer2Farmer event in Omaha, Nebraska.

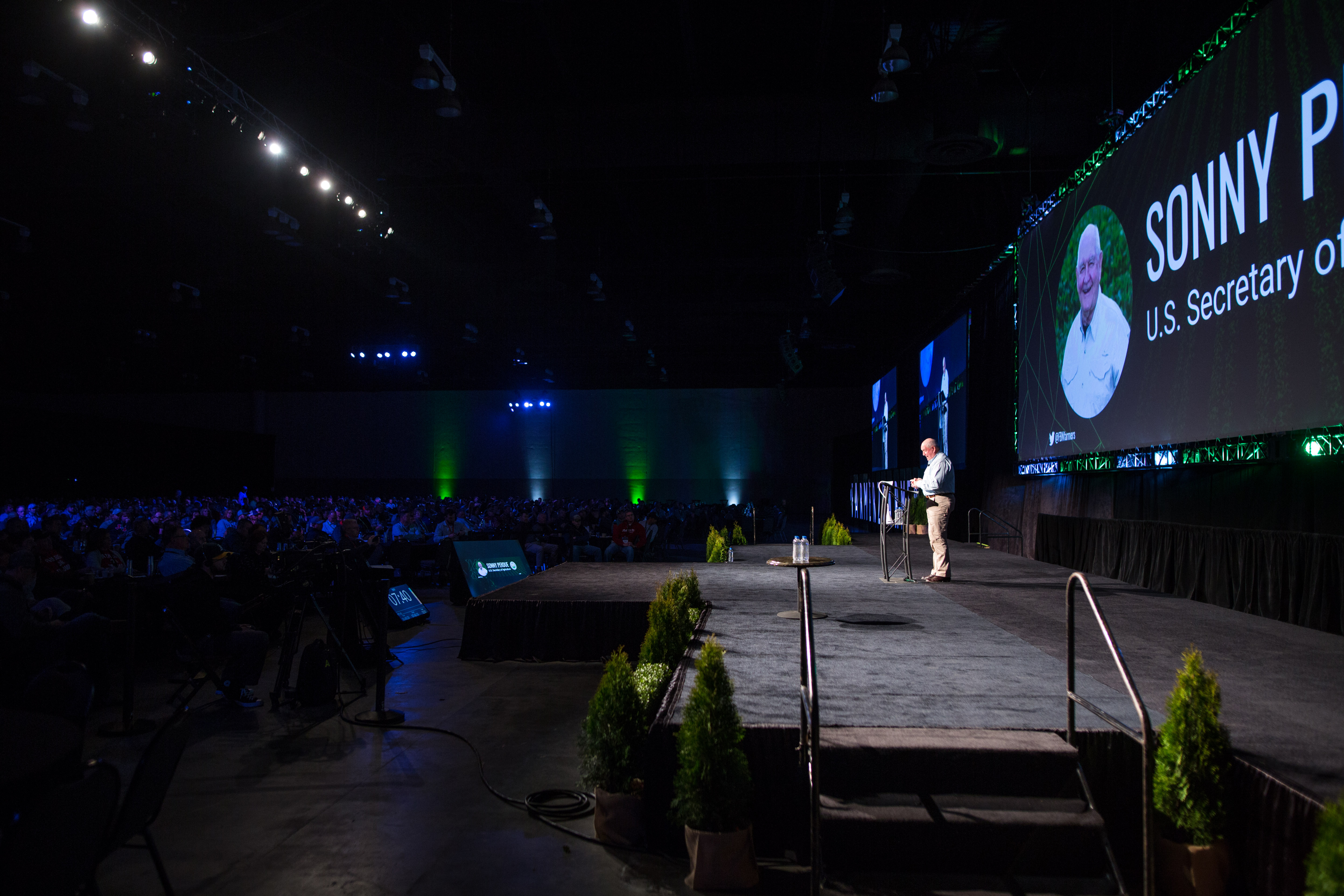
U.S. Secretary of Agriculture Sonny Perdue addresses Farmers Business Network's 2019 Farmer2Farmer Conference in Omaha, Nebraska.

The company introduced their first non-GMO corn and soybean seed offerings with F2F Genetics Network in August 2018. Some farmer members have reported saving thousands of dollars through the purchase of FBN seeds. FBN also sells seed from third-party brands; Seitec Genetics seed is available to growers in selected U.S. states through FBN Direct.

== Products and services ==
FBN operates two primary businesses: the FBN Direct® e-commerce marketplace for farm inputs and supplies, and FBN Finance for agricultural lending in the U.S. and Canada. FBN Direct launched in 2016.

FBN Finance

- Operating lines of credit for farm working capital.
- Input financing to purchase seeds, crop protection and other inputs through FBN Direct.
- Farm land loans for purchase, refinance and capital improvements; FBN also piloted a Regenerative Agriculture Financing (RAF) land-loan program offering interest-rate discounts tied to soil and water practices.

FBN Direct (Direct to Farm E-commerce Marketplace)

- Crop protection FBN offers a full line of high quality crop protection products, including herbicides, insecticides, fungicides and adjuvants.
- Fertilizer & nutrition, including a bulk fertilizer offering and FBN-branded biologicals/nutrition under the Farmers First line (e.g., biostimulants, soil probiotics/prebiotics, and high-uptake nutrients).
- Seed (including third-party brands such as Seitec Genetics in selected U.S. states).
- Livestock supplies and animal-health (pharmaceutical) products; FBN provides online ordering for prescription products supported by its pharmacy team.
- Livestock feed and nutrition (e.g., liquid supplements and lick tubs) across beef, dairy, swine, poultry and small ruminants.
- Farm & ranch supplies and equipment (e.g., fencing, tools, tanks and hardware).

Digital services

- AcreVision, a farmland evaluation tool that provides parcel-level estimated land values and comparable sales (launched July 2023).
- SeedFinder, a digital tool for comparing seed performance, prices, and genetics across geographies.
- Crop marketing, including market intelligence and sales tools for farmers.
- Community, an online forum where farmers share insights, ask questions, and collaborate.

== History ==
=== Anti-Competitive Interference by Incumbents ===
In February of 2020, a Canadian federal court issued subpoenas to a group of major agriculture companies in order to conduct an antitrust probe based on allegations that businesses cooperated in an attempt to block online farm-supply startup Farmers Business Network, Inc. (FBN).

In 2020, the Wall Street Journal reported that the Canadian Competition Bureau was investigating allegations that Bayer, BASF, and Corteva engaged in anti-competitive practices toward FBN in Canada. The investigation found that certain market players "engaged in communications with the goal of influencing manufacturers or wholesalers with respect to FBN."

=== Company Growth and Expansion ===
In 2022, FBN partnered with the Environmental Defense Fund to provide financing incentives for farmers who implemented regenerative practices. In 2023, the company launched an AI agronomy advisor to provide answers to farmer questions, such as combating pests, finding seed varieties, and preventing livestock diseases. Also that year, FBN opened a 198,000 square foot fulfillment center in Saskatoon. In March 2024, FBN surpassed $1 billion in financing provided through its farm operating lines.

In August 2024, FBN and ADM launched Gradable, a 50–50 joint venture to expand the Gradable sustainability and grain-procurement technology platform. At launch, Gradable reportedly had more than 20,000 farmer users across over 12 million acres, had scored more than 200 million bushels, and facilitated over $30 million in annual incentives for sustainable practices.

In January 2025, FBN launched a Regenerative Agriculture Financing (RAF) Land Loan pilot program supported by the Walton Family Foundation, offering 0.25–0.5 percentage point interest discounts to about 20 participating farmers who implement soil and water health practices that meet criteria developed by the Environmental Defense Fund and Gradable.

In June 2025, trade publication Drovers reported that FBN had expanded its livestock product line—adding Ridley Feeds, fencing supplies and equine products—and that the company served more than 13,000 livestock producers across the U.S.

In July 2025, FBN announced $50 million in new funding to expand its AI-powered platform, opened the marketplace to third-party sellers, and stated that its network had grown to over 117,000 member farms (representing about 187 million acres). The company also said its finance platform had extended nearly $3 billion in total financing to growers and that its “Norm” large language model had been expanded beyond agronomy to crop-marketing queries.

=== AI agronomic advisor (Norm) ===
In April 2023, FBN launched "Norm", an AI-powered agronomic advisor built on OpenAI's ChatGPT model. The tool is designed to answer questions spanning crop protection, input selection, livestock health and general agronomy, drawing on public datasets as well as FBN's proprietary information. Trade outlet Future Farming described Norm as an "industry-first" AI agronomic advisor at launch. Discussing the product’s aims, FBN’s VP of Technology, Kit Barron said: “There are so many different areas where we think we can help farmers maximize ROI.”

== Awards and recognition ==
In 2022, Fast Company named Farmers Business Network one of its “10 Most Innovative Companies in Data Science.”
