= Upfront Ventures =

American venture capital firm

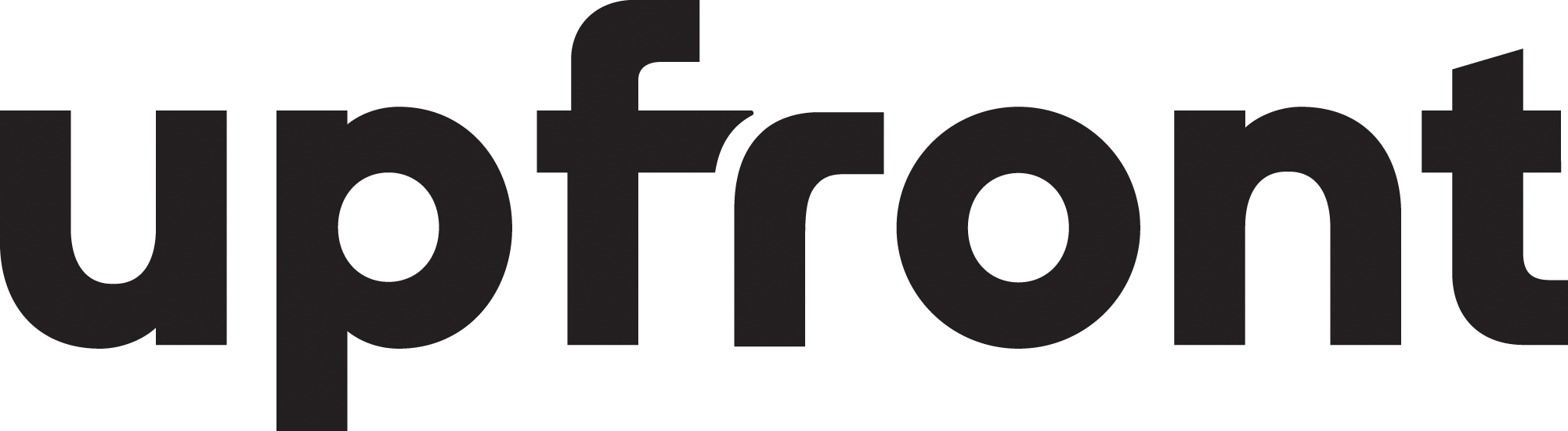
- Type: Private
- Industry: Venture Capital
- Founded: 1996
- Founders: Yves Sisteron, Steven Dietz, Steve Lebow
- Headquarters: Santa Monica, CA, U.S.
- Key people: Mark Suster; Yves Sisteron; Kara Nortman
- Website: www.upfront.com

Upfront Ventures, formerly known as GRP Partners, is a Santa Monica-based venture capital firm that invests in early-stage technology companies. It is one of the largest venture capital firms in Los Angeles, with $2 billion in total raised funds. Since its founding in 1996, Upfront Ventures has invested in more than 200 companies, with notable exits including Ulta, Overture, PayPal Credit, TrueCar, Disney Digital Network, Kyriba, and Ring.

== History ==
Upfront Ventures was founded by Yves Sisteron, Steven Dietz and Steve Lebow in 1996 in Century City, Los Angeles under the name GRP Partners.

GRP Partners was best known for investing in chain restaurants like P. F. Chang's and Starbucks, as well as retailers like Costco and Ulta, but it also invested in tech companies such as PayPal Credit, Overture, and Disney Digital Network. Mark Suster joined GRP Partners in 2007 as general manager, and became a managing partner in 2011.

In 2013, the company renamed itself to Upfront Ventures, a rebranding intended to reflect transparency and openness with startups in their early stages, and in reference to the entertainment industry's upfronts. The company also moved to Santa Monica, California, placing it in closer proximity to Los Angeles' tech and startup center, Silicon Beach, although the company makes investments in companies all over the world.The firm also opened a San Francisco office in 2020.

In 2015, the company named rap artist Chamillionaire as its "entrepreneur-in-residence", where he developed the Convoz app.

In July 2017, Upfront created a $400 million fund, specifically established for investing in startups over the next several years.

Upfront Ventures also hosts the Upfront Summit tech conference, held in Los Angeles.

In 2020, Upfront engaged in the payroll space by leading seed round funding for Clair.

Funding rounds
Year	Amount
2017	$402 million
2014	$280 million
2013^{†}	$200 million
2008	$185 million
2000	$390 million
Sources: (Note: ^{†} Both LA Times sources give conflicting amounts for 2013, with Andrea Chang reporting $200 million for 2013 (in an article published on June 27, 2013) and Paresh Dave reporting $230 million for 2013 (in an article published on July 4, 2017). The Chang source is used in the graph.)

== Investments ==
The firm’s notable investments include:

- Apeel Sciences
- Deliv
- Qordoba
- Qualys
- thredUP
- UGO Networks
