= Ross School of Business =

Business school of the University of Michigan

Coordinates: 42°16′21.8″N 83°44′15.2″W

University of Michigan Ross School of Business
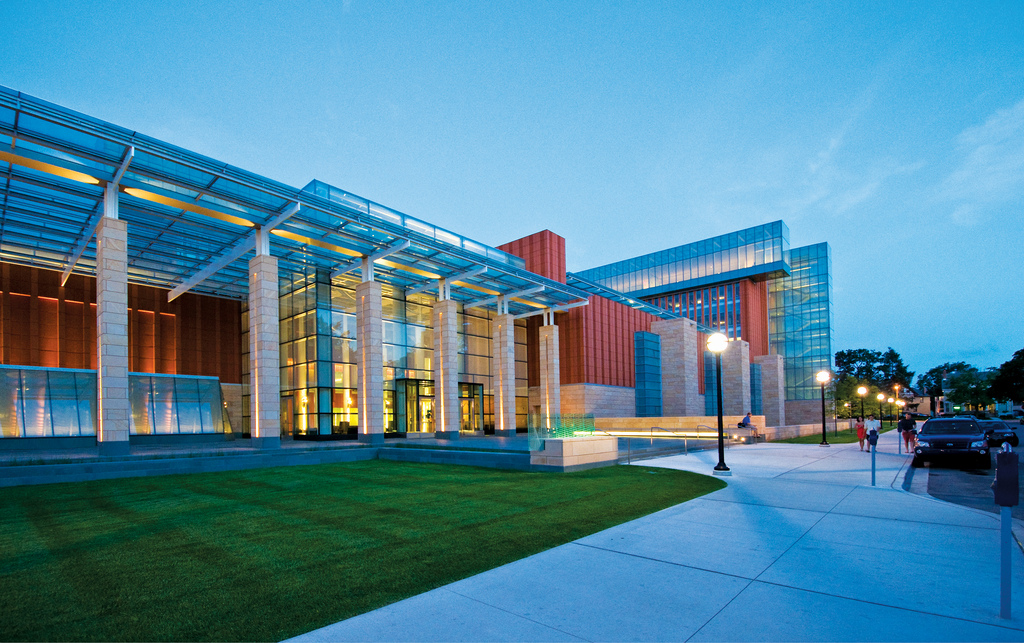
- Other name: Stephen M. Ross School of Business
- Former name: University of Michigan School of Business Administration (1924–2004)
- Motto: Developing leaders who make a positive difference in the world
- Type: Public business school
- Established: 1924; 102 years ago
- Parent institution: University of Michigan
- Accreditation: AACSB International
- Endowment: $435 million (2016)
- Dean: Sharon Matusik
- Faculty: 210
- Undergraduates: 1,422
- Postgraduates: 1,873
- Location: Ann Arbor, Michigan, U.S.
- Alumni: 46,000
- Website: michiganross.umich.edu

The University of Michigan Ross School of Business (branded as Michigan Ross) is the business school of the University of Michigan, a public research university in Ann Arbor, Michigan.

The school was originally established in 1924 as the School of Business Administration. Today, it offers bachelor's, master's, and doctoral degrees, as well as an executive education program. Michigan Ross also collaborates with other colleges and schools at the University of Michigan to offer dual degree programs. Additionally, the school's Executive Education program includes a Distinguished Leader Certificate. Michigan Ross maintains the tenth largest endowment among all business schools in the United States, with a total of US$435 million as of 2016.

== History ==
=== Twentieth century ===
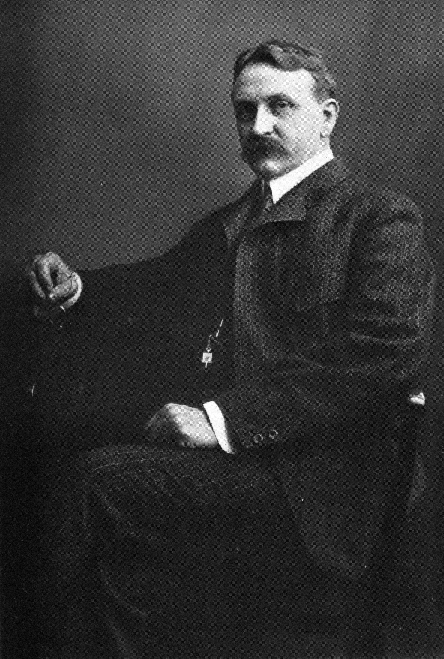
Henry Carter Adams, former chairman of the economics department

The first business courses were offered at the University of Michigan in 1900. Economics Department Chairman Henry Carter Adams oversaw the expanding practical courses to prepare students for business careers. The idea for the school came from the economics department. In 1918, the university's College of Literature, Science, and the Arts began issuing a Certificate of Business Administration. In 1923, University President Marion LeRoy Burton hired Edmund Ezra Day to serve as the founding dean of a new business school.

The University of Michigan School of Business Administration was founded in 1924; it offered a two-year Master of Business Administration after three years of general studies. There were 14 faculty members, including one of the first women to be part of a business school. In 1925, the Bureau of Business Research was founded to facilitate and coordinate faculty research and publish research monographs and case studies.

In 1926, after serving three years, Day was succeeded as dean by Clare Griffin, who initially came to the university to teach marketing. The same year, faculty member William Andrew Paton founded The Accounting Review. In 1935, the school began offering a PhD in Business Administration. In 1938, the first evening Master of Business Administration (MBA) classes were offered. In 1940, school enrollment reached 200 students. Between 1942 and 1943, a Bachelor of Business Administration (BBA) degree was introduced.

In 1943, Russell Stevenson became the school's third dean. In 1947, enrollment exceeded 1,000 students, reaching 800 BBA students and 400 MBA students by 1949. In 1948, the school opened a new building that cost $2.5 million and had a nine-story tower. The same year, prominent economist Paul McCracken joined the faculty. From 1950 to 1959, the school introduced the Public Utility Executive Program, its first stand-alone, non-degree program for continuing education of business executives.

Floyd Bond became the school's fourth dean in 1960. The same year, the school launched its first international joint venture in Taiwan and Bond appointed a committee to better integrate global business into the school's curriculum. In 1966, Bond established the Ad Hoc Committee on Educational Programs in Business Administration for Negroes, which tried to attract more African-American students but the initiative and a number of student strikes and other protests in the following years demanded more minority enrollment. In 1971, the school began a $1.5 million expansion of the physical facilities and assembly hall. By 1971, total enrollment exceeded 1,300, more than three-quarters of whom were graduate students with 370 in the Evening MBA Program. In 1972, the school's first two alumni clubs in New York and California, held their first meetings. In 1974, Alfred Edwards joined the faculty as a professor of business administration and director of the research division, later becoming known as the school's ambassador for diversity.

Gilbert Whitaker became the school's fifth dean in 1979 and established an enlarged Office of Development & Alumni Relations. The following year, total degree-program enrollment reached 2,000, including about 600 BBA students, while the number of faculty members exceeded 100. From 1980 to 1989, the school established 17 joint-degree programs with other U-M units. In 1982, Whitaker announced a $15 million fundraising campaign for three new buildings, including a library. The campaign raised $17 million and the buildings opened by 1984. In 1983, the school joined the Consortium for Graduate Study in Management and began offering a Master of Accounting degree. In 1990, the school received a federal grant to establish a Center for International Business Education.

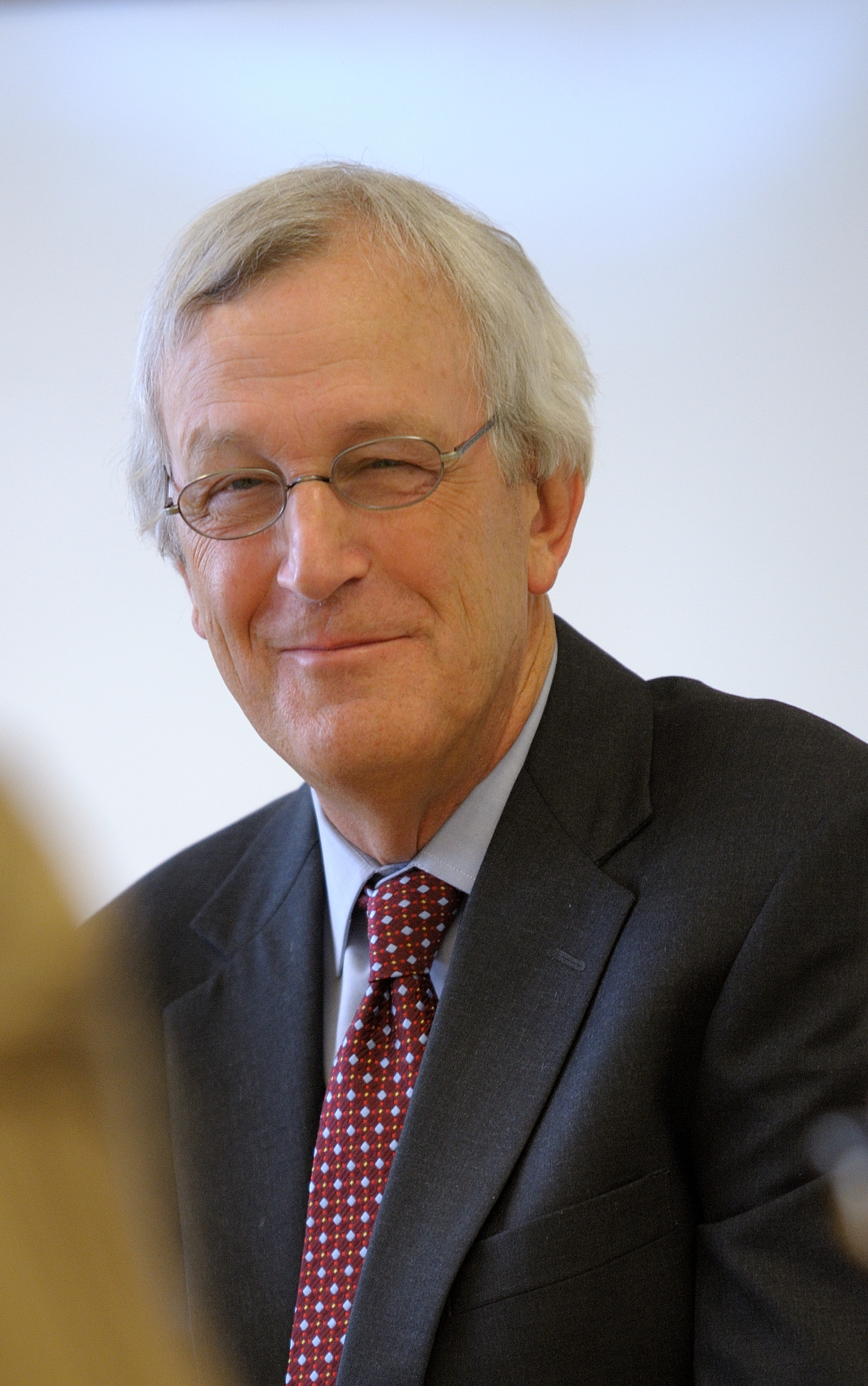
B. Joseph White

In 1990, B. Joseph White became the school's sixth dean. In 1991, White and Associate Dean Paul Danos introduced a major MBA curriculum overhaul by initiating the Multidisciplinary Action Project (MAP), a full-time, seven-week project that allowed teams of students to work on real-world business challenges for sponsor companies. After a pilot run, it became part of the MBA core curriculum in 1993. In 1995, an international MAP option was created as a separate program. In 2015, MAP became an option in the undergraduate curriculum.

In 1992, the William Davidson Institute was founded. In 1995, the Tauber Institute was founded as a joint project with the College of Engineering. In 1996, the Global MBA Program is introduced, allowing students to study abroad in one-month terms. The same year, the Frederick A. and Barbara M. Erb Environmental Management Institute was established. In 1999, the Samuel Zell and Robert H. Lurie Institute for Entrepreneurial Studies was founded. In 2000, Sam Wyly Hall opened to house Executive Education and other programs. The same year, the number of faculty members approached 200. In 2001, the school introduced an Executive MBA Program, which targeted business leaders in supervisory positions.

During White's tenure, other initiatives, such as research on how to supplement the GMAT, helped cement the school's reputation for innovations that produce business leaders.

=== Twenty-first century ===
In 2001, Robert J. Dolan became the school's seventh dean. The next year, the John R. and Georgene M. Tozzi Electronic Business and Finance Center was established. In 2003, several faculty members published "Positive Organizational Scholarship: Foundations of a New Discipline", a study on how to create positive organizations. The school would later found the Center for Positive Organizations. In 2004, alumnus Stephen M. Ross donated US$100 million to the school, which was renamed the Stephen M. Ross School of Business. This was the largest-ever gift to a U.S. business school and to the University of Michigan. The Ross gift funded a campus overhaul; the school demolished 180,000 square feet (17,000 m^{2}) of existing building space and renovated or added 270,000 square feet (25,000 m^{2}).

The Ross Leadership Initiative, later renamed the Sanger Leadership Center, was established in 2006 to improve the leadership development of MBA students. In 2009, the school's Master of Supply Chain Management degree program was introduced. The same year, the $145 million Stephen M. Ross building opened. In 2010, a Weekend MBA Program was introduced, allowing students to complete an MBA in two years while working full-time.

In 2011, Alison Davis-Blake became the school's eighth and first female dean. In 2012, the Executive MBA Program was expanded to a second campus in Los Angeles.

Stephen M. Ross made a second $100 million gift as a part of a larger fundraising effort in 2013; the gift aimed "to help complete the vision of a unified business school complex, including one new building, one fully renovated building, and other improvements". The same year, a minor in business was offered for non-business undergraduate students. In late 2013, the school launched a major fundraising campaign.

In 2014, a new 10-month Master of Management degree was introduced. The same year, the school began sponsoring the annual Positive Business Conference. During Davis-Blake's tenure, the school broadened its global presence, increasing the number of overseas experiences for students and beginning a partnership with Shanghai Jiao Tong University. The Desai Accelerator for startup businesses—a joint effort between Ross and the University of Michigan College of Engineering—opened in downtown Ann Arbor in 2014. The same year, Davis-Blake oversaw a large, donor-funded construction project that includes the new Jeff T. Blau Hall, as well as renovations to several older buildings on the business campus.

Davis-Blake announced in 2015 that she would step down at the end of her five-year term in 2016 to pursue a broader role in higher education. In 2015, Michigan Ross announced the Alumni Advantage program that offers free lifetime open-enrollment executive education tuition for all its degree alumni and half-price tuition for non-Ross UM alumni. In 2016, the Jeff T. Blau Hall and the renovated Kresge Hall opened.

In 2016, Scott DeRue became the school's ninth dean. He joined the Michigan Ross faculty in 2007 and has been an associate dean. In 2017, enrollment exceeded 3,000 students, including about 1,600 BBA students and 800 full-time MBA students. Nearly 40% of incoming BBA students are women, and about half are from other states.

Francine Lafontaine stepped in as the business school's interim dean, effective May 24, 2021. The following year, the university's leaders selected Sharon F. Matusik as the college's next dean. Matusik's term began on August 1, 2022, and ends on July 31, 2027.

== Rankings ==
Business school rankings

United States
- QS MBA: 12
- Bloomberg MBA: 14
- USNWR MBA: 13
- USNWR Undergraduate: 4

Global
- QS MBA: 22
- Financial Times MBA: 29

U.S. News & World Report, in its 2019 ranking of top MBA programs, placed Michigan Ross seventh in its ranking of business schools in the United States; it was tied with the University of California at Berkeley's Haas School of Business. In the same publication and year's BBA rankings, Michigan Ross was ranked fourth. In the most recent U.S. News & World Report for 2023, the school ranked 10th.

In the U.S. News & World Report specialty rankings for 2019, Michigan Ross's full-time MBA program was ranked third in the Management and Production/Operations categories, fourth in Marketing and Accounting, fifth in Nonprofit and International, sixth in Supply Chain/Logistics, seventh in Entrepreneurship, and tenth in Finance. In 2023 Bloomberg Businessweek ranked the MBA program 9th overall.

== Facilities and institutes ==
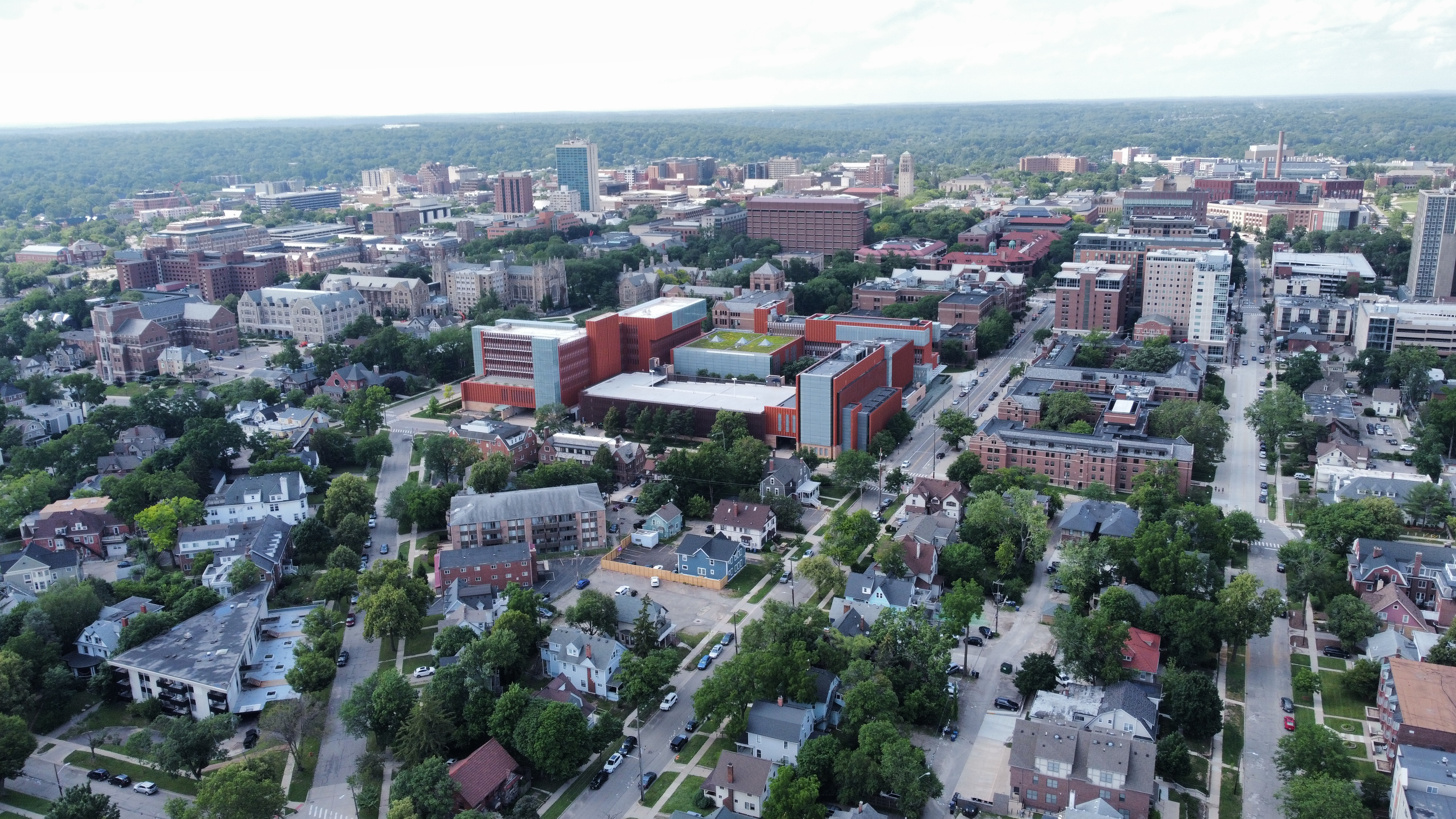
The Ross School of Business facilities on the university's central campus

Upon its establishment in 1924, the business school was located in Tappan Hall, the oldest extant classroom building on campus. The original 1894 wing was designed by the Detroit firm Spier & Rohns, and the south wing was designed by Luckenbach / Ziegelman & Partners.

The school moved to its current site in 1948. Authorized by the Regents in July 1945, the site was in the northern half of a block surrounded by Monroe Street, Tappan Street, Hill Street, and Haven Street. It was purchased at the time construction was begun. Ten private dwellings were demolished for to make way for the construction, which began in August 1946. The business school was the first skyscraper on campus and was designed by architects Lee and Kenneth C. Black, of Lansing, Michigan.

New York City real estate developer Stephen M. Ross (BBA '62) gave a gift of $100 million to the business school, the second largest donation ever to a U.S. business school and the largest gift to the university in its history. In recognition, the Board of Regents met in special session on September 9, 2004, to rename the school the Stephen M. Ross School of Business. New York-based architecture firm Kohn Pedersen Fox (KPF) designed the 270,000-square-foot building. In 2013, Ross announced a second gift to the school of $100 million. The second gift was used for facilities upgrades, including high-tech classrooms, a new career services space, and additional areas for practical research; as well as student scholarships. KPF designed this second phase, as well, including the new-construction Blau Hall, renovated Kresge Hall, and recladded Wyly Hall. In September 2017, Ross donated an additional $50 million to the school.

=== The William Davidson Institute ===
The William Davidson Institute (WDI) is a not-for-profit, independent, research and educational institute that was created in 1992 when Guardian Industries made a 20-year financial commitment to establish an institute at the University of Michigan Business School. The institute was named for Guardian Industries' chairman, president and CEO William Davidson. WDI supports international activity at the University of Michigan by funding research, hosting visiting scholars, organizing seminars and speaker series, sponsoring summer internships, and creating dynamic and current teaching materials. Since 2006, more than 1,800 MBA students have participated in more than 450 international projects. WDI's publication initiative houses a collection of international business and social impact teaching materials. A publishing subsidiary named WDI Publishing was founded in 2007.

=== The Erb Institute for Global Sustainable Enterprise ===
Created in 1996 by a donation from Frederick A. Erb (BBA '47) and his wife Barbara, the Erb Institute for Global Sustainable Enterprise is a partnership between the Stephen M. Ross School of Business and the School for Environment and Sustainability (SEAS) to provide education and opportunities for research into business sustainability. The Erb Institute's Dual-Degree MBA/MS Program, in which students earn a Master of Business Administration from the Ross School and a Master of Science from SEAS in 2 1/2 to 3 years, has received many accolades. In 2013, Michigan Ross (Erb Institute) received the top ranking for MBA programs with a Sustainability specialty (Bloomberg Business MBA Rankings)

=== The Joel D. Tauber Institute for Global Operations ===
Joel D. Tauber donated $5 million in 1995 to establish the Joel D. Tauber Manufacturing Institute, which trains graduate engineering and business students in operations management. The program is run jointly with the University's College of Engineering. In 2007, the institute was renamed the (Joel D.) Tauber Institute for Global Operations to recognize increased interest from service, healthcare, IT, and retail organizations. In 2012 the institute was awarded the first UPS George D. Smith Prize from INFORMS for its effective and innovative preparation of students to be practitioners of operations research, management science or analytics.

=== The Zell–Lurie Institute ===
The Samuel Zell & Robert H. Lurie Institute for Entrepreneurial Studies provides the curriculum, program initiatives, community involvement, and alumni outreach activities that provide resources for graduates of the Ross School of Business. In 1999, a $10 million donation from Samuel Zell and Ann Lurie on behalf of her husband Robert H. Lurie established the Samuel Zell & Robert H. Lurie Institute for Entrepreneurial Studies at the Business School.

=== The Wolverine Venture Fund ===
The Wolverine Venture Fund (WVF) is a multimillion-dollar venture capital fund operated by the Ross School of Business. The fund was started in 1997 by Karen Bantel. The fund invests with the active involvement of MBA students, faculty assistance, and an advisory board composed of professional venture capitalists and entrepreneurs. It invests in early-stage, emerging growth companies. The Fund typically provides US$50,000 to $200,000 in seed and first-stage funding rounds with other venture capital funds and angel investors. The Wolverine Venture Fund, the oldest such U.S. venture, earned $1 million when Intralase, a U-M spin-off technology company, went public.

=== The Center For Positive Organizations ===
Founded in 2002 as the Center for Positive Organizational Scholarship, the center's mission is "to inspire and enable leaders to build high-performing organizations that bring out the best in people". It researches topics such as positive leadership, meaning and purpose, ethics and virtues, and relationships and culture in an organizational setting. Starting in 2014, it sponsors an annual Positive Business Conference.

=== The Sanger Leadership Center ===
The Sanger Leadership Center at Michigan Ross was named for a gift by Steve and Karen Sanger in 2015, The center offers leadership development programming for all University of Michigan students. Its signature initiatives open to U-M students include the Leadership Crisis Challenge, Impact Challenge, Story Lab, and Legacy Lab. Sanger uses leadership development theories and tools developed at Michigan Ross, such as the Michigan Model of Leadership.

== Student life ==
Ross School of Business students publish a newspaper called the Monroe Street Journal and houses the Michigan Journal of Business, the first undergraduate-level academic journal in the field of business.

A Ross MBA community tradition is the Ross MBA college football tailgate, which takes place before and after every home game at "The Bus", a 1985 Ford school bus that is painted in maize and blue, Michigan's colors, and is decorated with a dance floor, a DJ on the roof, and couches in the interior. On game days, The Bus is parked in a nearby Lumber Yard for an event called the Ross MBA tailgate, which attracts over 500 students, alumni, and friends. As of 2013, this tradition had been intact for the last decade. After the bus "died" in 2013, a group of MBA students started a crowdfunding campaign on Tilt.com to purchase a new mobile tailgate bus.

== Michigan Journal of Business ==
Michigan Journal of Business
- Discipline: Business
- Language: English
- Edited by: Roger Zhong, Kabir Sodhi

Publication details
- History: 2007–present
- Publisher: Stephen M. Ross School of Business (United States)
- Frequency: Biannually
- Open access: Yes

Standard abbreviations
- ISO 4: Mich. J. Bus.

Indexing
- ISSN: 1941-5745
- LCCN: 2008214414
- OCLC no.: 644450557

Links
- Journal homepage; Online archive

Michigan Journal of Business is a biannual, peer-reviewed, open access, academic journal that is published by undergraduate students at the Stephen M. Ross School of Business (University of Michigan). It was established in 2007 by William Moon and publishes theses, empirical research, case studies, and theories relating to accounting, economics, finance, marketing, management, operations management, information systems, business law, corporate ethics, and public policy. The editorial staff is composed of students of the University of Michigan. The journal is abstracted and indexed in EBSCO's Business Source Complete database. Archival issues are available at the MJB's website.

== Notable alumni ==
=== Activists ===
- Shereef Akeel (BUS: BBA), lawyer notable for pursuing human rights and civil liberties cases
- Terence A. G. Davis (BUS: MBA 1962), member of the UK Parliament House of Commons for 28 years, now Secretary General of the Council of Europe and human rights activist
- Rachna Dhingra (BUS: BBA), social activist working in Bhopal with the survivors of the Bhopal gas tragedy
- Jesse Hill Jr. (BUS: MBA 1949), chairman, president and CEO (emeritus) of Atlanta Life Insurance Co.; businessman and civil rights leader who was named the recipient of the 2006 Ivan Allen Jr. Prize for Progress and Service
- Jerry White (BUS: MBA 2005), co-founder and executive director of the Landmine Survivors Network (LSN)
- Hao Wu (BUS: MBA 2000), documentary filmmaker and blogger

=== Advertising/marketing ===
- John M. Fahey, Jr., (BUS: MBA 1975), president and CEO of the National Geographic Society; former chairman, president and CEO of Time Life Inc
- Stephen Sanger (BUS: MBA 1970), CEO of General Mills

=== Arts and entertainment ===
- William Davidson (BUS: BBA 1947), founder of the William Davidson Institute at the Ross School of Business; chairman of Guardian Industries; owner of the Detroit Pistons, Detroit Shock, and Tampa Bay Lightning sports teams
- DJ Graffiti (BUS: BBA), Michigan-based DJ, producer and manager
- Gary Gilbert (BBA), Oscar-nominated producer; founder and president of Gilbert Films, a motion picture production and financing company based in Los Angeles, California
- Lynn Isenberg, author, producer, and screenwriter; best known for her trilogy of comedy novels: The Funeral Planner, The Funeral Planner Goes to Washington and The Funeral Planner Goes Global
- Tusshar Kapoor (BUS: BBA), Bollywood actor
- Steve Richardson (BUS: MBA), puzzle creator and founder of Stave Puzzles
- David Shayman, more widely known as Disco D (BUS: BBA 2002) - producer of Ghettotech
- Vienna Teng, Taiwanese-American pianist and singer-songwriter

=== Athletics ===
- Red Berenson, (BUS: BBA 1962, MBA 1966), former head coach of the Michigan Wolverines men's ice hockey team
- Jason Botterill (BUS: MBA 2007), General manager of the Buffalo Sabres; former professional ice hockey left winger
- Bill Frieder (BUS: BBA 1964), former Michigan basketball coach
- Ron Johnson, (BUS: BBA 1969), former NFL football player; named by the National Football Foundation & College Hall of Fame (NFF), as its chairman in 2006
- Tom Lewand (MBA 1996), named president of the Detroit Lions on December 29, 2008
- Harshvardhan Joshi (MBA 2025), mountaineer, leader of first carbon-neutral expedition to Mount Everest
- William C. Martin, (BUS: MBA 1965), President (emeritus), United States Olympic Committee
- Robert Pelinka (BUS: BBA 1993, LAW: JD 1996), lawyer, sports agent and former college basketball player
- Guy Sasson (BBA 2006), Israeli Paralympic wheelchair tennis player; Grand Slam champion
- Bert Sugar, (LAW: JD 1961; BUS: MBA 1961), former publisher-editor of The Ring and Boxing Illustrated
- Zoltan Mesko (BUS: BBA 2009), punter in the NFL

=== Banking/financial ===
- William S. Demchak, (BUS: MBA), President and Chief Executive Officer of PNC Financial Services Group.
- Haluk Dinçer (BUS: MBA), President of the Retail and Insurance Group of Sabancı Holding, one of the two largest industrial and financial conglomerates of Turkey
- David Kellermann, (BUS: BSBA), Chief Financial Officer of Freddie Mac
- Shailesh Kumar (BUS: M.B.A.), writer, entrepreneur, private investor, and founder of Value Stock Guide, a financial website providing information about investing
- Herbert "Bart" H. McDade III, President and COO of Lehman Brothers at the time of its bankruptcy
- Euh Yoon-Dae (BUS: Ph.D.), Chairman of KB Financial Group and of the Presidential Council on Nation Branding, Korea

=== Consulting/accounting ===
- Gary Hamel (BUS: MBA PhD 1990), co-author of The Core Competence of the Corporation; selected "Number One Guru" by The Economist magazine in 2003

=== Education ===
- Charles E. Bayless (BUS: MBA), former president of West Virginia University Institute of Technology
- Söhnke M. Bartram (BUS: Ph.D.), professor in the Department of Finance at Warwick Business School
- Vivian Carpenter (BUS: MBA), accounting, academic, and business executive
- Wynne Chin (BUS: MBA, PhD), information systems, academic, and consultant
- James Danko (BUS: MBA), president of Butler University (since 2011)
- Joseph William Dellapenna (BUS: BBA), professor of law at Villanova University School of Law
- Joel Demski (BUS: MBA), accounting researcher and educator
- Ole-Kristian Hope (BUS: MBA), Norwegian economist; professor of accounting at the Rotman School of Management, known for his work on accounting standards and disclosure practices
- Carl Lygo (BUS: MBA), British barrister, academic, and Vice-Chancellor of BPP University, a division of the Apollo Group
- Douglas A. Shackelford (PhD 1990), dean of the UNC Kenan–Flagler Business School
- B. Joseph White (BUS: PhD 1975),16th President of the University of Illinois; former dean of the Ross School of Business
- Lynn Perry Wooten (Ph.D. 1995), 9th President of Simmons University; former dean of the Charles H. Dyson School of Applied Economics and Management

=== Entrepreneurs ===
- Sam Belnavis (BUS: MBA), executive in automobile racing; as an African-American, one of the few minority persons to have owned a NASCAR racing team
- Shailesh Kumar, businessperson; founder of Value Stock Guide
- Frank Legacki, former president and CEO of Kaepa, Inc., an athletic footwear company based in San Antonio, Texas.
- Sam Wyly (BUS: MBA 1957), serial entrepreneur; owner of the Bonanza Restaurants chain; founder of computer companies acquired by Computer Associates, SBC Communications, and Datran; chairman of Sterling Software

=== Federal Reserve/FDIC/OCC/Treasury ===
- L. William Seidman (BUS: MBA 1949), former 14th Chairman of the Federal Deposit Insurance Corporation (FDIC); vice chairman and CFO of the Phelps Dodge Corporation (1977–1982); managing partner of Seidman & Seidman (1968–1974); Chief Commentator of CNBC

=== Government and judiciary ===
- Roger W. Baker (BUS: MBA), Assistant Secretary for Information and Technology for the United States Department of Veterans Affairs
- John E. Braun (BUS: MBA), Republican State Senator, representing the 20th district of Washington
- Lawrence E. Butler (BUS: MBA), United States Ambassador to the Republic of Macedonia (2002–2005)
- Thomas Cane (BUS: BBA), former Chief Judge of the Wisconsin Court of Appeals
- James Paul Churchill (BUS: BBA), United States federal judge
- Peter D. Clark (BUS: MBA), Regional Chair of Ottawa-Carleton (1991–1997)
- Howard Flight, (BUS: MBA), British Member of Parliament
- David Hermelin, (BUS: BBA 1958), entrepreneur, philanthropist, and former United States Ambassador to Norway; Ross School benefactor
- John Carl Hinshaw (BUS), former United States Representative from California
- Pete Hoekstra, (BUS: MBA 1977), Congressional Representative from Michigan;
- H. Russel Holland (BUS: BBA 1958), United States District Judge
- Mark Kennedy, (BUS: MBA 1983), former member of the U.S. Congress from Minnesota
- David McKeague (BUS: BBA 1968, JD 1971), United States federal judge
- Donald R. McMonagle (BUS: MBA) (Retired Colonel, USAF), Manager of Launch Integration, at the Kennedy Space Center, Florida
- Glenn Everell Mencer (BUS: BBA 1949), United States federal judge
- Herizo Razafimahaleo (BUS: MBA), former politician in Madagascar, three-time presidential candidate, and Deputy Prime Minister and Foreign Minister (1997–98)
- Ronald Weiser (BUS: BBA 1966), former Ambassador to Slovakia

=== Healthcare ===
- Ragavendra R Baliga (BUS: MBA 2004), Director of Cardiology at Ohio State University Hospital East; co-founder of NextServices
- Mahendra Bhandari (BUS: MBA), Indian surgeon
- Nancy E. Dunlap (BUS: MBA), physician, researcher, and business administrator; dean of the University of Virginia School of Medicine
- Scott Ransom (BUS: MBA 1997), physician, consultant, researcher, investor and healthcare management expert; past President of the University of North Texas Health Science Center

=== Hospitality ===
- Cameron Read (BUS: MBA 2002), Chief Financial Officer, US & Canada, Marriott International

=== Industrials ===
- H. David Burton (BUS: MBA), the thirteenth presiding bishop of The Church of Jesus Christ of Latter-day Saints (LDS Church) from 1995 to 2012.
- Charles "Chuck" Conaway (BUS: MBA), businessman best known for having been the CEO of Kmart; former president and chief operating officer of CVS Corporation
- John DeLorean (BUS: MBA 1957), General Motorsqq1 Group Vice President and Designer of the DeLorean
- Dave Deno (BUS: MBA), former CEO of Quizno's and former COO of Yum! Brands
- John V. Faraci (BUS: MBA 1974), CEO of International Paper
- Frederick Henderson (BUS: BBA 1980), former chairman of GM Europe and a GM group vice president; named GM Vice Chairman and Chief Financial Officer in 2005
- Archie McCardell (BUS: MBA), American business leader; former chief executive officer, president, and chairman of the board at the International Harvester
- Michael Roney (BUS: MBA 1981), CEO of Bunzl
- Roger B. Smith (BUS: 1947, MBA 1953), former chairman and CEO of General Motors
- David N. Weidman (BUS: MBA 1980), CEO of Celanese; member of the Board of Celanese (2004–, as chairman, 2007–); Society of Chemical Industry Chairman

=== Information technology ===
- David Bohnett (BUS: MBA 1980), founder and CEO of GeoCities
- Bharat Desai (BUS: MBA 1981), co-founder, president and CEO, Syntel Inc.
- Warren Lieberfarb (BUS), chairman of Warren N. Lieberfarb & Associates, LLC.; serves on the board of directors of Hughes Telematics, Inc.; board member of Sirius Satellite Radio and thePlatform
- Paul Saleh (BS, MS; BUS: MBA 1985), CFO, Nextel Communications Inc.
- James R. Scapa (BUS: MBA), CEO and chairman of Altair Engineering
- Richard Snyder (BA 1977, BUS: MBA with distinction 1979, LAW: JD 1982, Certified Public Accountant), Chairman of the board of Gateway Inc., venture capitalist, and Governor of Michigan (2011–2019)

=== Journalism ===
- Mark Bernstein (BUS: MBA), former director of press pool operations during the Clinton Administration
- George Blaha (BUS: MBA), radio and television play-by-play voice of the Detroit Pistons since the 1976–77 NBA season
- Richard Lui (BUS: MBA), news anchor for MSNBC and CNN Worldwide
- Carol Cain (BUS: MBA 1999), Emmy Senior producer and host of Michigan Matters

=== Real estate and infrastructure ===
- Stephen M. Ross (BUS: BBA 1962), real estate developer

=== Venture capital ===
- Christopher Ilitch (BUS: BBA 1987), president and CEO of Ilitch Holdings, Inc.
- William D. Johnson (BUS: MBA), principal of In-Q-Tel
- Brad Keywell (BUS: BBA 1991; LAW: JD 1993), Managing Partner of Bristol Ventures LLC
- Adam Lilling (BUS), entrepreneur and venture capitalist
- Tige Savage (BUS: MBA 1998), co-founder and managing partner of Revolution LLC

== Professors ==
- Madeleine Albright, WDI visiting scholar and former United States Secretary of State
- Kim S. Cameron, academic
- Joshua D. Coval, economist
- Gary Hamel, co-author of The Core Competence of the Corporation
- Andrew Hoffman, business academic
- Paul McCracken, advisor to presidents
- Gerald C. Meyers, author and former chairman and CEO of American Motors Corporation (1977–1982)
- Sarah Miller, health economist and winner of the 2022 ASHEcon medal
- C.K. Prahalad, Paul and Ruth McCracken Distinguished University Professor of Corporate Strategy
- Noel Tichy, Director of Global Development at GE's Crotonville under Jack Welch
- Marina von Neumann Whitman, Nixon's Council of Economic Advisers (1973–74)
- W. Chan Kim, co-author of Blue Ocean Strategy

== See also ==
- Economics
- Glossary of economics
- List of United States business school rankings
- List of business schools in the United States
- List of University of Michigan people (people associated with the school are marked with BUS)
