= Antonio Bernardo =

Antonio Bernardo may refer to:

- Antonio Bernardo (humanist) (c. 1430 – c. 1510), Venetian
- Antonio Bernardo (neurosurgeon) (born 20th century), Italian
- Antonio Bernardo (academic administrator) (born 20th century), American
