= Shailesh =

Shailesh is an Indian name. Notable people with the name include:

- Shailesh Datar, Indian actor
- Shailesh Gulabani, Indian actor
- Shailesh Jogia, Indian snooker player
- Shailesh Kumar (disambiguation), several people
- Shailesh Lodha, Indian writer
- Shailesh Matiyani, Indian writer
- Shailesh Nayak, Indian scientist
- Shailesh Parmar, Indian politician
- Shailesh R. Singh, Indian film producer
- Shailesh Shah, Indian film producer
- Shailesh Shrestha, Nepalese composer
- Shailesh Singh, Indian politician
- Shailesh Thapa Chhetri, Nepalese police officer
- Shailesh Tinaikar, Indian army officer
- Shailesh Vara, Ugandan-British politician
