= J. Chris Leach =

American finance scholar

J. Chris Leach is an American finance scholar and the W.W. Reynolds Capital Markets Program Endowed Chair at the University of Colorado-Boulder

== Education and career ==
Leach graduated from Oral Roberts University in 1981 with a degree in Computer Science. He later graduated with an MBA from the University of New Mexico and a Master's of Science in Management - Economics from Cornell University.

Leach began his faculty career as an assistant professor of finance at the Wharton School at the University of Pennsylvania. Subsequently, Leach joined the Leeds School of Business at the University of Colorado Boulder. He served as Leeds School Senior Associate Dean for Faculty and Research from 2011–2016. He was visiting professor, Indian School of Business, Mohali campus from 2013-2014 and served as Interim Division Chair of Management and Entrepreneurship and the Division Chair of Finance.

Leach was added as a coauthor for the 7th edition of the textbook Entrepreneurial Finance by Philip Adelman and Alan Marks, which applies tools and techniques of corporate finance to the entrepreneurial venture.

Leach leads the De Soto Initiative to develop business curricula that highlight the role of business in society. The initiative is based on the work of Hernando de Soto Polar, who has highlighted the role of property rights in reducing poverty in his home country of Peru and other developing economies. The World of Business course created by Leach and colleagues has been adopted at many other universities. The course uses gamification to introduce students to fundamental issues on the role of business: the role of governments and markets, the rule of law, ethical issues in business, diversity and inclusion, and fundamental economic concepts such as the role of trade and “externalities” of business activities on others in society.
