= Vijay Khatri =

Indian-American academic administrator and professor

Dean of the Leeds School of Business
- Incumbent
- Assumed office July 2023
- Preceded by: Sharon Matusik

Personal details
- Education: University of Arizona (PhD); University of Bombay (MS); Malaviya National Institute of Technology (BS)

Vijay Khatri is an Indian-American academic administrator and professor currently serving as the Tandean Rustandy Endowed Dean of the Leeds School of Business at the University of Colorado Boulder. He took office in July 2023 and holds the first endowed deanship at the university.

== Early life and education ==
Vijay Khatri earned his doctorate in management with a minor in computer science from the University of Arizona, a master's degree in management from the University of Bombay, and a bachelor's degree in engineering from Malaviya National Institute of Technology.

== Career ==
Prior to his appointment at CU Boulder, Khatri was a professor of operations and decision technologies at Indiana University’s Kelley School of Business. He has held various leadership positions at Kelley, including Executive Associate Dean for Strategy, Innovation, and Technology; Associate Dean for Information, Instructional Technologies, and Academics; chairperson of the Department of Operations & Decision Technologies and co-director of the Institute for Business Analytics.

== Research ==
Khatri's research primarily focuses on the information economy, covering aspects such as the design, management, governance, and data analytics of data repositories.

=== Selected publications ===
- Khatri, V.; Brown, C. V. (2010). "Designing data governance". Communications of the ACM. 53 (1): 148–152. doi:10.1145/1629175.1629210.
- Khatri, V.; Vessey, I.; Ramesh, V.; Clay, P.; Park, S. J. (2006). "Understanding conceptual schemas: Exploring the role of application and IS domain knowledge". Information Systems Research. 17 (1): 81–99. doi:10.1287/isre.1060.0081.
- Acito, F.; Khatri, V. (2014). "Business analytics: Why now and what next?". Business Horizons. 57 (5): 565–570. doi:10.1016/j.bushor.2014.05.002.
- Massey, A. P.; Khatri, V.; Montoya-Weiss, M. M. (2007). "Usability of online services: The role of technology readiness and context". Decision Sciences. 38 (2): 277–308. doi:10.1111/j.1540-5915.2007.00159.x.
