= Jan Brzeski =

American businessman

Jan B. Brzeski is the Founder & Managing Director at Sage Credit Investment Partners, LLC, commonly referred to as SCIP, a real estate lender and investment manager based in Durham, NC. SCIP is a private real estate lender specializing in business-purpose bridge, renovation, and construction loans. The firm focuses on issuing sub-$4 million loans to experienced borrowers in North Carolina and California for urban infill and density projects. SCIP offers the flexibility and customization required for these loans that banks and traditional lenders are not able to provide. These loans are then pooled in lower-risk, higher yielding funds for qualified investors.

Before forming SCIP, Brzeski was managing director and Chief Investment Officer of Crosswind Financial and Arixa Capital Advisors, LLC, a private real estate investment advisor in Los Angeles that he founded in 2006. While with Arixa, Brzeski oversaw an organization that funded 1,800 loans totaling more than $3.5 billion from 2010 - 2023; the firm recently announced that it has surpassed $6 billion in loan originations since inception. In 2021, Brzeski was named one of Southern California's Banking and Finance visionaries by the Los Angeles Times. Brzeski holds a B.A. in physics from Dartmouth College and an M.A. in economics (PPE) from Oxford University.

== Career ==
Prior to forming Arixa Capital in 2006, Brzeski was Vice President of Acquisitions at Standard Management Company, a real estate investment and management company founded by Samuel K. Freshman. While at Standard Management, Brzeski's responsibilities included identifying properties to acquire, underwriting, and negotiating to purchase income property and land. Brzeski has purchased properties including shopping centers, industrial projects, agricultural and development land in Los Angeles, Kern, Riverside, San Bernardino, Placer and Yolo Counties in California.

Before joining Standard Management, Brzeski was a successful entrepreneur. He co-founded and was CEO of STV Communications, Inc., a media services businesses that he sold in 2000.

Previously, Brzeski worked at Goldman Sachs as an investment banking analyst where he contributed to initial public offerings, secondary stock and bond offerings, as well as mergers and acquisitions of leading technology companies.

== Other Activities ==
In 2021, Brzeski was named a ‘Banking and Finance Visionary’ by the Los Angeles Times for his work in private real estate lending.

Brzeski has been featured in media outlets such as Reuters, Bloomberg, and Investopedia, and has served as a speaker at national real estate finance conferences.

Mr. Brzeski is the author of the 2010 book, The Common Sense Guide To Real Estate Investing, and numerous articles in real estate trade publications. He is a past moderator and co-organizer of the UCLA Real Estate Conference and several UCLA Anderson School of Management real estate symposium events. He was formerly an instructor for UCLA Extension Real Estate Program. He is a California licensed real estate broker.
