= Matušík =

Matušík (Slovak) or Matusik (Polish) is a surname. Notable people with the surname include:

- Adrián Matušík
- Ivan Matušík
- Jerzy Matusik (born 1962), Polish Brigadier General, sports activist, businessman
- Katarzyna Matusik-Lipiec, Polish politician, M.P.
- Sharon Matusik
- Vieroslav Matušík (1927–1995), Slovak composer, conductor, and bassoonist
