= David Y. Choi =

American professor

- Born: Seoul, South Korea

Academic background
- Education: UC Berkeley (BS, MS); UCLA Anderson (Ph.D.)

David Y. Choi is an American professor and entrepreneur. He holds the Conrad N. Hilton Chair of Entrepreneurship at Loyola Marymount University.

== Early life and education ==
Choi was born in Seoul, South Korea and moved to Germany and then to California when he was in high school. He attended UC Berkeley for Engineering and UCLA Anderson for his Ph.D. in management.

== Career ==
After attending UC Berkeley and UCLA Anderson, Choi worked for The Boston Consulting Group and Harvard Business School where he helped found the Leadership Initiative before getting more involved in entrepreneurial endeavors and teaching at Loyola Marymount University. Choi worked with various food, software, and biotech companies as co-founder, board member, or advisor, and as interim president of two publicly traded firms. At Loyola Marymount University, Choi was the recipient of the Fritz B. Burns President's Distinguished Teaching Award in 2019 and was appointed to Conrad N. Hilton Chair of Entrepreneurship in 2021. He was also the co-director of the Ascend LA Program which offered an effective entrepreneurship training programs for women and people of color. He was a visiting professor at Peking University, Korea Advanced Institute of Science and Technology, and Korea University.

He is a co-author of Values-Centered Entrepreneurs and Their Businesses published by Taylor Francis in 2010.

== Honors ==
Choi was the recipient of the Fritz B. Burns President's Distinguished Teaching Award in 2019, and was appointed to Conrad N. Hilton Chair of Entrepreneurship in 2021. Choi is the recipient of the Innovative Pedagogy Award for Entrepreneurship from the United States Association of Small Business and Entrepreneurship.
