= Antonio Bernardo (neurosurgeon) =

Italian-American neurosurgeon

Antonio Bernardo, MD
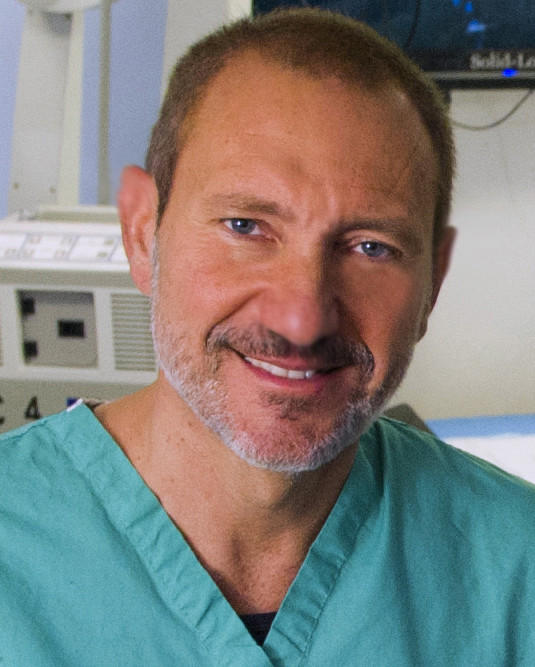
- Antonio Bernardo, MD
- Education: University of Naples Federico II
- Known for: Neurosurgery and Neuroscience
- Scientific career
- Fields: Neurosurgery
- Workplaces: Barrow Neurological Institute; Weill Medical College; NewYork–Presbyterian Hospital

Antonio Bernardo is an Italian-American neurosurgeon and academic physician. He is a professor of Neurological Surgery and the Director of the Neurosurgical Innovations and Training Center for Skull Base and Microneurosurgery in the Department of Neurological Surgery at Weill Cornell Medical College. He has gained significant notoriety for his expertise in skull base and cerebrovascular surgery, and has published extensively on minimally invasive neurosurgery. He is a pioneer in the use of 3D technology in neurosurgery and a strong advocate for competency-based training in surgery.

== Early life and education ==
Bernardo was born and raised in Naples, Italy. Bernardo earned his medical degree from the University of Naples Federico II in 1990 and completed residency training in neurosurgery at The Western General Hospital in Edinburgh, Scotland, which is part of NHS Lothian. During his residency, he worked extensively on the epidemiology and treatment of head injury and hemorrhagic stroke with Douglas Miller.

Following residency he trained in skull base and cerebrovascular surgery at the University of California, Irvine from 1997 to 1999 and subsequently completed fellowship training in Skull Base Surgery at the Barrow Neurological Institute, under the mentorship of Robert Spetzler.

== Professional career ==
Following his time at the University of California, Irvine, Bernardo moved to Peru in 1999 and joined the Foundation for International Education in Neurological Surgery (FIENS) as part of an effort to establish skull base surgery programs in hospitals throughout the country.

In 2000, Bernardo joined the neurosurgery faculty of the University of Medicine and Dentistry of New Jersey, where he was also the co-director of their Microneurosurgery Skull Base Laboratory.

Following completion of his fellowship at the Barrow Neurological Institute, he joined the Faculty of Weill Cornell Medical College in 2004 where he is currently a Professor of Neurosurgery and the Director of the Neurosurgical Innovations and Training Center for Skull Base and Microneurosurgery.

In 2011, Bernardo founded the Weill Cornell Neurosurgical Innovations and Training Center, a research and training facility for neurosurgeons, where he and his longstanding collaborator, fellow neurosurgeon Dr. Alexander I. Evins, direct a fellowship training program in skull base and microneurosurgery. As of 2025, the program has trained over 200 neurosurgeons from 57 countries and is regarded as one of the premier international training programs in skull base neurosurgery.

The research laboratory, under the direction of Bernardo and Evins, works on the development of new operative techniques in neurosurgery as well as the integration of neurosurgery with novel technologies. Bernardo's current areas of research include minimally invasive neurosurgery, surgical simulation and planning, surgical robotics, flexible endoscopy, flexible surgical instrumentation, white matter navigation, 3D printing, virtual and augmented reality, and the development of novel operative techniques in microneurosurgery.

Bernardo currently practices neurosurgery in multiple countries where he exclusively operates on complex skull base and cerebrovascular surgical cases.

== Humanitarian work ==
Bernardo has been a vocal proponent for the advancement of neurosurgical education in developing countries and has provided educational opportunities for surgeons from around the world through courses and his fellowship program. Since 1999, he has regularly volunteered his time for surgery and to teach surgeons in a number of developing countries in Latin America.

== Awards ==
- 1994, Bruel & Kijel Travelling Fellowship Award from the Department of Neurosurgery at the Righospitalet in Copenhagen, Denmark
- 1999, Excellence in Clinical Teaching Award from the Hospital G. Almenara
- 2000, Excellence in Clinical Teaching Award from the Hospital Rebagliati
- 2001, Lou Grubb Fellowship in Skull Base Anatomy, Barrow Neurological Institute
- 2002, Annual Clinical Excellence Award from Medtronic
- 2002, Best Scientific Paper, Annual Meeting of the Caribbean Association of Neurological Surgeons
- 2003, Honored Guest at the Annual Meeting of the Colombian Association of Otolaryngology, Head and Neck Surgery, and Maxillo-Facial Surgery
- 2004, Award for Excellence in Surgery and Teaching from the University of Guadalajara, Mexico
- 2004, Honored guest at the Annual Meeting of the Colombian Association of Neurological Surgeons
- 2006, Gold Medal from the Venezuelan Congress of Neurological Surgeons for his contribution to the development of Neurosurgery in Venezuela
- 2008, Gold medal from the Latin American Federation of Neurological Surgeons for his contribution to the development of Neurosurgery in Latin America
- 2015, Friendship Award from the Gruppo Esponenti Italiani
- 2015, Honorary Member of the Italian Association of Neurological Surgeons
- 2015, Honored Guest at the Annual Meeting of the Italian Association of Neurological Surgeons
- 2016, Grand Award of Merit, American Society of the Italian Legions of Merit
- 2017, Cavaliere of the Order of Merit of the Italian Republic

== Selected publications ==
=== Books ===
- Bernardo A, Evins AI, Complex Surgical Approaches to the Skull Base: A Dissection Manual, New York, NY: NTG Press; 2024. ISBN 979-8218117252
- Bernardo A, Evins AI, Skull Base Surgery: A Contemporary Guide to Operative Techniques, New York, NY: Thieme. 2026.

=== Book chapters ===
- Bernardo A, Stieg PE, Orbitocranial Zygomatic Approach for Upper Basilar Artery Aneurysms, Chapter 11 in: Mcdonald RL, Neurosurgical Operative Atlas: Vascular Neurosurgery, 2nd ed., New York, NY: Thieme Verlagsgruppe, 2009. ISBN 978-1-604-06034-8
- Bernardo A, Stieg PE, Translabyrinthine and Transcochlear Petrosal Approaches, Chapter 12 in: Cappabianca P, Califano L, Iaconetta G, (eds.) Cranial, Craniofacial and Skull Base Surgery, Milan, Italy: Springer-Verlag Mailand; 2010. ISBN 978-88-470-1167-0
- Bernardo A, Evins AI, Neurosurgical Anatomy and Approaches to Simulation in Neurosurgical Training, in: Alaraj A, ed. Comprehensive Healthcare Simulation: Neurosurgery Edition, New York, NY: Springer; 2018. ISBN 978-3-319-75582-3
- Bernardo A, Anatomy and Histology of Intracranial AVMs, in: Steig PE, Khalessi A, Apuzzo MLJ eds. Intracranial Arteriovenous Malformations: Essentials for Patients and Practitioners, New York, NY: Elsevier; 2023. ISBN 978-0323825306

=== Research articles ===
- Ammirati, M; Bernardo, A (1998). "Analytical evaluation of complex anterior approaches to the cranial base: an anatomic study". Neurosurgery. 43 (6): 1398–407, discussion 1407-8. doi:10.1227/00006123-199812000-00081. PMID 9848854..
- Bernardo, A; Preul, MC; Zabramski, JM; Spetzler, RF (2003). "A three-dimensional interactive virtual dissection model to simulate transpetrous surgical avenues". Neurosurgery. 52 (3): 499–505, discussion 504-5. doi:10.1227/01.neu.0000047813.32607.68. PMID 12590673. S2CID 10780611..
- Bernardo, A; Evins, AI; Visca, A; Stieg, PE (2013). "The intracranial facial nerve as seen through different surgical windows: an extensive anatomosurgical study". Neurosurgery. 72 (2 Suppl Operative): ons194-207, discussion ons207. doi:10.1227/NEU.0b013e31827e5844. PMID 23190637. S2CID 28602638..
- Alaraj, A; Luciano, CJ; Bailey, DP; Elsenousi, A; Roitberg, BZ; Bernardo, A; Banerjee, PP; Charbel, FT (2015). "Virtual reality cerebral aneurysm clipping simulation with real-time haptic feedback". Neurosurgery. 11 Suppl 2 (2): 52–8. doi:10.1227/NEU.0000000000000583. PMC 4340784. PMID 25599200..
- Shoakazemi, A; Evins, AI; Burrell, JC; Stieg, PE; Bernardo, A (2015). "A 3D endoscopic transtubular transcallosal approach to the third ventricle". J Neurosurg. 122 (3): 564–73. doi:10.3171/2014.11.JNS14341. PMID 25555026..
- Bernardo, A; Evins, AI; Tsiouris, AJ; Stieg, PE (2015). "A Percutaneous Transtubular Middle Fossa Approach for Intracanalicular Tumors". World Neurosurg. 84 (1): 132–46. doi:10.1016/j.wneu.2015.02.042. PMID 25771211..
- Bernardo, A (2017). "The Changing Face of Technologically Integrated Neurosurgery: Today's High-Tech Operating Room". World Neurosurg. 106: 1001–1014. doi:10.1016/j.wneu.2017.06.159. PMID 28985655. S2CID 8581519..
- Bernardo, A (2017). "Virtual Reality and Simulation in Neurosurgical Training". World Neurosurg. 106: 1015–1029. doi:10.1016/j.wneu.2017.06.140. PMID 28985656..
- Bernardo, A (2017). "Establishment of Next-Generation Neurosurgery Research and Training Laboratory with Integrated Human Performance Monitoring". World Neurosurg. 106: 991–1000. doi:10.1016/j.wneu.2017.06.160. PMID 28985669..
