= Antonio Bernardo (academic administrator) =

American college dean and finance professor

Dean of the UCLA Anderson School of Management
- In office July 1, 2019 – June 30, 2025
- Preceded by: Judy D. Olian
- Succeeded by: Margaret Shih (interim)

Personal details
- Education: University of Western Ontario (BS); Stanford University (PhD)

Antonio Bernardo is an American academic administrator and finance professor who served as the ninth dean of the UCLA Anderson School of Management from July 1, 2019, to June 30, 2025. Bernardo has been a member of the UCLA Anderson finance faculty since 1994 and has held various academic and administrative roles at the school.

== Early life and education ==
Bernardo completed his bachelor's degree in economics at the University of Western Ontario and later earned a doctorate in economics from Stanford University.

== Career ==
Bernardo began his career in academia at UCLA Anderson and has been part of its finance faculty since 1994. He has held various positions at the school, including the Joel Fried Chair in Applied Finance and the Robert D. Beyer Term Chair in Management. His administrative roles at UCLA Anderson have included serving as department chair, senior associate dean for academic affairs from 2006 to 2009, and finance area chair from 2013 to 2015 and again in 2019.

During his tenure as senior associate dean, he helped launch the school's Master of Financial Engineering program.

Bernardo was appointed dean of the UCLA Anderson School of Management in July 2019.

Bernardo stepped down as dean in June 2025 after serving in the role for six years. Margaret Shih became interim dean effective July 1, 2025.

On July 1, 2026, Gareth M. James became the 10th dean of the UCLA Anderson School of Management and the John E. Anderson Chair in Management. James joined UCLA from Emory University's Goizueta Business School, where he had served as the John H. Harland Dean since 2022.

== Research ==
Bernardo is known for his expertise in corporate finance, information in financial markets, and asset valuation. He has contributed articles to leading finance, economics, and law journals, and has served as an associate editor for several academic publications.

== Gordon Klein Controversy ==
On June 2, 2020, a UCLA student, Leslie Giovanny, sent an email to Professor Gordon Klein of the UCLA Anderson School of Management, requesting race-based preferential treatment in the administration of his final exam. In reference to the Black Lives Matter protests, Giovanny asked for compassion and leniency towards Black students, given they were being placed at an unfair academic disadvantage due to traumatic circumstances out of their control.

The response email from Professor Klein contained a list of questions related to the practical implementations of this proposal including how to treat mixed parentage students, or students from Minneapolis where the protests were more intense than elsewhere. In his response, Klein referenced Martin Luther King’s vision of a colorblind society, and communicated that students would not be treated differently on the basis of their skin color. Giovanny sent one final email apologizing to Klein and thanking him for being helpful to students during the COVID-19 lockdowns.

Portions of the response from Klein were posted on social media and triggered a series of events, including death threats aimed at Klein on voicemail and email, antisemitic insults, and a petition demanding Klein be fired that garnered over 21,000 signatures.

On June 3, 2020 Bernardo, in his role as Dean of the UCLA Anderson School of Management, suspended and banned Klein from UCLA for a period of three weeks due to allegations regarding his behavior. Klein was warned not to engage in retaliation. Related announcements were circulated via email to UCLA Anderson students, alumni, faculty, and administrators on June 4, 2020.

Without mentioning Klein by name, Bernardo announced that "troubling behavior" by a lecturer had been reported to “all appropriate UCLA investigative offices.” His conduct was referenced as demonstrating "a disregard for our core principles" and "an abuse of power." Bernardo apologized for the "increased pain and anger" experienced by the community and announced that the lecturer in question was currently on leave, his courses having been reassigned.

The controversy was widely shared online with several groups supporting Klein, others demanding his resignation.

Klein was eventually reinstated as a UCLA instructor. The UCLA Senate Committee on Academic Freedom upheld his rights to express his views on his grading policy and to deny requests such as the one put forward by Giovanny. UCLA's Discrimination Prevention Office formally exonerated Klein of wrongdoing on July 22, 2020.

Klein however claims that, due to this incident, most firms that had previously retained him as an expert witness have chosen not to further conduct business with him. He further claims that as a result he lost almost all his non-teaching income, which amounted to $1.9 million in 2019.

On September 27, 2021, Klein sued Bernardo and the Regents of the University of California. The lawsuit alleges that UCLA violated his right to privacy, breached his employment contract, and that Bernardo's behavior amounted to retaliatory discrimination. It is also alleged that the university published misleading or incorrect private information about Klein. Klein is seeking $22 million in damages for lost income and emotional distress. Trial commenced on June 30, 2025.

=== Selected publications ===
- Allen, F.; Bernardo, A. E.; Welch, I. (2000). "A theory of dividends based on tax clienteles". The Journal of Finance. 55 (6): 2499–2536. doi:10.1111/0022-1082.00298.
- Bernardo, A. E.; Welch, I. (2001). "On the evolution of overconfidence and entrepreneurs". Journal of Economics & Management Strategy. 10 (3): 301–330. doi:10.1111/j.1430-9134.2001.00301.x. S2CID 157136662.
- Bernardo, A. E.; Ledoit, O. (2000). "Gain, loss, and asset pricing". Journal of Political Economy. 108 (1): 144–172. doi:10.1086/262114. S2CID 16854983.
- Bernardo, A. E.; Welch, I. (2004). "Liquidity and financial market runs". The Quarterly Journal of Economics. 119 (1): 135–158. doi:10.1162/003355304772839542. S2CID 15750724.

== Awards ==
Bernardo has received accolades such as the LaForce Award for Outstanding Leadership, the Dean's Award for Outstanding Contributions to the Doctoral Program, the George W. Robbins Award for Teaching Excellence, and several others. His teaching experience extends beyond UCLA, with appointments at Fudan University in Shanghai, the Indian School of Business in Hyderabad, and a visiting position at the University of Chicago.
