= Robert J. Dolan =

Robert J. Dolan is currently the Baker Foundation Professor at Harvard Business School. From 2001 to 2012, he was the dean of the Ross School of Business at the University of Michigan. His specialty is marketing.

Dolan graduated from Boston College in 1969 and earned his PhD from the University of Rochester in 1977. From 1976 to 1980 he was a faculty member at the University of Chicago, then moved to Harvard University, where he was a faculty member and administrator at Harvard Business School for 21 years. In 2001, when he was the Edward W. Carter Professor of Business Administration, he was appointed to head the Ross School of Business at the University of Michigan. He was Stephen M. Ross Professor and Edward J. Frey Dean there until 2012, when he returned to Harvard. He was named professor emeritus and dean emeritus at Michigan.

Dolan's major research interests are product policy and pricing.
