= Scott DeRue =

American academic (born 1977)

- Born: June 26, 1977 (age 49); Milledgeville, Georgia, U.S.
- Education: University of North Carolina at Chapel Hill; Michigan State University's Eli Broad College of Business
- Occupations: Dean and Professor
- Employer: University of Michigan
- Known for: Dean of the Ross School of Business
- Spouse: Kathy DeRue

Scott DeRue (born June 26, 1977) is a business professor, academic leader, investor, board member, and adventurer. From 2016 until 2022 he was the Edward J. Frey Dean of the Ross School of Business at the University of Michigan. Since 2024 DeRue has been CEO of the World Triathlon Corporation a sports events company that stages Ironman triathlon branded races.

== Early life ==
Scott DeRue was born June 26, 1977, in Milledgeville, Georgia. He graduated from the University of North Carolina at Chapel Hill, where he earned a bachelor of science with honors in business administration. He also earned a PhD in management and organizational behavior from the Eli Broad College of Business at Michigan State University.

== Career ==
DeRue began his career at the Monitor Group, now known as Monitor Deloitte. He started in Monitor Group's private equity business, called Monitor-Clipper Partners. He then was a management consultant focusing on corporate and innovation strategy for both public companies, private enterprises, and nonprofits. After leaving the Monitor Group, DeRue worked as a marketing executive for Hinckley Yachts, a luxury yacht builder." In 2007, DeRue began his career in academia at the Ross School of Business at the University of Michigan as an assistant professor of management. He directed the school's Emerging Leaders Program, founded the Sanger Leadership Center, and taught leadership courses for undergraduates, MBAs, and executives. In 2013, DeRue was promoted to full professor. In 2014, he was promoted to Associate Dean, and in 2015, he was named the Gilbert and Ruth Whitaker Professor of Business Administration. In 2016 he became the Stephen M. Ross Professor of Business and the Edward J. Frey Dean of the Ross School of Business at the University of Michigan in Ann Arbor, Michigan, U.S. On Friday, 9 Apr 2021, The Michigan Daily reported that he announced plans to step down from his position on 23 May 2021 to take on a new role as a senior executive in the private sector.

In September 2016, DeRue succeeded Alison Davis-Blake as the dean of the Ross School of Business, becoming the youngest dean of a top business school. DeRue is an expert on leadership and high-performing teams, and is known for leading innovations in higher education. Under his leadership, the Ross School of Business has achieved some of its highest rankings in school history, been recognized among the top business schools globally for research productivity, won awards for diversity and social impact, completed a $400m fundraising campaign, and became the first top-ranked business school to launch an online MBA program. In 2017, he compared his vision for online education to services like Spotify, and talked about how universities should stream education to people around the world in order to serve students that need and want a world-class education but cannot come to campus.

DeRue is the co-author of a book on leadership development, and has authored or co-authored many articles on leadership and teamwork. He was co-author of a popular blog on leadership for The Washington Post, has written for Harvard Business Review, and published many articles in academic journals such as the Academy of Management Review, the Academy of Management Journal, and the Journal of Applied Psychology. DeRue is a managing partner of ChiBor Angels, an angel investment firm. He is also a managing partner of Rabun Group, a small private equity firm.

On January 29, 2024, DeRue was appointed as the CEO of the World Triathlon Corporation, a sports event promotion company that produces races such as the Ironman triathlon and the Ironman 70.3.

== Board service ==
DeRue serves on corporate and nonprofit boards.

- Chairperson and board member, William Davidson Institute
- Board member, Equinox Group
- Trustee, The Conference Board
- Board member, Ann Arbor Sports Commission

== Books and articles ==
- DeRue, Scott; McCauley, Cynthia; Taylor, Sylvester; Yost, Paul (2013). Experience-Driven Leader Development: Models, Tools, Best Practices, and Advice for On-the-Job Development. New York: Jossey-Bass/Wiley. ISBN 9781118458075. OCLC 941213149.

== Mountaineering ==
DeRue is an avid mountaineer who has successfully summited some of the world's tallest mountains, including Mount Everest in 2013.

- Kilimanjaro (2007, 2018)
- Shuksan (2008)
- Rainier (2008)
- Aconcagua (2010)
- Denali (2011)
- Everest (2013)
- Vinson (2019)
- Elbrus (2019)

In addition to mountaineering, DeRue is a long-distance runner who tested shoes for Runner's World magazine.

== Personal life ==
DeRue is married to Kathy DeRue.
