= Rachna Dhingra =

Indian politician

- Born: 3 September 1977 (age 49); Delhi, India
- Education: University of Michigan (B.B.A.)
- Occupations: Social activist, Politician
- Employer(s): JSTOR, Accenture
- Political party: Aam Aadmi Party
- Awards: India Today Woman Award, 2011

Rachna Dhingra (born 3 September 1977) is a social activist working in Bhopal with the survivors of the Bhopal gas tragedy, a gas leak from a Union Carbide plant in 1984 that has killed 20,000 people. She is also currently a member of the Aam Aadmi Party of India.

== Early life and education ==
Rachna Dhingra, the only child of her parents, was born in Delhi. Her parents divorced when she was 3 months old. Her mother was a single parent since then, until she moved to USA to remarry in 1992. Rachna was 18 at this time. Rachna did her undergraduate in business administration from Ross School of Business at University of Michigan, Ann Arbor in the United States. After graduating, she joined Accenture as a Business Consultant. In the year 2002 she resigned from her job and in January 2003, Rachna came to Bhopal to work in support of the Bhopal survivors’ struggle for justice.

== Social work ==
During her time at the University of Michigan, Rachna joined a student group called the Association for India's Development, Ann Arbor, that was already working for the welfare of the survivors of the Bhopal disaster. In Ann Arbor, Rachna along with other AID volunteers set up the Bhopal Action Network to support not just the cause of the Bhopal survivors, but the survivors from other chemical disasters over the world. Rachna is now actively involved in the campaign for the Bhopal survivors through the Bhopal Group of Information and Action. Her goal is to get the appropriate compensation to survivors, initiating efforts for clean drinking water, generating employment, and mobilizing local and global communities. She was part of relief efforts for 2001 Gujarat earthquake and 2002 Gujarat riots.

=== Bhopal gas tragedy: struggle for justice ===
As a member of the Bhopal Group for Information and Action for the last 10 years, Rachna has taken part in legal actions, protest demonstrations and media presentations on issues of the disaster in Bhopal locally, nationally and internationally. Rachna has walked from Bhopal to New Delhi in 2006 and again in 2008 along with survivors of the disaster and their supporters. In 2007 along with others fasted for 19 days and then again in 2008 when she continued with her fast while in Tihar jail for 10 days. In 2009 along with survivors and supporters she travelled through Europe and the United States campaigning against the U.S. based corporations responsible for the Bhopal disaster at public gatherings in Germany, Italy, Netherlands, and a dozen U.S. cities. She has been a keen and effective RTI activist for the last 8 years. Rachna was awarded the women of the year in the category of public service by the India Today magazine in 2010.

== Political career ==
Rachna is a member of the Aam Aadmi Party and contested the Lok Sabha election in 2014 from Bhopal, Madhya Pradesh. She was one of the 28 candidates of the party who contested from Madhya Pradesh.

== Awards ==
On 14 January 2011, Rachna Dhingra received the India Today woman of the year award in Public Service category from Mariane Pearl and India Today Group chairman and editor-in-chief Aroon Purie for giving up a promising career and moving to Bhopal to campaign for justice for the victims of the gas tragedy and the affected families.

She also received the international ethecon Blue Planet Award 2019 on 23 November 2019 in Berlin, germany, honoring her courage in confronting corporate crime.
