= John V. Faraci =

American businessman

John V. Faraci is an American businessman. He served as the chairman and chief executive officer of International Paper from November 1, 2003, through October 31, 2014. He was succeeded by Mark Sutton.

== Biography ==
=== Early life ===
He attended Denison University, where he was a member of the Lambda Chi Alpha fraternity, and received an M.B.A. from the University of Michigan's Ross School of Business.

=== Career ===
From 1995 to 1999, he was CEO and managing director of Carter Holt Harvey Ltd., a former majority-owned subsidiary of International Paper located in New Zealand. In 1999, he became senior vice president of finance and chief financial officer of International Paper. In 2003, he became chairman and CEO. In September 2009, CNNMoney listed Faraci as number four on a list of the five most overpaid CEOs. The story noted his total compensation was over $38 million during a period when his company lost 63% of its value. He sits on the Boards of Directors of PPG Industries, United Technologies Corporation, U.S. Steel, and the Citigroup International Advisory Board.

He sits on the Board of Trustees of his alma mater, Denison University, and the American Enterprise Institute. He also serves as a member of the boards of the Grand Teton National Park Foundation and the National Park Foundation. In January 2020, he was appointed as the executive chairman for Carrier.

=== Personal life ===
He is married, and has two children. They live in Memphis, Tennessee.
