= Alison Davis-Blake =

American academic administrator

8th President of Bentley University
- In office July 1, 2018 – June 2020
- Preceded by: Gloria Cordes Larson
- Succeeded by: E. LaBrent Chrite

Personal details
- Born: November 5, 1958 (age 67) Palo Alto, California
- Education: Brigham Young University; Stanford University

Alison Davis-Blake (born November 5, 1958) is an American academic administrator. She served as the eighth president of Bentley University. Before Bentley, she served as dean of the Carlson School of Management at the University of Minnesota and of the Ross School of Business at the University of Michigan. At Ross, Davis-Blake was the school’s first female dean, and at the time of her appointment she was the highest-ranking female dean at any U.S. business school.

== Early life ==
Davis-Blake was born on November 5, 1958, in Palo Alto, California. She grew up in the Minneapolis–Saint Paul area of Minnesota. Her father was a professor of information systems at the University of Minnesota.

Davis-Blake received her B.S. in Economics (summa cum laude and with highest (University) honors) in 1979 from Brigham Young University. After working at Touche Ross, she earned a M.O.B. from the University's Marriott School of Management in 1982. In 1986, she received a Ph.D. in Organizational Behavior from Stanford University.

== Career ==
In 1990, Davis-Blake was hired by the McCombs School of Business at the University of Texas at Austin as an associate professor. She was promoted to Chair of the Management Department, and in 2003 became the Senior Associate Dean for Academic Affairs.

In 2006, Davis-Blake was appointed as Dean of the Carlson School of Management at the University of Minnesota where she remained through June 2011.

On February 14, 2011, it was announced that Davis-Blake would become the new Dean of the Ross School of Business at the University of Michigan, succeeding Robert J. Dolan. Davis-Blake served as Dean from July 1, 2011, to July 1, 2016. She was succeeded by Scott DeRue.

On July 1, 2018, Davis-Blake became Bentley University's eighth President and its second female President after Gloria Cordes Larson. She stepped down in June, 2020. Davis-Blake's academic service included editor positions with both the Academy of Management Review and Administrative Science Quarterly.

== Personal life ==
Davis-Blake is married, and has two sons. She is a member of the Church of Jesus Christ of Latter-day Saints.
