= Gloria Cordes Larson =

American lawyer, public policy expert, and business leader

Gloria Larson

7th President of Bentley University
- In office July 1, 2007 – June 30, 2018
- Preceded by: Joseph Morone
- Succeeded by: Alison Davis-Blake

Personal details
- Party: Republican
- Spouse: Allen Larson
- Education: Vassar College (AB); University of Virginia (JD)

Gloria Cordes Larson is a prominent lawyer, public policy expert, and business leader. Larson was named president of Bentley University in 2007 and served in that role until June 2018. She was the seventh president of Bentley and the first woman to hold the post. Prior to joining Bentley, Larson served as secretary of consumer affairs and business regulation from 1991 to 1993, under former Massachusetts Governor William Weld and led a business advisory council for former Massachusetts Governor Deval Patrick.

Larson is a board member of the Unum Group and Boston Private Financial Holdings.

== Early life and career ==
Larson attended McLean High School in McLean, Virginia. She received her bachelor of arts with honors from Vassar College and earned her juris doctor from the University of Virginia School of Law. She received an honorary doctorate of laws from Northeastern University in 2005 and from Mount Wachusett Community College in 2003.

She is married to Allen Larson, an attorney. They own three Labrador retrievers, Harry Jr., Sally and Teak.

From 1981 to 1988, Larson oversaw business and regulatory issues for the Federal Trade Commission as an attorney advisor to FTC Commissioner Patricia Bailey. She served as the deputy director of Consumer Protection at the FTC from 1990 to 1991. As deputy director, Larson's work included establishing national consumer protection policies and implementing law enforcement and educational efforts.

== Weld administration ==
Larson joined the administration of Massachusetts Governor William Weld in 1991. She was Secretary of Consumer Affairs and Business Regulation from 1991 to 1993 where she was responsible for banking, insurance and energy, as well as consumer protection. From 1993 to 1996 Larson helped lead the Commonwealth through an era of strong economic growth as Secretary of Economic Affairs. She was responsible for developing and promoting economic growth policies and fostering employment opportunities for the Commonwealth of Massachusetts.

== Law career ==
Following her career in state government, Larson joined Foley Hoag LLP and was the co-chair of the Government Strategies Group. Her team managed a practice that covered a broad array of federal, state and local regulatory and business development issues, including real estate development, energy, insurance, environmental permitting, transportation, advertising and internet privacy matters.

She is a member of the Bar in Massachusetts and Virginia.

== Convention Center ==
Larson served as the chairman of the board of the Massachusetts Convention Center Authority (MCCA) from 1999 to 2010. Under her leadership, the organization oversaw the renovation of the MassMutual Center in Springfield and the $800 million construction of the Boston Convention and Exhibition Center, which opened in June 2004 in Boston's waterfront district.

== Patrick administration ==
In 2006 Larson supported Deval Patrick for Massachusetts Governor. After his victory, she served as co-chair of his transition team. Through Patrick's two terms, Larson advised the administration in a variety of business-related roles, including leading the Governor's Council of Economic Advisors. Larson also served as co-chair of Patrick's Finance Commission for his education reform proposal, the Readiness Project, charged with recommending revenue sources to fund the project. In 2014 Larson served on Patrick's 2014 Successful Women, Successful Families Task Force.

== Other roles and positions ==
Larson was the first woman to serve as chairman of the board of the Greater Boston Chamber of Commerce and continues to serve on the chamber's executive committee.

She is an advocate for education and job creation, and co-chaired the board of the non-partisan think tank MassINC; co-chair of the Great Schools Campaign, a school reform partnership managed by the Mass Insight Education and Research Institute; and served a role in Global Massachusetts 2015, a multi-year leadership initiative to create a vision for economic success in key and emerging industry sectors over the next decade.

Larson was appointed by then-Governor Mitt Romney in January 2005 to the Rose Fitzgerald Kennedy Greenway Conservancy Board, where she served as vice chair of the board until October 2012. She was also chosen by Mayor Thomas Menino in 2004 to serve on the Boston Host Committee for the Democratic National Convention, and was appointed by Governor-Elect Mitt Romney in November 2002 to chair his Transportation and Housing Transition Team.

Larson serves as a director on the board of Unum Group and as a director of Boston Private Financial Holdings Inc. Larson served on the executive committee for the Boston 2024 Partnership, the non-profit organization that attempted to bring the 2024 Summer Olympic and Paralympic Games to Boston, and co-chaired the group's College and University Engagement Committee. She also previously served as a director on the boards of KeySpan Energy and RSA Security before the companies were acquired by National Grid and EMC, respectively. She also served on the board of Blue Cross Blue Shield of Massachusetts.

Larson presently holds the post of president of the Massachusetts Conference for Women and is the past president of the Massachusetts' Women's Forum. In addition, she is a board or advisory council member of several prominent professional, charitable and civic organizations including Roger Williams University School of Law, the Massachusetts High Technology Council, University of Massachusetts Center for Collaborative Leadership and Rosie's Place.

== Bentley University ==
In 2007 Larson was named president of Bentley University by the board of trustees. Larson was drawn to the school because of its approach to redefining business education—by infusing a business curriculum with the arts and sciences. During Larson's tenure, the former Bentley College became a university and established a number of new programs focused on the value of a business education.

At the undergraduate level, the school expanded its commitment to a "fused" curriculum with double majors in business and the liberal arts, as well as new courses co-taught by business and arts and sciences faculty. One of its most recent innovations, the Bentley MBA, is an 11-month global program where students pursue four 10-week modules in a collaborative, studio-based setting.

Larson also launched the Center for Women and Business at Bentley in 2011 committed to advancing shared leadership among women and men in the corporate world and developing women business leaders. A nationally recognized university leader, Larson is a member of the Executive Committee of the American College and University Presidents Climate Commitment and a member of the Liberal Education and America's Promise (LEAP) Presidents' Trust.

Larson stepped down as president of Bentley in June 2018.

== Honors and awards ==
- 2017 Rainbow Luncheon Award
- Associated Industries of Massachusetts "Next Century" Award (2015)
- International Women's Forum "Women Who Make a Difference" Award (2015)
- Boston Magazine's "50 Most Powerful People" (2015)
- Boston Business Journal "Power 50: Influential Bostonians" (2012, 2014, 2015)
- Girl Scouts of Eastern Massachusetts Leading Women Award (2010)
- Greater Boston Chamber of Commerce inaugural recipient of the Collaborative Leadership Award (2009)
- Lawyer of the Year, Massachusetts Lawyer's Weekly and Massachusetts Bar Association (2006)
- The Academy of Distinguished Bostonians Award from the Greater Boston Chamber of Commerce
- The Engineering Center Leadership Award (2004)
- Number one on the list of "100 Most Powerful Women in Boston" in Boston Magazine in 2003
- The Norman S. Rabb Human Relations Award, American Jewish Committee
- The Pinnacle Award from the Greater Boston Chamber of Commerce
- The Abigail Adams Award from the Massachusetts Women's Political Caucus
- The International Business Leader Award from the International Management Development Association
- The New England Council Outstanding Women Business Leaders Award
