= FinancialAccess@Birth =

FinancialAccess@Birth is an economic concept developed by Bhagwan Chowdhry of the UCLA Anderson School of Management. In his program each newborn would be given $100 into an interest bearing account.
