= Shailesh Kumar =

Shailesh Kumar may refer to:

- Shailesh Kumar (politician) (born 1963), Indian politician
- Shailesh Kumar (businessman), American businessman
- Shailesh Kumar Mandal (fl. 2014–2019), Indian politician
- Shailesh Kumar (para-athlete) (born 2000), Indian para high jumper
