= Douglas A. Shackelford =

American professor

- Education: University of North Carolina at Chapel Hill; University of Michigan's Ross School of Business
- Occupations: professor, academic administrator
- Known for: Former Dean of the Kenan–Flagler Business School

Douglas A. Shackelford is an American professor and academic administrator. He served as the dean of the Kenan–Flagler Business School at the University of North Carolina at Chapel Hill until September of 2022, where he is also the Meade H. Willis Distinguished Professor of Taxation.

== Early life ==
Douglas A. Shackelford was born in North Carolina. He graduated from the University of North Carolina at Chapel Hill in 1980 and earned a PhD in Business Administration from the Ross School of Business at the University of Michigan in 1990.

== Career ==
Shackelford began his career as a consultant for Arthur Andersen from 1981 to 1985. He joined his alma mater in 1990, where he was an assistant professor until 1996, and he was a tenured associated professor until 1999. He was a Professor and Andersen Distinguished Tax Scholar from 1999 to 2002, when he was promoted as the Meade H. Willis Distinguished Professor of Taxation. He was the senior associate dean for academic affairs from 2003 to 2007. Shackelford was a visiting professor at the University of Oxford's Saïd Business School in 2011. He is a research associate of the National Bureau of Economic Research. Finally, Shackelford founded the UNC Tax Center UNC Tax Center, a center dedicating to the study of taxation at the Kenan–Flagler Business School.

Shackelford is an expert on taxation. He testified before the United States House Committee on Ways and Means in 2003 and 2006, and before the United States Senate Committee on Finance in 2008. He has published academic articles in journals like the Journal of Accounting and Economics, The Accounting Review, The Journal of Finance, the Journal of Investment Management, the Journal of Accounting Research, and the Journal of Public Economics.

Shackelford became the dean of the Kenan–Flagler Business School at UNC Chapel Hill in February 2014. Under his leadership, he has aimed to teach both hard and soft skills to students, and expand online education to reach out students in Africa and in the military. He resigned September 16, 2022.
