= Sharon Matusik =

US business academic

Sharon F. Matusik

Academic background
- Education: Colby College (AB); University of Washington (PhD)
- Thesis: Ephemeral resources and firm knowledge: The case of the contingent workforce (1998)

Academic work
- Institutions: Rice University; University of Colorado Boulder; University of Michigan

Sharon F. Matusik is an American business strategy scholar and academic administrator. She is the dean of the University of Michigan's Ross School of Business.

Her research focuses on strategy, innovation, entrepreneurship, and how firm knowledge assets and innovation capabilities contribute to competitive advantage.

== Education ==
Matusik graduated with honors from Colby College in 1986, earning a Bachelor of Arts with majors in economics and English. In 1998, she received a Doctor of Philosophy in business administration with a concentration on strategic management from the University of Washington.

== Career ==
Matusik began her academic career in 1998 as an assistant professor at Rice University's Jones Graduate School of Business. In 2004, she moved to the Leeds School of Business at the University of Colorado Boulder. During her tenure at CU Boulder, she served as academic research director of the Deming Center for Entrepreneurship. In 2016, Matusik was named senior associate dean for Faculty and Research, and was appointed interim dean (January, 2017) and dean (May, 2017) at the Leeds School of Business of the University of Colorado Boulder.

In August 2022, Matusik was appointed Edward J. Frey Dean of Business and the Stephen M. Ross Professor of Business at the University of Michigan's Ross School of Business.

== Research ==
Matusik and Hill examined the role of "contingent workers" in knowledge flows that affect competitive advantage of a firm – temporary employees, independent contractors; workers at outsourcing firms, contract workers on-site at a firm, consultants, etc. Reliance on contingent workers can stimulate information flows inside a firm by causing firms to codify of tacit knowledge inside the firm, but also puts the firm at risk of having its special expertise appropriated. Matusik has also studied entrepreneurship and the entrepreneurial ecosystem, such as the role of “offensive” and “defensive” patents in the pricing of initial public offerings, the role played by venture capitalists in the success or failure of startup firms.

== Selected publications ==
- Matusik, Sharon F.; Hill, Charles W. L. (October 1998). "The Utilization of Contingent Work, Knowledge Creation, and Competitive Advantage". The Academy of Management Review. 23 (4): 680. doi:10.5465/amr.1998.1255633.
- Matusik, Sharon F.; Heeley, Michael B. (August 2005). "Absorptive Capacity in the Software Industry: Identifying Dimensions That Affect Knowledge and Knowledge Creation Activities". Journal of Management. 31 (4): 549–572. doi:10.1177/0149206304272293. S2CID 144165373.
- Heeley, Michael B.; Matusik, Sharon F.; Jain, Neelam (February 2007). "Innovation, Appropriability, and the Underpricing of Initial Public Offerings". The Academy of Management Journal. 50 (1): 209–225. doi:10.5465/amj.2007.24162388.
- Matusik, Sharon F; Mickel, Amy E (August 2011). "Embracing or embattled by converged mobile devices? Users' experiences with a contemporary connectivity technology". Human Relations. 64 (8): 1001–1030. doi:10.1177/0018726711405552. S2CID 145457464.
- Drover, Will; Busenitz, Lowell; Matusik, Sharon; Townsend, David; Anglin, Aaron; Dushnitsky, Gary (July 2017). "A Review and Road Map of Entrepreneurial Equity Financing Research: Venture Capital, Corporate Venture Capital, Angel Investment, Crowdfunding, and Accelerators" (PDF). Journal of Management. 43 (6): 1820–1853. doi:10.1177/0149206317690584. S2CID 149047664.
