= Gareth M. James =

New Zealand statistician and academic administrator

Gareth Michael James

Dean of the UCLA Anderson School of Management
- Incumbent
- Assumed office July 1, 2026
- Preceded by: Margaret Shih (interim)

Gareth Michael James is a New Zealand statistician and academic administrator who is the 10th dean of the UCLA Anderson School of Management and the John E. Anderson Chair in Management. He assumed the position on July 1, 2026.

== Early life and education ==
James is a native of New Zealand.

In 1994, he earned a Bachelor of Science and a Bachelor of Commerce from the University of Auckland, where he majored in statistics and finance. He was awarded a Fulbright Scholarship to study in the United States and attended Stanford University, where he earned a Ph.D. in statistics in 1998.

== Career ==
James joined the faculty of the Information and Operations Management department at the USC Marshall School of Business in 1998. In 2013, he became professor of data sciences and operations and was named E. Morgan Stanley Chair in Business Administration in 2014. He served as vice dean for faculty and academic affairs from 2013 to 2017 before being named interim dean in 2019.

In July 2022, James became the John H. Harland Dean of Emory University's Goizueta Business School.

In January 2026, UCLA announced that James had been appointed the next dean of the UCLA Anderson School of Management, succeeding interim dean Margaret Shih. He began his tenure on July 1, 2026, becoming UCLA Anderson's 10th dean and the John E. Anderson Chair in Management.

James is a scholar and researcher in statistics, data science and machine learning. His published works include articles, conference proceedings and book chapters focused on statistical and machine learning methodologies. He is a co-author of the textbook An Introduction to Statistical Learning. He has led multiple National Science Foundation research grants and has served as an associate editor for several research journals. He is an elected Fellow of the American Statistical Association and the Institute of Mathematical Statistics.

James has also received a number of teaching awards. He is a recipient of the Evan C. Thompson Faculty Teaching and Learning Innovation Award and a three-time winner of the Marshall School of Business' Golden Apple Award for best instructor in the full-time MBA program. He has also received awards for mentoring junior colleagues and graduate students.

== Family ==
James is married and has two children. His wife is a member of the public health faculty at UCLA.
