= DJ Graffiti =

- Also known as: DJ Graffiti
- Born: Martin Smith
- Origin: Detroit, Michigan, USA
- Genres: Hip hop
- Occupations: DJ, and producer
- Labels: Art Associates

DJ Graffiti, is a Michigan based DJ, Producer and manager. He is also the founder of Overflow, a digital marketing company.

He is a graduate of the University of Michigan's Ross Business School and Michigan Law School. He began DJing his freshman year of college, releasing Mix Tapes of underground hip-hop soon after featuring tracks by artists such as Jurassic 5, J Live, Athletic Mic League, People Under The Stairs and Mr. Lif. Graffiti does produce original tracks as well, including “Underground Raw,” which features the Eminem protégé Obie Trice. Since then DJ Graffiti has been called "the underground mix tape king of Michigan," partially due to a nomination he received at the Detroit Rap Awards.

DJ Graffiti received the title "Best DJ" in 2010 by Real Detroit Weekly which called him "our town’s premier DJ". The magazine The Promoter deemed DJ Graffiti "an icon in Michigan's underground hip-hop community." He is also featured in the 2003 edition of the book The All Music Guide to Hip Hop.

== Discography ==
- Hipsters Need Soul Too CD 2009
- Soul Beautiful CD 2009
- Bling Free Vol.3: It's Official! CD 2004.
- Bling Free Vol. 2: Wake Up! CD 2002
