= Surgery simulator =

Medical technology

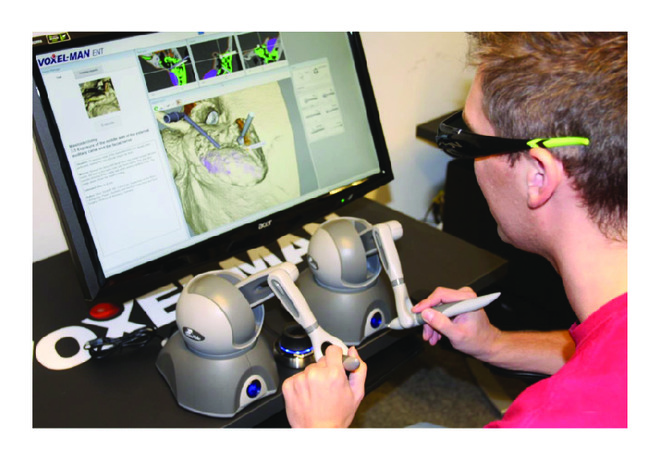
A surgery simulator used for training

A surgery simulator is computer technology developed to simulate surgical procedures for the purpose of training medical professionals, without the need of a patient, cadaver or animal. The concept goes back to the 1980s with video games, but only in the 1990s with three-dimensional graphics and the 2000s with the use of motion sensors for realistic movements (motion control) has the technology been able to simulate the real situation. The most common type of surgery taught through this method is laparoscopic surgery, although it has also been used to do a trial run before other kinds of procedures. Cataract surgery and other ophthalmic procedures are also widely taught using surgical simulators.

== Uses ==
Surgery simulators are generally used to train medical students and surgeons in specific types of procedures without the use of animals or cadavers before working with live patients. They are best suited for two types of skills needed for surgery, eye–hand coordination and the ability to perform three-dimensional actions using a two-dimensional screen as a guide. Eye-hand coordination is improved because the simulation can give both visual feedback, by way of a screen, as well as tactile feedback that simulates the manipulation of organs and tissue.

This kind of virtual reality is most often used in the training of surgeons in laparoscopic procedures, as in reality it is not possible to see the operation being performed. The simulator uses a computer screen displaying a three-dimensional graphic of the organs being operated on. Various surgical tools or gloves are connected to motion sensors and haptic or tactile feedback mechanisms where the user can physically feel the difference in simulated tissue and organs. The user can "perform surgery" upon the virtual organs by manipulating the tools, which are also displayed on the screen as the user moves them, and the tools also provide force-feedback and collision detection to indicate to the user when they are pushing on or moving some organs or tissue. By inputting data from computerized tomography (CT) and magnetic resonance imaging (MRI) scans the patient can be replicated in the virtual environment. The simulations can also provide more intensive training activity with the introduction of rare pathological cases and complications.

However, the use of these simulators has its limitations. While significant gains have been seen with their use in novices, their effectiveness diminishes as the procedure is repeated with students reaching a plateau. For more experienced surgeons, the use of these simulators have had very limited use.

== Development of the technology ==
Virtual surgery as a means to simulate procedures and train surgeons grew out of the video game industry. Video games for entertainment has been one of the largest industries in the world for some time. However, as early as the 1980s, companies such as Atari began working on ideas of how to use these video environments for training people in different tasks and different professions. Younger trainees in the medical field showed greater eye–hand coordination and quick thinking abilities over those who had never played. Although graphics were extremely limited, Atari began developing several types of simulators related to health care. This type of training met with strong skepticism until studies in the mid-1980s began to show that the concept had promise.

However, the graphic and interactive limitations of video games hindered their development and usefulness until the 1990s, when companies such as Nintendo and Sony began to produce three dimensional polygon graphics to produce the concept of "virtual reality." This improved more with the introduction of Wii systems what allowed more realistic manipulation of the virtual reality through motion sensors. Studies at this time showed that the new interaction method improved coordination and space perception. The advances also allowed the technology to move from "game" to "simulator." DaVinci Surgical System programmed their first simulator for laparoscopic surgery in 2005, and its accuracy and design made it quickly accepted by surgeons. While most of this technology has been used for general surgical training, it has also been used to plan specific surgeries as well. The first virtual surgery (where actual surgery followed the virtual practice) was performed on 17 August 2009 when Dr. David Clarke in Halifax, Nova Scotia removed a brain tumour 24 hours after removing a simulated tumour. By 2010, numerous hospitals had some kind of simulation technology available for medical professionals, especially for the training of laparoscopic procedures.

The use of this kind of simulation technology continues to be important, especially with younger generations of medical students. These students have grown up with both entertainment video games and serious games, those developed for educational purposes, making the use of simulators both more acceptable and effective. These students have been shown to more readily benefit from this kind of training, especially in areas of laparoscopic procedures and suturing.

== Examples ==
The most widely used simulator for laparoscopic surgery today is the da Vinci Surgery Simulator. It is the newest way to practice these procedures that involves the surgeon in the surgery and control of the device. The simulator is a tutorial that prepares a surgeon for the real surgery at the da Vinci Surgical System. It contains real time images, identical controls of the original device and potential problems that may occur during a real surgery.

In a study of another program, the Minimally Invasive Surgical Trainer-Virtual Reality (MIST-VR), participants were tested on 10 consecutive times within a 1-month period. Assessment of laparoscopic skills included time, errors, and economy of hand movement, measured by the simulator.

One of the more popular games/simulators has been Trauma Center, a game based around solving puzzles and problems that might occur during surgery. The objective of the game is attending to patients that have sustained accidents, broken bones, internal bleeding and trauma, as well as responding to various diagnoses and performing various surgical procedures. The objective of the game is to make the user think faster and increase their ability to solve problems at the surgical table. Surgeons and health experts say that the game is perfect to accelerate the time of decision making at the surgical desk because it is a game based on placing pressure on the user by giving the user a time limit.

The EyeSi is a virtual reality simulator for intraocular surgery training. The HelpMeSee Eye Surgery simulator is another virtual reality simulator with realtime haptic feedback, that is used to train trainees for Manual Small Incision Cataract Surgery.
