= Douglas Miller (surgeon) =

Scottish neurosurgeon

James Douglas Miller FRSE (20 July 1937 – 23 August 1995) was a Scottish neurosurgeon of international repute. The Douglas Miller Memorial Lecture is named in his honour.

== Life ==
He was born in Glasgow on 20 July 1937. His father was an executive at Collins the publisher. He was educated at Glasgow Academy then studied medicine at the University of Glasgow graduating with an MB ChB. Meeting Bryan Jennett he was inspired to be a neurosurgeon.

From 1962 to 1965 he was Surgical Senior House Officer at Glasgow Royal Infirmary. From 1965 to 1967 he was a Medical Research Council Fellow. In 1969 he went to America to the University of Pennsylvania to study under Dr Langfitt. In 1971 he returned to Scotland and began lecturing in neurosurgery at the University of Glasgow. In 1975 he became Professor of Neurosurgery at the Medical College of Virginia and in 1981 returned to Scotland as Professor of Surgical Neurology at the University of Edinburgh. He was also a practising neurosurgeon at Edinburgh's Western General Hospital. Noted Indian neurosurgeon B. K. Misra is one of his students.

In 1992 he was elected a Fellow of the Royal Society of Edinburgh. His proposers were Phillip Harris, Cameron Gould, Sir Patrick Forrest and Sir Abraham Goldberg.

He died of a heart attack in Edinburgh on 23 August 1995.

== Family ==
In 1965 he was married to Margaret (Margot) Rainey. They had two sons, Derek and Kenneth.
