= Leeds School of Business =

Coordinates: 40°00′20″N 105°15′48″W

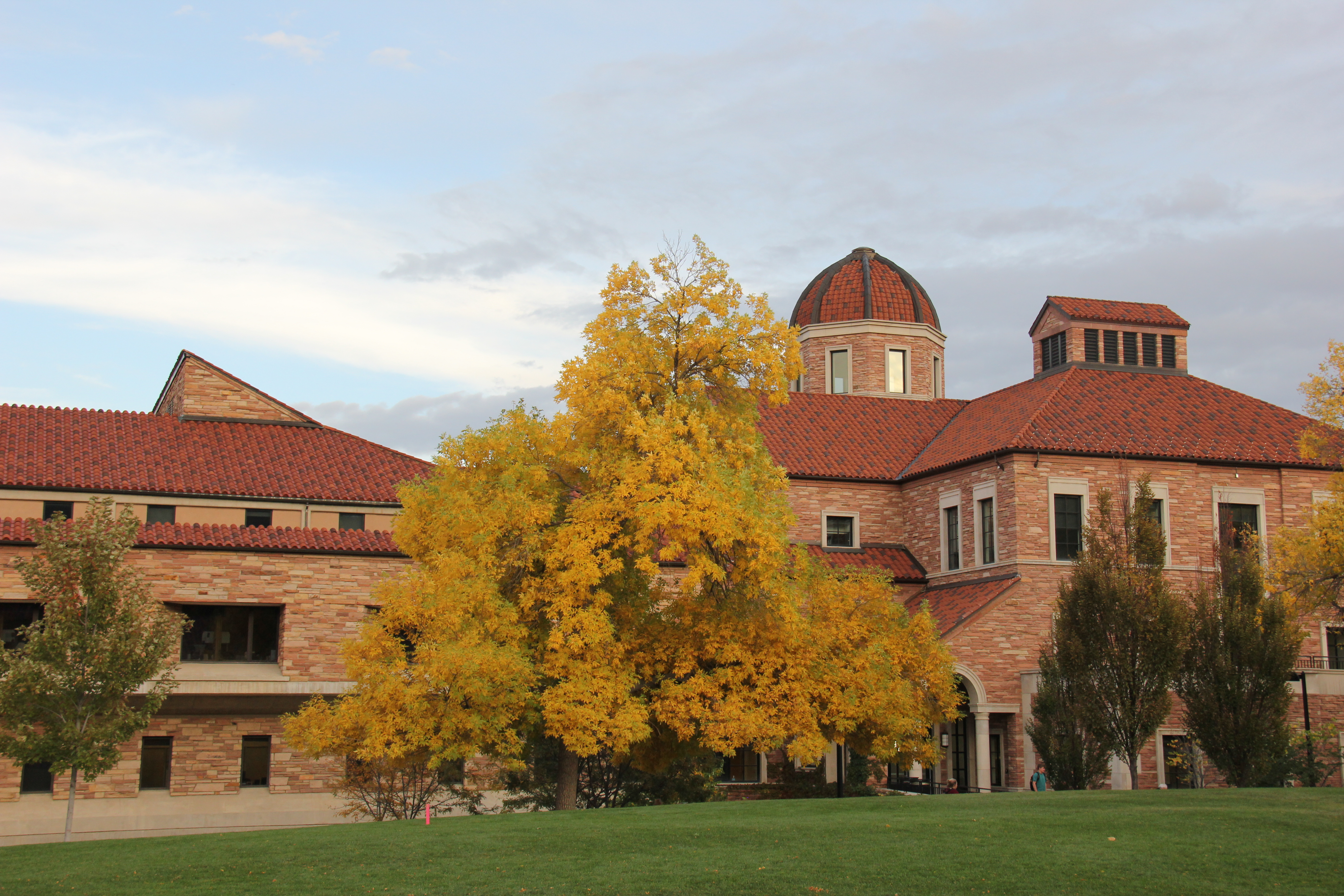
Koelbel Building (which houses the Leeds School of Business) at the University of Colorado-Boulder

The Leeds School of Business is a college of the University of Colorado Boulder in the United States, established 1906. As of April 2022, the school reports an enrollment of over 3800 undergraduate students. In 2001, the college was named for the Leeds family, spearheaded by alumnus Michael Leeds of New York, who committed $35 million to the school. Vijay Khatri is the current dean.

== History ==
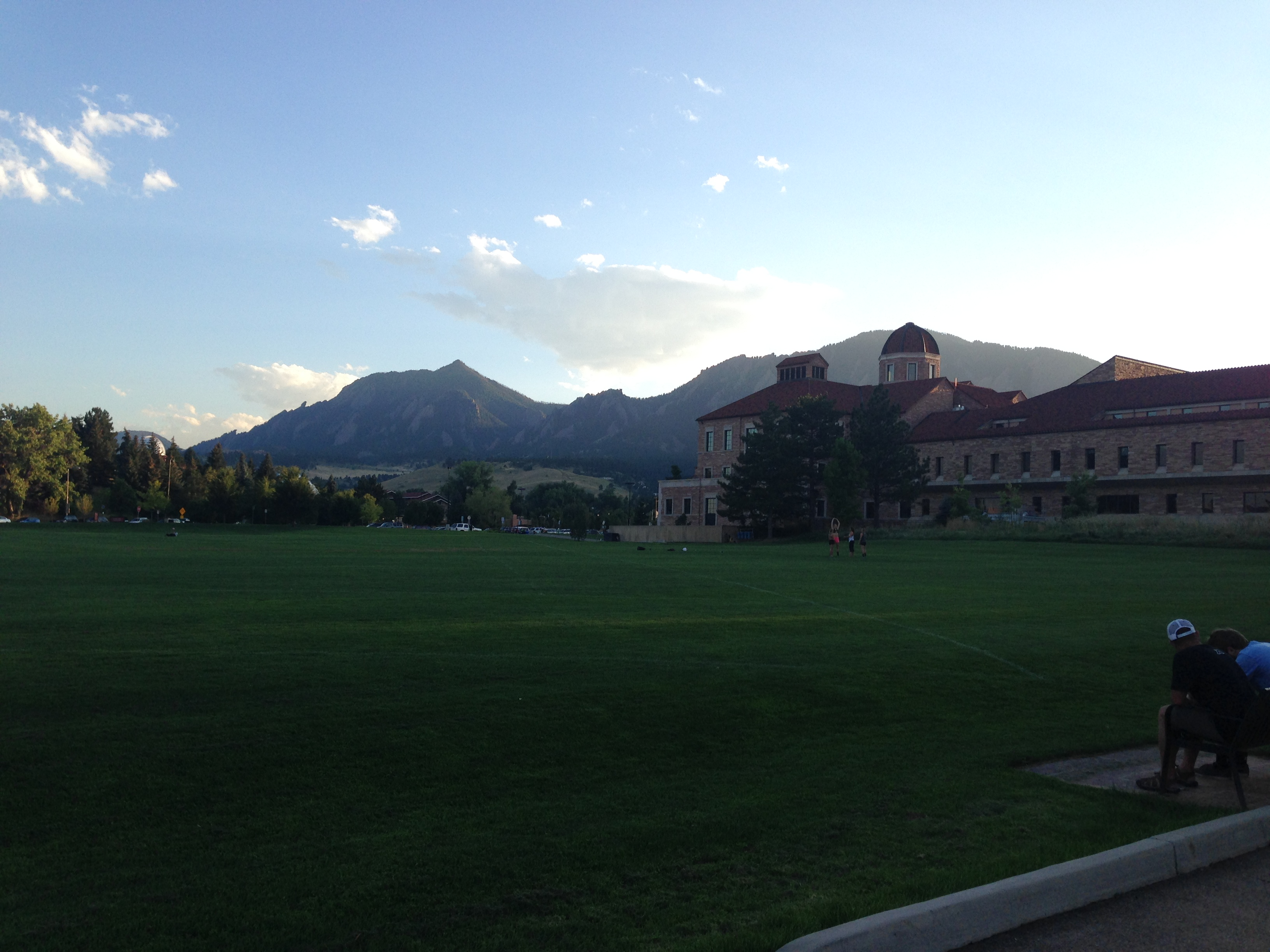
Business Field, Outside the Koelbel Building, September 2014

What is today known as the Leeds School of Business began in 1906 as the College of Comm, a division of the College of Liberal Arts. The University of Colorado was one of the leaders in establishing a college of commerce, according to the Biennial Report of 1906-1908. The report noted that the distinction between the College of Commerce and the ordinary business college. "The man who is to be a leader in business must know something of law, economics, the markets of the world, and the location of available power and labor."

In 1922, the business program became the School of Business Administration and relocated to the basement of Guggenheim, the former law school building. The faculty was enlarged to a total of 15, and the school was on its way to become one of the university's first principal professional schools.

The business program was accredited by the Association to Advance Collegiate Schools of Business (AACSB), the accrediting body of business schools, in 1937. The AACSB recognition is only given to those schools that achieve and maintain established standards with respect to curriculum, faculty, library resources, and financial support. At this point the business school was still without a real home. Classes were being held in several buildings across campus.

In 1960, the school began offering doctoral degrees in business, and by 1965 the success of the program prompted the University of Colorado Board of Regents to establish the Graduate School of Business to administer master's degrees. The school moved to its present location in 1970.

In October 2001, the Leeds family of New York made a $35 million commitment to the University of Colorado Boulder's business school, the country's seventh largest endowment to a business school. The school was renamed the Leeds School of Business in recognition of the gift.

From 2009- 2011 Manuel Laguna served as interim dean after Dennis Ahlburg accepted the presidency of Trinity University in San Antonio.

In January 2011 it was announced that David L. Ikenberry had been appointed dean of the Leeds School of Business. He had previously held the position of Associate Dean at the College of Business at the University of Illinois at Urbana-Champaign. He stepped down as Dean in 2016.

In 2019 the school has: more than 55 tenure track faculty and 28 instructors; more than 3,400 undergraduates; over 200 full-time MBA students and 115 evening MBA students; and over 40 PhD students.

The newly expanded and renovated building for CU-Boulder's school of business is named in honor of the Koelbel family, leaders in Colorado real estate development, construction and sales, in recognition of their long-time support of CU and the business school. In August 2007, the newly renovated and expanded Koelbel building opened for classes. The old building was designed to hold 800 students, and had not been renovated in 38 years.

== Academics ==
=== Undergraduate program ===
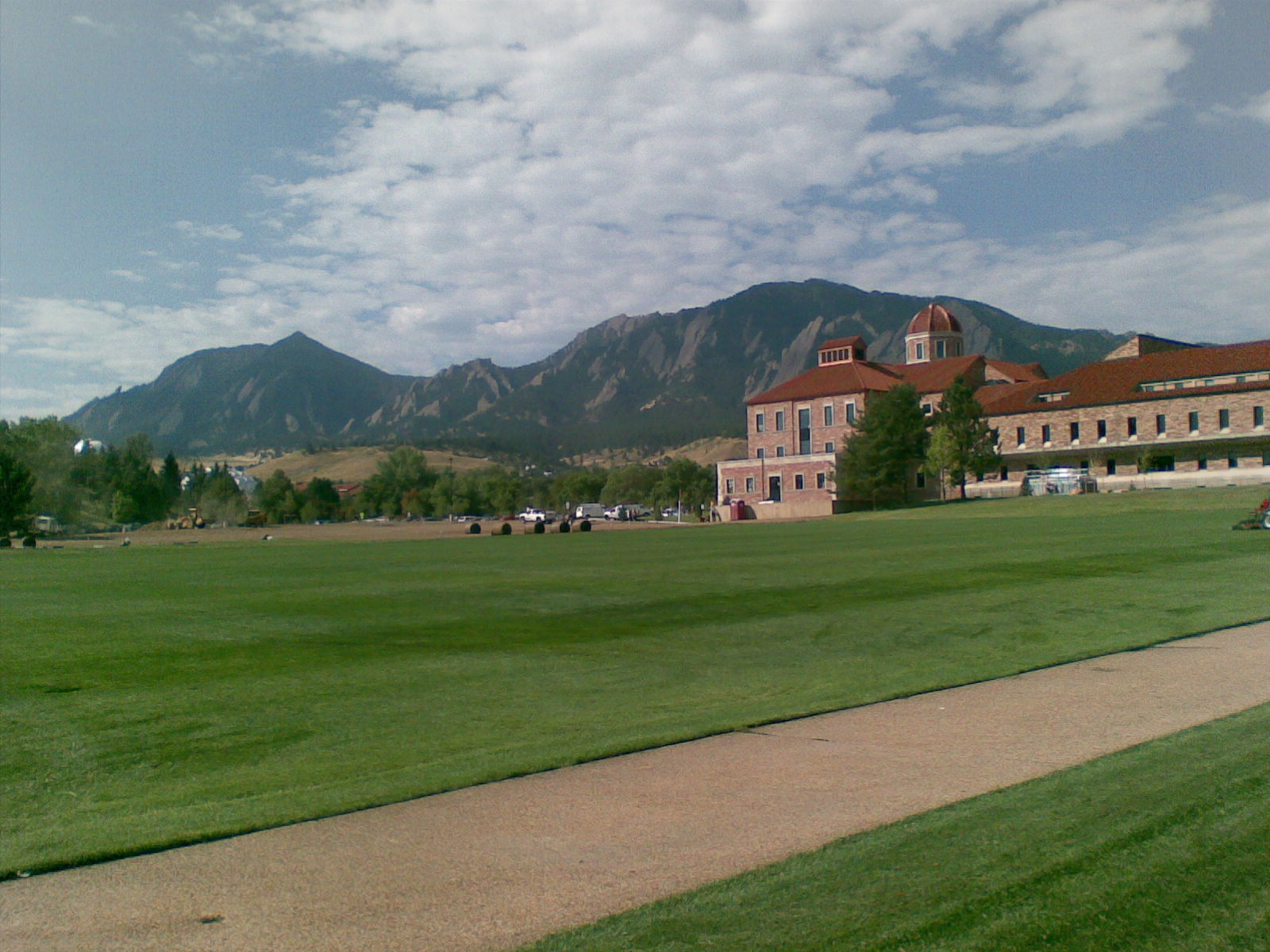
Field outside Leeds School of Business

The Leeds School of Business offers only one undergraduate degree, a Bachelor's in Science of Business Administration (BSBA). A BSBA is offered with concentrations in Accounting, Finance, Marketing, Management and Entrepreneurship, and Real Estate. The four-year degree requires a combination of Arts and Sciences core classes, a set of Business Core classes, concentration specific classes and upper division business electives.

==== Certificate programs ====
In addition to major emphasis options, students may also fulfill requirements to earn a certificate in entrepreneurship, global business, quantitative finance, business leadership, business of sports, certificate in social responsibility and ethics, operations and information management.

==== Course offerings ====
Courses are offered in many aspects of business. These include Accounting, Business Ethics, Entrepreneurship, Finance, International Business, Management, Marketing, Real Estate and Sustainability.

=== Graduate program ===
Business school rankings

United States
- Bloomberg MBA: 64
- USNWR MBA: 71

The Leeds School of Business graduate program offers graduate degrees in several areas. The largest graduate area is the Leeds Masters in Business Administration, or MBA, program. Leeds also offers Masters in Science, or MS, degrees in several business areas including accounting and finance.
