= Consortium for Graduate Study in Management =

US non-profit organization

- Abbreviation: CGSM
- Formation: 1966
- Type: Non-profit organization
- Purpose: "The vision of The Consortium is to work toward the day when African Americans, Hispanic Americans and Native Americans are no longer underrepresented in management careers in the business community of the United States."
- Headquarters: St. Louis, Missouri
- Region served: United States of America
- Executive Director and CEO: Peter J. Aranda III
- Website: www.cgsm.org

The Consortium for Graduate Study in Management was founded in 1966 and is a 501(c)(3) organization dedicated to ensuring the equal representation of African Americans, Hispanic Americans and Native Americans in management careers in the business community of the United States of America. The Consortium is so named for the collaboration among its staff and board of trustees; its 20-member MBA programs; and its approximately 75 corporate partners, which work together toward the mission "to enhance diversity in business education and leadership by helping to reduce the serious underrepresentation of African Americans, Hispanic Americans and Native Americans in both our member schools’ enrollments and the ranks of management."

== Organization and operation ==
The Consortium is a nonprofit educational organization dedicated to increasing African American, Hispanic American and Native American representation among the ranks of leading MBA programs and corporations throughout the United States. The staff and the organization's headquarters are in Chesterfield, Missouri. Oversight comes by way of a 23-member board of trustees, which is composed of representatives of its member schools, alumni and corporate partners.

The Consortium celebrated its 50th anniversary in the 2015-2016 fiscal year.

The organization works with its 20 member schools and their full-time MBA programs to recruit potential MBA students who are African American, Hispanic American, Native American, or who share The Consortium's commitment to principles of diversity and inclusiveness in corporate management. Potential Consortium fellows can apply for up to six participating MBA programs through The Consortium and rank their preferred MBA programs. If they are admitted to the program, the MBA programs can award merit-based, full-tuition Consortium fellowships to the students.

The recruiting season culminates with The Consortium's annual Orientation Program & Career Forum, a gathering of 1,200 MBA prospects, university representatives, corporate partner representatives and alumni for an intensive five-day conference of preparatory events, networking opportunities, job interviews and socializing.

In 2015, The Consortium recruited a class of 420 MBA students; the organization has more than 8,000 alumni.

=== Admission process ===
The admissions process for The Consortium opens annually on Aug. 15, with a first-round deadline on Oct. 15 and a second-round deadline on Jan. 5. The Consortium's common application allows students to apply online through the organization for Consortium membership and for admission to any six of the organization's 20 member schools. After the application period closes, The Consortium coordinates with representatives from the 20 schools, who can offer merit-based full-scholarship fellowships to prospective students. Admission to The Consortium is somewhat separate from admission to a member MBA program. Students who are admitted to The Consortium, who choose to attend a member school and who receive a scholarship are considered Consortium fellows. Students admitted to The Consortium and who attend a member MBA program, but who were not granted a scholarship, may still be Consortium members and take advantage of other benefits of The Consortium.

== History ==
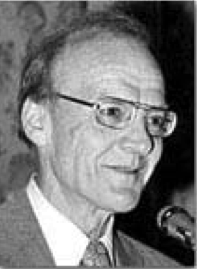
Sterling Schoen was a management professor at Washington University in St. Louis and the founder of The Consortium for Graduate Study in Management.

Sterling Schoen, a management professor at Washington University in St. Louis, realized over the course of his research that at the time, in 1965, the Fortune 500 companies had zero African Americans among their management ranks. His research led him to conclude that full-time MBA programs could contribute toward redressing racial inequality. He worked with a team of 60 respected educators, business managers and community leaders toward the creation of a cooperative network of universities. He initially won commitments from three schools — his own, plus the University of Wisconsin and Indiana University — in creating The Consortium for Graduate Study in Management.

Recruiting began for the initial class of 21 African American men, and The Consortium secured support at that time from 27 corporate partners. The first class met in its initial "Orientation Program," an intensive preparation program for incoming MBA students, during the summer before the 1967–68 school year.

=== Consortium recognition ===
At The Consortium's annual Orientation Program (or, "OP," as students and alumni refer to it), the organization recognizes individuals who particularly have embodied its principles established by four key members in its history, who have the following awards named for them:

The Sterling H. Schoen Achievement Award: Established in honor of The Consortium's founder, Dr. Sterling H. Schoen, an agent for change in graduate management education in partnership with American businesses. The award is presented annually to individuals in recognition of their courageous leadership and commitment in advancing the goal of equal opportunity for underrepresented minorities in American business. It has been awarded annually since 2001. Schoen served as founding director until 1980, when he returned to pure academia on the Washington University faculty. He died in 1999.

Peter C. Thorp Corporate Leadership Award: Established in honor of the corporate advisory board chairman and board member. Thorp had been a supporter in helping The Consortium work towards its mission of providing education to traditionally underrepresented minorities in pursuit of their MBAs. It has been awarded annually since 2001.

Wallace L. Jones Lifetime Achievement Award: Wallace L. Jones contributed many years of dedicated service to The Consortium and touched the lives of thousands of its students and graduates. He was its assistant director under Schoen, then became The Consortium's director in 1980, upon Schoen's resignation, and served until 1996. In his honor, the award was established to recognize an alumnus who has excelled or demonstrated commitment in areas such as professional achievement; community involvement; mentoring; and the advancement of The Consortium's mission. The award has been given annually since 2004. Wallace Jones died in 1997.

The Phyllis Scott Buford Young Visionary Award: Dr. Phyllis Scott Buford, The Consortium's third leader, modernized the annual Orientation Program, expanding The Consortium's collaboration with corporate partners and exposing opportunities to more diverse young leaders through the conference. This award recognizes a young alumnus who is a “leader in action,” demonstrating vision, collaboration and creativity in driving diversity and inclusion in their professional life. The award is given annually and was first given in 2017. She died in 2016.

Leslie Elise Adkins Endowed Scholarship Award: The Leslie Elise Adkins Endowed Scholarship Award is presented to African American students, particularly women, with preference given to those attending the University of Southern California Marshall School of Business or the Tuck School of Business at Dartmouth College. This scholarship is given in tribute to Leslie Elise Adkins, a 2015 Consortium alumna who died of complications from chronic diabetes soon after completing her MBA at the University of Southern California. The scholarship was first awarded in 2017.

== Member schools ==
Two years after Washington University in St. Louis, Indiana University, and the University of Wisconsin joined to create The Consortium, the University of Rochester the University of Southern California also joined.

In 1970, The Consortium opened its membership to include women, Hispanic Americans and Native Americans. This sparked growth in the number of member students and corporate and university partners. In 2004, the organization further evolved to include all U.S. citizens and permanent residents who have demonstrated a commitment to The Consortium's mission.

The following full-time MBA programs joined The Consortium for Graduate Study in Management between 1973 and 2022:

- 1973: University of North Carolina at Chapel Hill
- 1983: University of Michigan – Ann Arbor
- 1984: New York University and The University of Texas at Austin
- 1992: University of Virginia
- 1993: University of California, Berkeley (withdrew in 2003, rejoined in 2010)
- 1999: Dartmouth College
- 2001: Carnegie Mellon University and Emory University
- 2008: Yale University
- 2009: Cornell University
- 2010: University of California, Los Angeles
- 2013: Georgetown University
- 2017: Rice University
- 2018: University of Washington
- 2021: Columbia Business School
- 2022: Stanford University
- 2023: Northwestern University
