= UCLA Anderson School of Management =

Business school at University of California, Los Angeles

Coordinates: 34.073833°N 118.443539°W

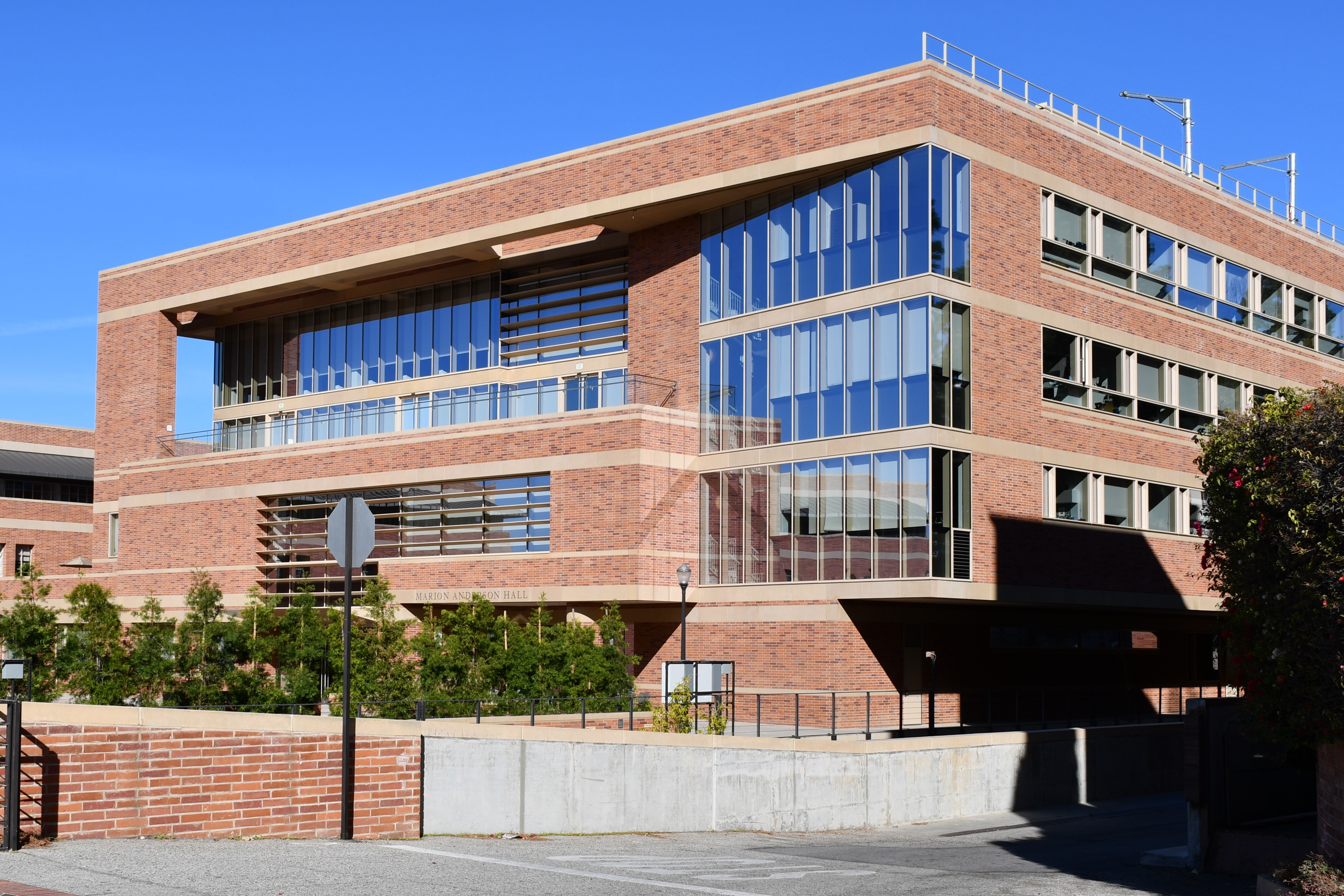
- Marion Anderson Hall at UCLA Anderson
- Former names: School of Management at UCLA (1935–1950); School of Business Administration (1950–1955); Graduate School of Business Administration (1955–1970s); Graduate School of Management (1970s–1987)
- Motto: Think in the next.
- Type: Public
- Established: 1935
- Parent institution: University of California, Los Angeles
- Endowment: US$280 million
- Dean: Gareth M. James
- Students: 1750
- Location: Los Angeles, California, United States
- Campus: Urban
- Website: anderson.ucla.edu

The John E. Anderson Graduate School of Management (branded as UCLA Anderson) is the graduate business school at the University of California, Los Angeles. The school offers MBA (full-time, part-time, executive), Post Graduate Program for Executives (PGPX), Financial Engineering, Business Analytics, and PhD degrees. It was named after American billionaire John E. Anderson in 1987, after he donated $15 million to the School of Management (the largest gift received from an individual by the University of California at the time).

== History ==
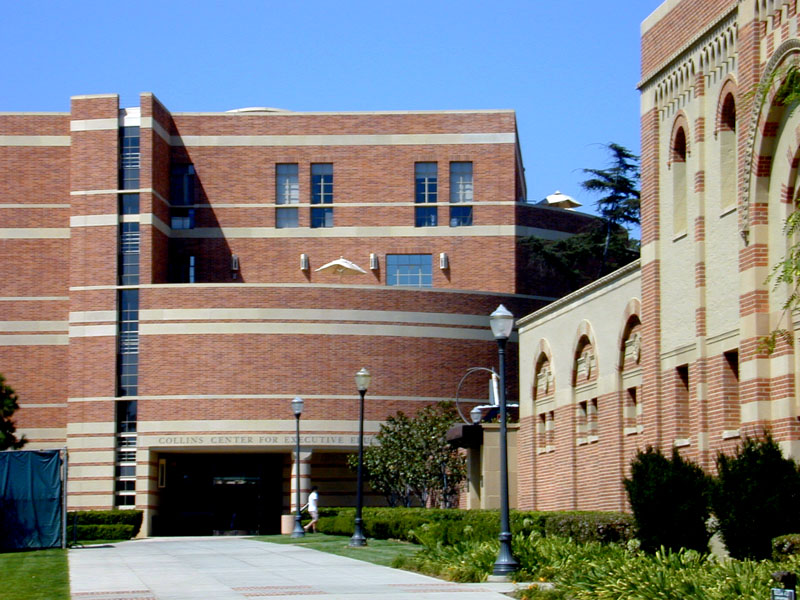
Collins Center at the UCLA Anderson School of Management

The School of Management at UCLA was founded in 1935, and the MBA degree was authorized by the Regents of the University of California four years later. In its early years, the school was primarily an undergraduate institution, although this began to change in the 1950s after the appointment of Neil H. Jacoby as dean; the last undergraduate degree was awarded in 1969. UCLA is rare among public universities in the United States for not offering undergraduate business administration degrees. Undergraduate degrees in business economics are offered through the UCLA College of Letters and Science.

In 1950, the school was renamed the School of Business Administration. Five years later, it became the Graduate School of Business Administration; in the 1970s the school's name was changed again to the Graduate School of Management.

In 1987, John E. Anderson (1917–2011), class of 1940, donated $15 million to the school and prompted the construction of a new complex at the north end of UCLA's campus. He later donated an additional $25 million. The six-building, 285,000-square-foot (26,500 m^{2}) facility, was designed by Henry N. Cobb of the architectural firm Pei Cobb Freed & Partners and Executive Architects Leidenfrost/Horowitz & Associates. It cost $75 million to construct and opened officially in 1995.

On May 13, 2015, Marion Anderson, widow of the late John Anderson, announced a $100 million donation (4th single-largest donation to a business school in the United States) to the school for fellowships and research, along with $40 million earmarked for initiating development of what is now known as the Marion Anderson Hall.

Recently, the school has been mostly self-funded, with only $6 million of government funding out of its $96 million budget in 2010-11. In fall 2010, the school proposed "financial self-sufficiency": Giving up all state funding, in return for freedom from some state rules and freedom to raise tuition. Critics called this proposal "privatization", but the school rejected this description, with former Dean Judy Olian saying, "This is not privatization.... We will continue to be part of UCLA and part of the state." The proposal met objections in the UCLA Academic Senate (faculty members from all UCLA departments), but was ultimately approved by the University of California President Mark Yudof in June 2013. The year 2010 also marked UCLA Anderson's entry into the Consortium for Graduate Study in Management, with its inaugural Consortium class enrolling in the full-time MBA program during Fall 2011.

In July 2018, Judy D. Olian, who served as the eighth dean of UCLA's Anderson School of Management, became Quinnipiac University's first female president when she took over for John Lahey, who retired in June 2018. Alfred Osborne, Associate Senior Dean of External Affairs and a professor at the UCLA Anderson School of Management, began serving as the school’s interim dean on July 1, 2018. Antonio Bernardo, a member of the finance faculty since 1994, was appointed UCLA Anderson’s ninth dean, effective July 1, 2019.

== Campus ==
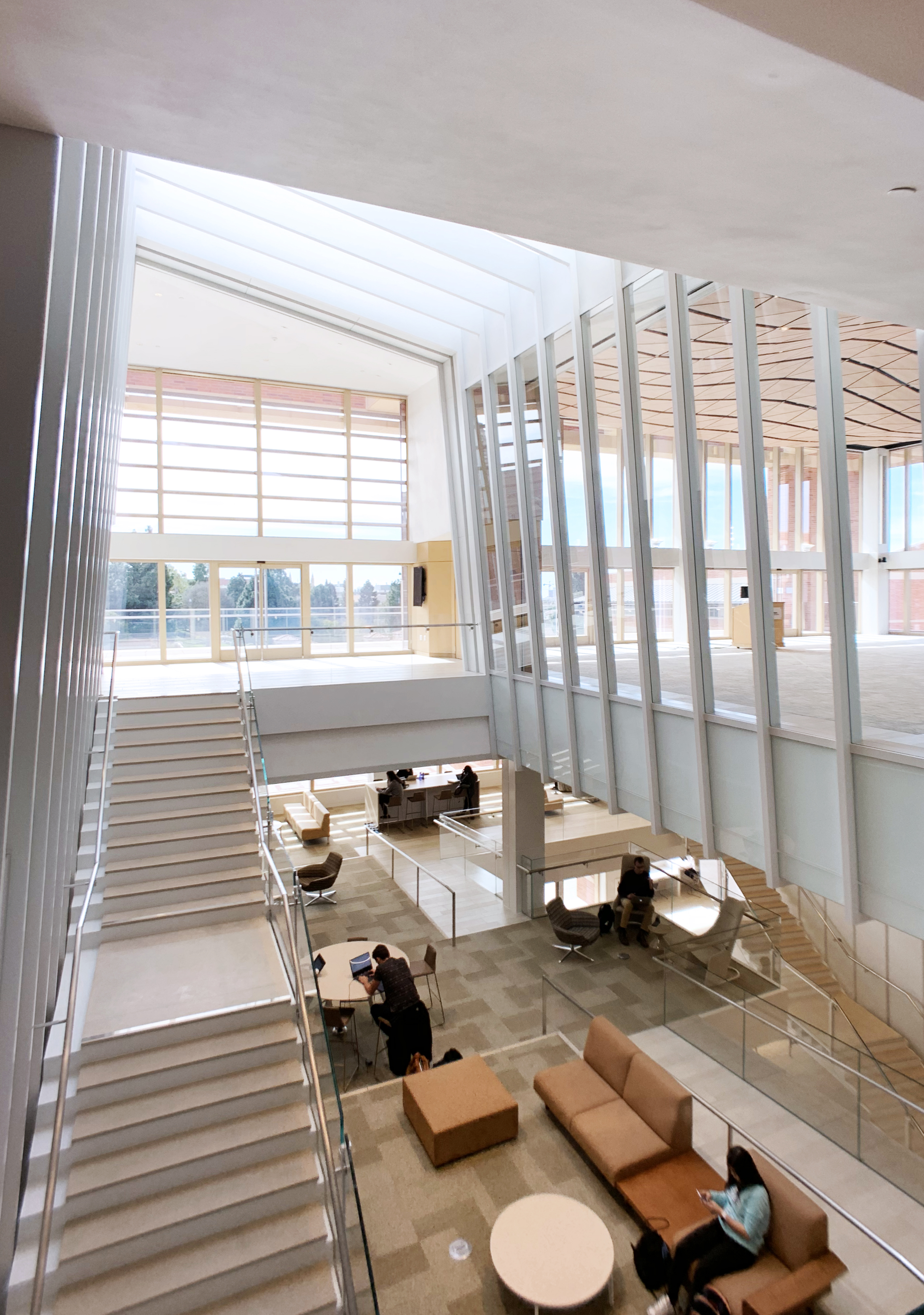
Marion Anderson Hall Atrium

The school is located on north part of the UCLA campus. The four main buildings, Mullin, Cornell, Entrepreneurs, and Gold, form an inner circle at the corner of Sunset Boulevard and Westwood Plaza, which is the extension of Westwood Boulevard. Connected to the Gold building is the Collins building, which is named for alumnus James A. Collins, who is the chairman emeritus of Sizzler International, Inc. and who funded the John R. Wooden statue in front of Pauley Pavilion.

The new Marion Anderson Hall addition opened February 12, 2020. The 64,000 square-foot campus addition is estimated to cost $80 million and is one hundred percent donor-funded. Marion Anderson Hall is designed by a collaboration of Gensler, leading the interior architecture, and exterior design by Pei Cobb Freed & Partners, the same architectural firm that designed the original Anderson complex. The new building features four floors, interactive work, learning and event spaces, LEED Platinum certification, and will serve as the prominent entrance to the Anderson complex.

== Graduate programs ==
The range of programs offered by Anderson includes:

- Accounting minor for undergraduates
- Full Time MBA program
- Ph.D.
- Fully Employed MBA
- Executive MBA
- Master of Financial Engineering
- Master of Science in Business Analytics
- Global EMBA for Asia Pacific
- Post Graduate Program in Management for Executives (UCLA PGPX)
- Post Graduate Program in Management for Professionals (UCLA PGP PRO)

=== MBA programs ===
As of 2011, UCLA Anderson enrolls 70 executive MBA, 90 global MBA, 280 fully employed MBA, and 360 full-time MBA students every year. UCLA Anderson’s teaching model combines case study, experiential learning, lecture and team projects. UCLA Anderson’s curriculum consists of ten core classes (required courses which cover a broad range of business fundamentals) and twelve (minimum) elective courses. Students are assigned to cohorts, called sections, of 65 students throughout the core curriculum.

The cohort system is almost entirely student run, with each cohort electing 17 different leadership positions ranging from President to Ethics chair. In addition, there is the student-led Anderson Student Association (ASA) which deals with all issues of student life including company recruiting, social clubs and academic issues.

Students may choose (but are not required) to focus in one or more of the following areas:

- Accounting
- Decisions, Operations, and Technology Management
- Communications, Media, and Entertainment Management
- Entrepreneurial Studies
- Finance
- Global Economics and Management
- Human Resources and Organizational Behavior
- Information Systems
- Marketing
- Policy
- Real Estate

Anderson also offers an Applied Management Research Program (AMR), consisting of a two-quarter team-based strategic consulting field study project required during the second year of study in lieu of the comprehensive exam for the master's degree. Students complete strategic projects for companies partnering with the school, ultimately presenting recommendations to senior management. The program has been around since the late 1960s and is presently led by Professor Gonzalo Freixes, its Faculty Director. In 2004, two alternatives to the field study were introduced: a Business Creation Option, and a research study option.

=== Master of Science in Business Analytics ===
The Anderson School of Management has also began accepting admissions for their Business Analytics program in 2017.

=== Executive education ===
Since 1954, UCLA Anderson has been providing executive education to both organizations and individuals. According to the school the learning is not confined to just campus.

UCLA PGPX

The School also offers a PGPX programme for executives. According to Judy Olian, Dean, UCLA Anderson School of Management, the PGPX program has general management curriculum. UCLA PGPX is a comprehensive programme of one year primarily conducted by senior faculty members from the UCLA Anderson School of Management as well as industry experts. Besides this UCLA Anderson School of Management also offers executive programs on corporate governance, creativity & innovation, women leadership and media.

=== Doctoral program ===
The following academic units currently offer doctoral training:

- Accounting
- Behavioral Decision Making
- Decisions, Operations & Technology Management
- Finance
- Global Economics and Management
- Management and Organizations
- Marketing
- Strategy

== Rankings ==
Business school rankings

United States
- QS MBA: 8
- Financial Times MBA: 13
- Bloomberg MBA: 18
- USNWR MBA: 18
- THE Business: 13

Global
- QS MBA: 18
- Financial Times MBA: 32
- THE Business: 20

In September 2017, the School announced the publication of a new online journal chronicling its faculty’s research into crucial issues in business, the economy, and the wider world. The UCLA Anderson Review's content ranges from brief accounts of individual faculty research projects to long-read articles examining in-depth the issues explored by groups of UCLA Anderson faculty.

== Research ==
The Harold and Pauline Price Center for Entrepreneurial Studies oversees all teaching, research, extracurricular, and community activities related to entrepreneurship at UCLA Anderson. It helps participants such as Head Start directors, early childcare professionals, and owners of developing businesses to direct and grow their organizations with a focused, well-managed, entrepreneurial flair.

The Laurence and Lori Fink Center for Finance & Investments (CFI) is named for BlackRock CEO Laurence D. Fink, and sponsors research, teaching and the application of financial knowledge in the global corporate and investment community. UCLA Anderson Forecast provides forecasts for the economies of California and the United States. Its quarterly conferences are attended by business, professional, and government decision-makers from across the U.S. The Richard S. Ziman Center For Real Estate was established in 2002. UCLA Anderson also has a Center for International Business Education and Research, which was founded in 1989 as part of a network of 28 CIBERs created by the United States Omnibus Trade and Competitiveness Act of 1988.

The Center for Managing Enterprises in Media, Entertainment and Sports (MEMES) examines the forces of change on the management of enterprises in entertainment and media including the impacts of technology, consolidation, and globalization. The Center and its predecessors have been around since the late 1970s and have approximately 1,000 graduates in management positions in the media, entertainment, and technology industries. 150-200 MBA students each year participate in classes, lunches with executives, Days on the Job, field studies, speakers, and other activities with the Institute. The student-run organization linked to the MEMES Center is called the Entertainment Management Association (EMA).

== Alumni ==
The UCLA Anderson alumni network consists of 44,000 members in over 25 chapters in over 75 countries worldwide.

== Student life ==
Anderson has a strong focus on giving back to the community. One initiative on campus is "Challenge for Charity," a competition between West Coast business schools to put in the most volunteer hours per student and raise the most money for Special Olympics. Challenge for Charity (C4C) is a student-run organization.

== See also ==
- Economics
- FinancialAccess@Birth
- Glossary of economics
- List of United States business school rankings
- List of business schools in the United States
- Gerald Loeb Award
- Consortium for Graduate Study in Management
