= Shailesh Kumar (businessman) =

Indian businessman

- Education: M.B.A.
- Alma mater: University of Michigan
- Known for: Founder, Value Stock Guide
- Website: Shailesh Kumar on LinkedIn

Shailesh Kumar is an American writer, entrepreneur, and private investor. He is the founder of Value Stock Guide, a financial website that provides information about investing. As a writer, his articles from Value Stock Guide are syndicated with financial websites that include Seeking Alpha, Investing.com, and Nasdaq.com, with other articles appearing in Forbes and the Business Insider. He has been featured in The New York Times as well as other publications.

== Early life and education ==
Kumar attended the Indian Institute of Technology where he earned his undergraduate in Electrical Engineering. He went on to work for the Ford Motor company prior to pursuing his master's degree. He attended the University of Michigan where he earned his M.B.A. from the Ross School of Business.

== Career ==
Kumar's business career began with A.T. Kearney where he worked as a management consultant, advising Fortune 100 companies on business strategies. He later worked with an A.T. Kearney incubator in the Midwest, ending up as the chief financial officer for one of its startup companies. He went on to start his own career as an entrepreneur in the steel industry.

Kumar was a steel industry entrepreneur. His experience with owning a steel company was documented in a 2011 featured article in The New York Times. In 2008, Kumar went to borrow $350,000 in capital for the business. This was approximately nine months after making his initial purchase. The capital was to be used to pay off higher interest debt. Kumar was informed by two different banks that he would need to put his house up for collateral. During this time, the value of his house declined during the real estate market crash in the U.S. Lenders would not loan him money due to the value of his home being worth less than what he could put up for collateral. Kumar was unable to keep the business running due to declining revenue and no cash reserved. He closed the steel company in 2009.

Kumar is the founder of Value Stock Guide, a financial advice website he founded in 2011. He is a private investor who focuses primarily on long term value and smaller undervalued companies. He writes the content for the Value Stock Guide website which is syndicated with websites such as Seeking Alpha, Investing.com, and Nasdaq.com. He also manages a private portfolio that reflects the investment ideas he writes about on the site. Kumar's work in the field of finance has led to numerous media appearances, including giving the Pre Market Report for Benzinga. He is also a frequent contributor to financial publications which include the Business Insider, Seeking Alpha, and Forbes.
