= Aneesh Raman =

American journalist

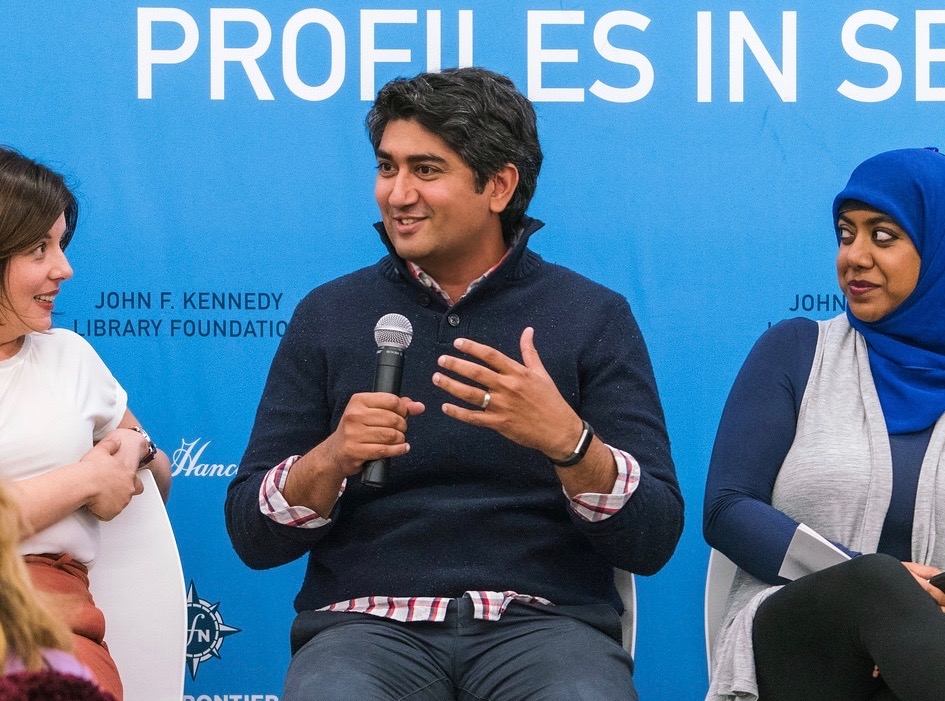
- Book Event for 'West Wingers' in Boston
- Education: Harvard College
- Occupations: Tech Executive; Policy Advisor; Speechwriter; Newscaster
- Spouse: Dr. Haley Naik

Aneesh Raman is Chief Economic Opportunity Officer at Microsoft, having previously held that same role at LinkedIn. A former CNN war correspondent and speechwriter to President Barack Obama, Raman has focused his career in recent years on the expansion of economic opportunity. He first wrote about that issue in a 2016 guest essay for Fortune Magazine. In 2026, he co-authored the New York Times Best Seller 'Open to Work: How to Get Ahead in the Age of AI' with Ryan Roslansky, published by HarperCollins.

A graduate of Harvard College and a former Fulbright scholar, Raman is a Board Member at College Futures Foundation and at Shanti Bhavan school. He is a former member of the John F. Kennedy Presidential Library's New Frontier Award Committee as well as a former term member at the Council on Foreign Relations.

== Focus on Economic Opportunity ==
At LinkedIn, Raman leads the effort to help shape the global response to the historic changes hitting work from artificial intelligence.

In February 2024, he co-authored an opinion piece for The New York Times entitled The AI Economy Will Make Jobs More Human. In May 2025, he authored another opinion piece for The New York Times entitled I'm a LinkedIn Executive. I See the Bottom Rung of the Career Ladder Breaking.

Prior to joining LinkedIn, Raman was a Senior Economic Advisor to California Governor Gavin Newsom and, before that, was Head of Economic Impact at Facebook. Raman also was VP of Growth at RaiseMe, a since acquired social impact startup expanding access to higher education.

== Open to Work ==
In 2026, Raman co-authored a book with Ryan Roslansky titled Open to Work: How to Get Ahead in the Age of AI, published by HarperCollins. The book focuses on helping people navigate their careers in the age of AI. It debuted as a New York Times best seller.

== Obama administration ==
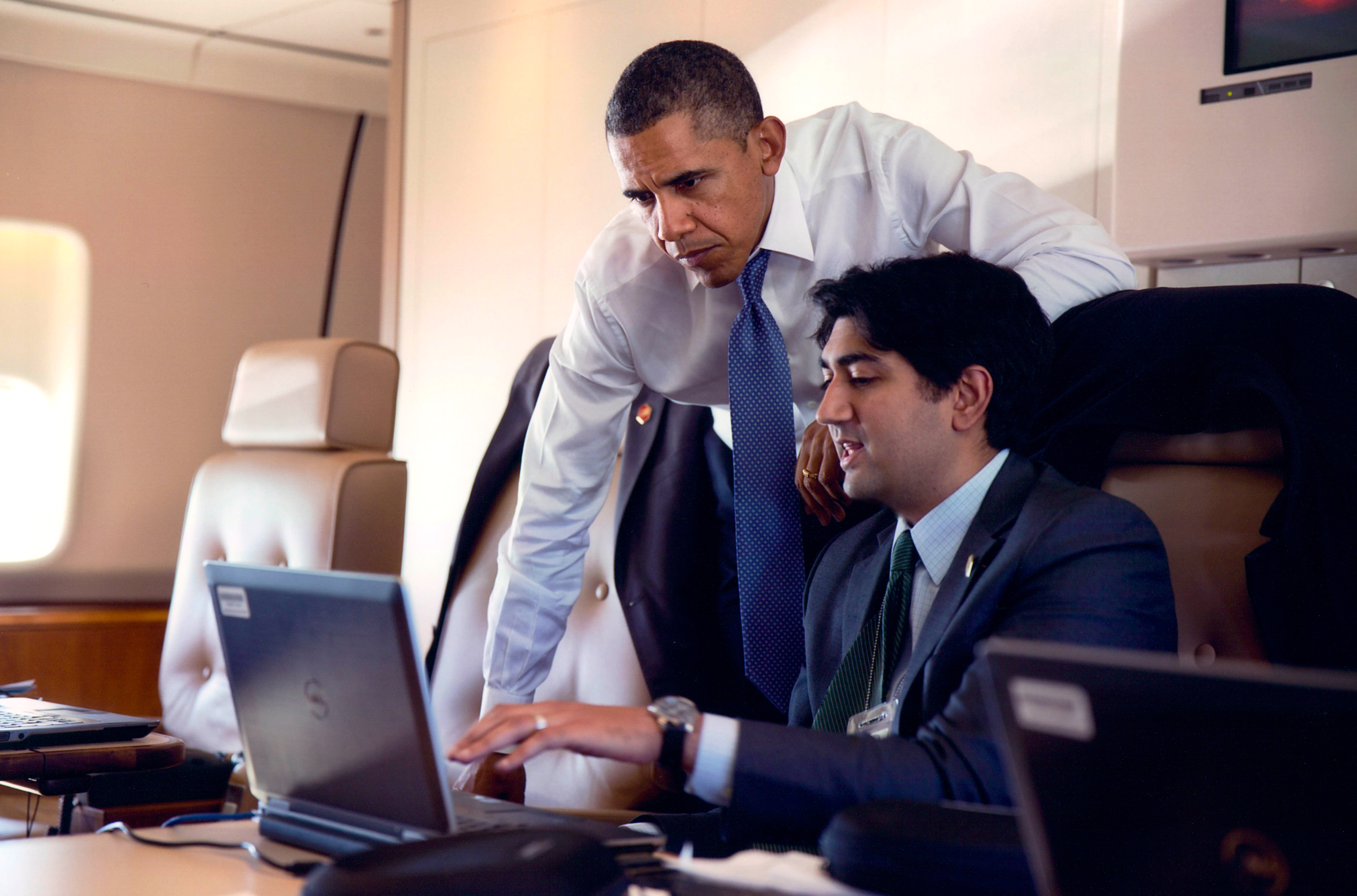

After joining the presidential campaign of Barack Obama as part of the communications team set up for vice presidential nominee Joe Biden, Raman became speechwriter to Treasury Secretary Timothy Geithner during the 2008 financial crisis and ensuing recession.

Raman subsequently worked on strategic communications at The Pentagon before joining the White House staff as the first Indian-American to be a Presidential Speechwriter Raman wrote about the experience as one of the contributing writers to the book West Wingers.

== CNN career ==
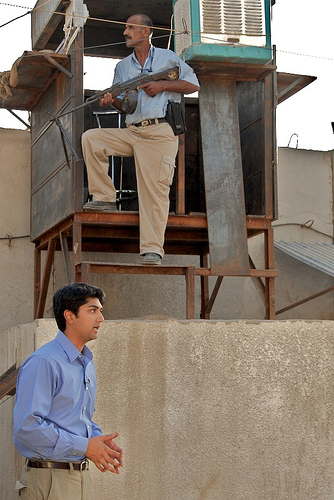

Raman was CNN’s first correspondent based in the Middle East responsible for region-wide coverage. At the time of his departure, Raman was based in Egypt but was largely responsible for coverage out of Iran. Over the course of a dozen trips, Raman reported extensively on Iran's nuclear ambitions and the growing frustration of the people towards their government.

From 2005 to 2006, Raman was CNN's Baghdad Correspondent, living in Iraq during an exceptionally volatile period in the Iraq War. In addition to embedding with US forces across the country, he provided some of the most comprehensive reporting on Iraq's National Assembly and the efforts to ratify a new constitution. Raman also provided in-depth coverage of the Saddam Hussein trial and was notably the first American television journalist to announce Saddam Hussein's execution. In 2014, Raman appeared on television a number of times to discuss the Islamic State of Iraq and the Levant's offensive in Iraq.

Raman's initial international posting was in Bangkok, Thailand, where he was the first Western reporter to go live from Phuket, Thailand after the 2004 Indian Ocean earthquake. Raman spent weeks covering the aftermath of the resulting tsunami and was part of the CNN team that won a 2005 Alfred I. duPont–Columbia University Award.

While at CNN, Raman reported from a number of countries including Iran, Iraq, Egypt, Lebanon, Syria, Saudi Arabia, Turkey, England, Spain, Nicaragua, India, Japan, Thailand, Cambodia, Singapore, Philippines and Indonesia. In July 2007, he gave a speech at the Clinton School of Public Service about his experiences as a foreign correspondent and the changes taking place in cable news. Raman first appeared on CNN in 2004, when he profiled the younger generation and their involvement in the American 2004 presidential election. In June 2008, Raman left CNN and later joined the U.S. presidential campaign of Democrat Barack Obama.

He began his television career while in college, earning a local Emmy Award for anchoring Kids Talk Sports, a weekly sports talk show that aired on New England Cable News.

== Personal life ==
Raman graduated from Harvard College magna cum laude and was a Fulbright Scholar. He grew up in Wellesley, Massachusetts and went to Wellesley High School.

Raman married Dr. Haley Naik in 2012 after they were introduced to one another by a mutual friend.
