= Federal Correctional Institution, Oakdale =

Prison in Oakdale, Louisiana, US

Coordinates: 30°49′26″N 92°38′26″W

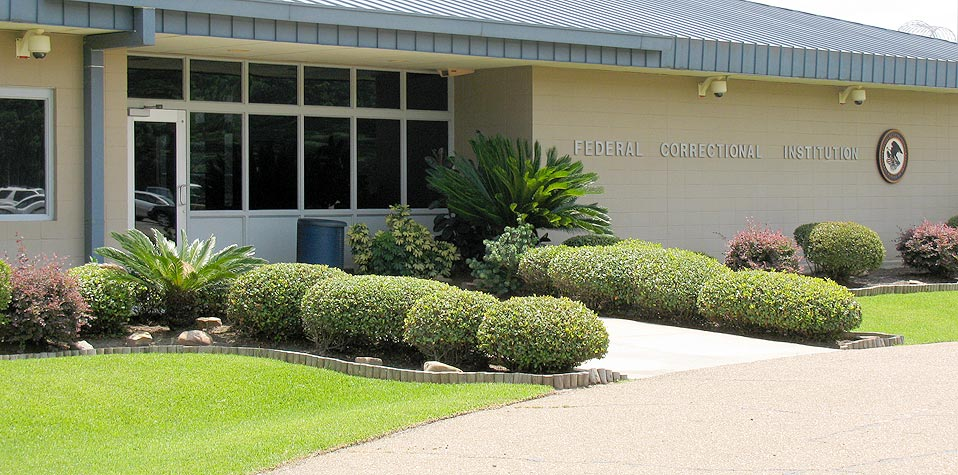
- FCI Oakdale I
- Interactive map of Federal Correctional Institution, Oakdale
- Location: Oakdale, Allen Parish, Louisiana
- Status: Operational
- Security class: Low-security
- Population: 1,700
- Managed by: Federal Bureau of Prisons
- Warden: Felipe Martinez

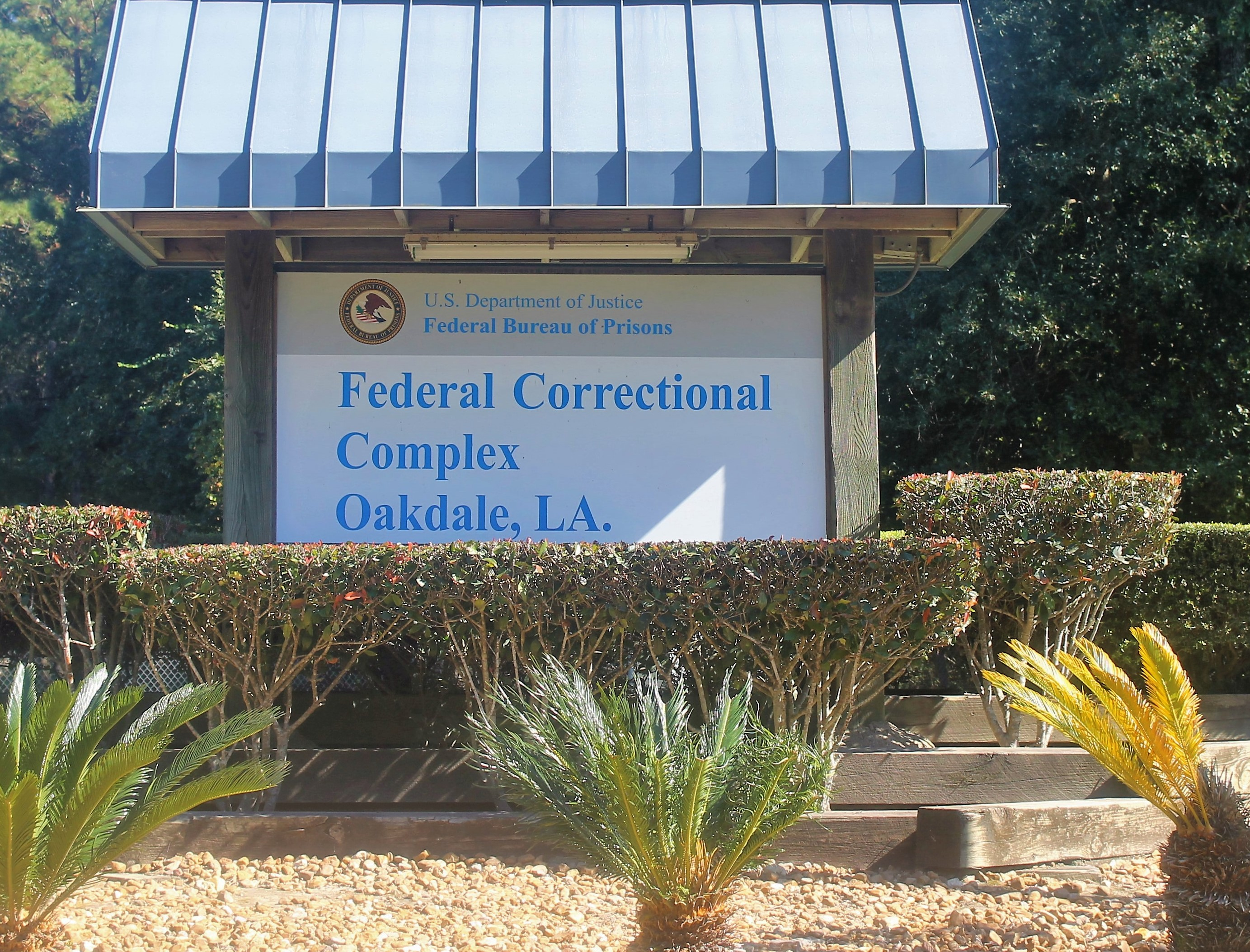
Entrance to the prison complex in Oakdale, Louisiana

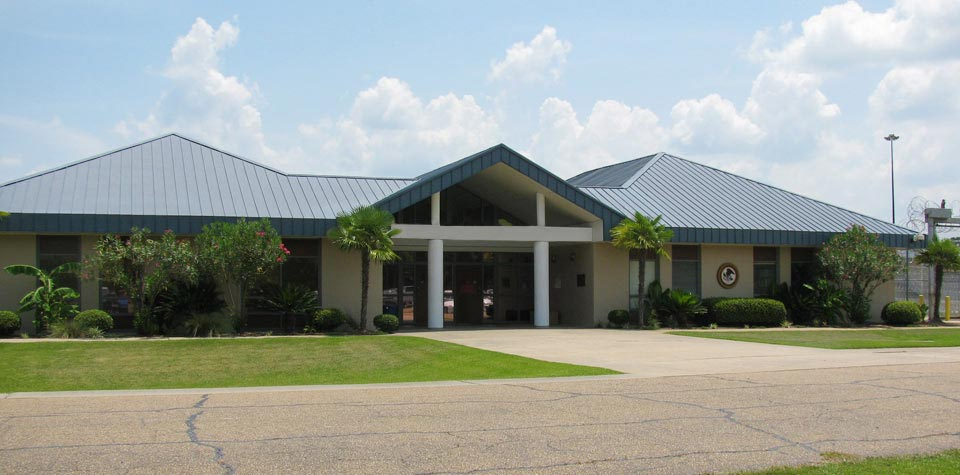
Entrance to FCI Oakdale II

The Federal Correctional Institution, Oakdale (FCI Oakdale) is a low-security United States federal prison for male inmates in Oakdale, Louisiana. It is part of the Oakdale Federal Correctional Complex (FCC) and operated by the Federal Bureau of Prisons, a division of the United States Department of Justice.

The complex consists of two facilities:

- Federal Correctional Institution, Oakdale (FCI Oakdale I): a low-security facility
- Federal Correctional Institution, Oakdale (FCI Oakdale II): a low-security facility

FCI Oakdale is located in central Louisiana, 35 miles (56 km) south of Alexandria and fifty-eight miles north of Lake Charles.

== Notable incidents ==
June 22, 2009, 29-year-old inmate Alberto Gallegos-Velazquez violently assaulted another inmate in the recreational yard at FCI Oakdale. The victim inmate, whom the Bureau of Prisons did not identify, suffered a fractured skull and an intracranial hemorrhage which resulted in long-term disabilities including seizures, loss of speech, and an inability to move his right extremities. Gallegos-Velazquez subsequently pleaded guilty to assault resulting in serious bodily injury. He was sentenced an additional fifty-one months in prison and ordered to pay more than $158,000 in restitution.

On April 6, 2020, the ACLU sued the Bureau of Prisons and FCI-Oakdale Warden Rodney Myers on behalf of incarcerated people. According to the ACLU, "The legal team seeks the release of people who are incarcerated and at high risk for serious injury or death in the event of COVID-19 infection due to age and/or underlying medical conditions." Days later, incarcerated people refused orders when staff attempted to move people who had been potentially exposed to the virus into housing units with no known cases. Authorities used "paintball guns to fire paintballs full of pepper spray at prisoners, as well as teargas, according to Vice News." As of February 23, 2021, at least eight incarcerated people at FCI-Oakdale had died from COVID-19.

== Notable inmates ==
Inmate name	Register number	Photo	Status	Details
Joaquin Valencia-Trujillo	02440-748		Scheduled for release April 12, 2036.	Former leader of the Cali Cartel in Colombia; extradited to the US in 2004; convicted in 2006 of drug trafficking conspiracy for directing the shipment of more than 100 tons of cocaine a year into the US over a ten-year period.
Kai Lundstroem Pedersen	76335-053		Scheduled for release March 27, 2036.	Danish man sentenced to 30 years in prison in 2012 for producing child pornography and extorting a minor.
Kwame Kilpatrick	44678-039		Was serving a 28-year sentence. On January 20, 2021, President Donald Trump commuted his sentence.	Former Mayor of Detroit. On March 11, 2013, he was convicted on 24 federal felony counts, including mail fraud, wire fraud, and racketeering. On October 10, 2013, Kilpatrick was sentenced to 28 years in federal prison.
Max Butler	09954-011		Was serving a 13-year sentence; released from custody on April 14, 2021.	Computer hacker; pleaded guilty in 2009 to wire fraud for stealing credit card information from 2 million customers, which was used in $86 million fraudulent charges; received the longest sentence for computer hacking in US history.
Yevgeniy Nikulin	24827-111		Serving an 88-month sentence; released on February 24, 2023.	Computer Hacker arrested in Prague in 2016 for the 2012 LinkedIn hack.
Bernard Ebbers	56022-054		Deceased; began a 25-year sentence here in 2006, later transferred to FMC Fort Worth, where he was released early on compassionate grounds after serving 13 years, and died about a month later.	Former CEO of Worldcom; convicted in 2005 of orchestrating an $11 billion accounting fraud that brought down the telecommunications company in 2002.
Edwin Edwards	03128-095		Released from custody in 2011; served 10 years.	Four-term Governor of Louisiana; convicted in 2000 of racketeering, conspiracy and extortion for demanding hundreds of thousands of dollars from businessmen applying for riverboat casino licenses from 1991 through 1997.
Andrew Fastow	14343-179		Released from custody in 2011; served 5 years.	Former Chief Financial Officer of Enron; pleaded guilty to wire fraud and securities fraud in 2004 for his role in the company's 2001 collapse.
William J. Jefferson	72121-083		Originally received a 13-year sentence; resentenced to credit for time served in 2017.	Louisiana Congressman from 1991 to 2009; convicted in 2009 of bribery, racketeering and money laundering for using his influence to promote the interests of international companies in exchange for $400,000 in bribes.
Shannon Kepler	14007-509		Serving a 25-year sentence; scheduled for release in 2039.	Killed his daughter's boyfriend, Jeremey Lake, in 2014. The murder drew attention over allegations it was racially motivation.
Paul Schlesselman	22539-076		Released in 2017.	White supremacist; pleaded guilty in 2010 to plotting the assassination of then-Presidential nominee Barack Obama in 2008; co-conspirator Daniel Cowart was sentenced to 14 years.
Don Siegelman	24775-001		Served a 6-year sentence; released in 2017.	Governor of Alabama from 1999 to 2003; convicted in 2006 of conspiracy, bribery, and obstruction of justice for naming HealthSouth CEO Richard Scrushy to a state health planning board in return for a $500,000 campaign contribution.
Justin Solondz	98291-011		Released in 2017; served 7 years.	Member of the group Earth Liberation Front; pleaded guilty to conspiracy and arson for planning and executing the University of Washington firebombing incident.

== See also ==
- List of U.S. federal prisons
- Federal Bureau of Prisons
- Incarceration in the United States
