= Sribu =

Company of Indonesia

Sribu.com
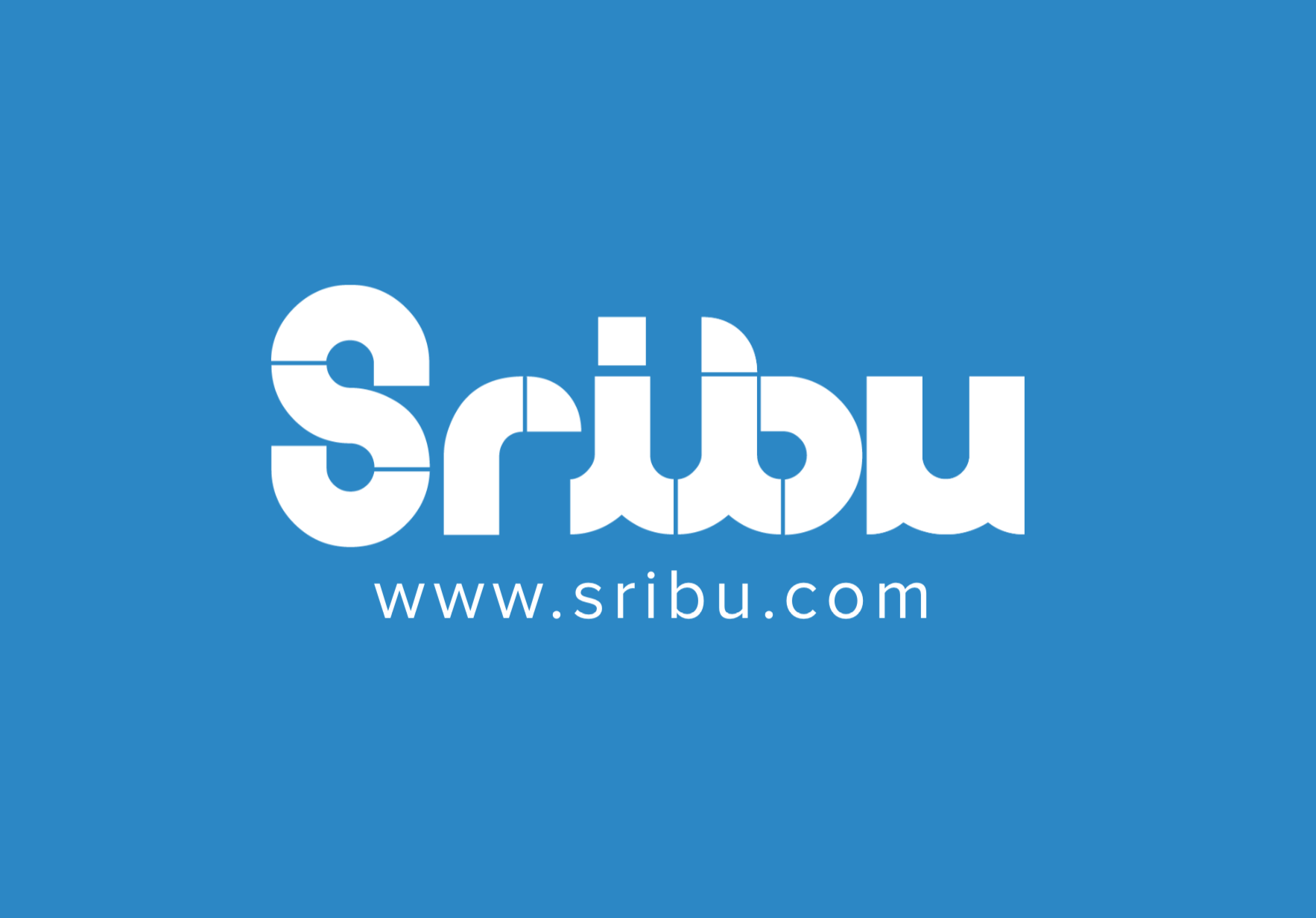
- Company type: Online marketplace
- Industry: online marketplace, freelance marketplace, online outsourcing, digital marketing agency
- Founded: PT Digital Sribu Kreatif: September 2011
- Founder: Ryan Gondokusumo
- Headquarters: Ruko ITC Permata Hijau. Blok Diamond 3, South Jakarta, Jakarta, Indonesia
- Area served: worldwide
- Owner: Mynavi, Crowdworks. Ryan Gondokusumo
- Website: www.sribu.com

Sribu.com is an Indonesia-based online marketplace for freelance services that connects businesses with curated freelancers across creative, marketing, and technology categories. Founded in 2011 and headquartered in Jakarta, the company began as a crowdsourced design marketplace and later expanded through Sribulancer, a product for project-based freelance work.

== History ==
Sribu was founded in September 2011 by Ryan Gondokusumo as a design-crowdsourcing platform serving Indonesian businesses. In February 2012, the company raised seed funding from East Ventures to accelerate its early growth.

In February 2014, Sribu secured a Series A round from Japan-listed software company Infoteria Corporation (later renamed Asteria Corporation), which acquired approximately 34.5 percent of Sribu’s equity.

In November 2017, CrowdWorks, Inc.—Japan's crowdsourcing platforms—invested strategically in Sribu to strengthen regional expansion into Southeast Asia.

To serve broader, project-based needs beyond design contests, Sribu launched Sribulancer in 2014–2015, expanding into services such as web development, content writing, translation, and social-media management.

On 13 December 2021, Sribu was acquired by Mynavi Corporation. The acquisition was officially announced in March–April 2022 and was positioned to leverage Mynavi’s network while strengthening Sribu’s technology and market presence in Indonesia.

In June 2023, Sribu merged Sribulancer into Sribu.com, unifying both platforms under a single brand to streamline user experience and consolidate the freelancer ecosystem.

== Product & Services ==
- Sribu (Contest & Managed Services): Originally launched as a design contest platform, Sribu has evolved into a full-service digital marketplace offering a wide range of business services, including branding, social media management, advertising, and digital marketing.
- Sribulancer (Project Marketplace): Previously operating as a separate platform for directly hiring freelancers on a project basis—such as programming, content writing, design, and translation—Sribulancer was merged into Sribu.com in 2023 to unify the freelancer ecosystem under a single integrated platform.
- Service Models (as of 2025):
  - Design Contest: Businesses can launch creative contests and select the best submissions from multiple participants.
  - Freelancer Marketplace (Direct Services): Clients can directly hire freelancers for specific tasks based on their needs.
  - JobPost / Project Posting: Businesses can post detailed project requirements, and freelancers apply competitively to deliver the work.

== Funding and ownership ==
Year	Round	Investor / Partner	Notes
2012	Seed	East Ventures	Initial capital for growth
2014	Series A	Asteria Corporation (formerly Infoteria)	~34.5 % stake
2017	Strategic Investment	CrowdWorks, Inc.	Regional partnership
2021 (ann. 2022)	Acquisition	Mynavi Corporation	Full ownership

== Leadership ==
As of 2025, Sribu’s executive leadership includes:

- Ryan Gondokusumo — Founder and chief executive officer (CEO)
- Alexandro Endy Wibowo — Chief operating officer (COO, formerly as CMO)

Other C-level positions (COO, CFO) have not been publicly disclosed as of 2025.

== Events and initiatives ==
=== Sribu Media Day ===
Sribu Media Day is a recurring corporate event designed to showcase the company’s vision, brand milestones, and product launches held by Sribu.

- October 2024 — Held at CGV Grand Indonesia, the event introduced the #SribuinAja national campaign and the Sribu mobile app.
- August 2025 — Hosted at CGV FX Sudirman Jakarta under the theme Sribu & The Quest for Cuan, highlighting freelancer success stories and Sribu’s support for business growth.

=== SRIBUFEST ===
SRIBUFEST is Sribu’s annual festival for freelancers and clients, celebrating the Indonesian freelance community.

- December 2024 — Held at Superhouse Satrio, Jakarta, under the theme Freelance Revolution, featuring entertainment, networking sessions, live music (by RAN), and the Sribu Talent Awards recognizing top freelancers. The festival is planned as an annual event to strengthen community engagement.
- December 2025 — Held at CGV Grand Indonesia in Jakarta with the theme Survive & Thrive. SRIBUFEST 2025 returned as an annual celebration designed to help freelancers navigate challenges and grow in a competitive creative landscape. The event included expert talks and strategy sessions from creators such as Benakribo, Aryo Pamungkas, Michelle Yap, Nury Zhafira and the Sribu Talent Awards recognizing outstanding freelance achievers. Sribu described the festival as a space for freelancers to build resilience, gain actionable insights, and strengthen professional networks.

== Cultural impact ==
In July 2025, Sribu organized a nationwide public logo design contest to celebrate Indonesia’s upcoming 80th Independence Anniversary (HUT RI ke-80). The initiative was widely noted as a subtle critique of the government’s own official logo contest, which had been launched earlier in May 2025 but had yet to announce a winner even as Independence Day approached. Sribu opened the competition to the public for just ten days and successfully selected a winner through open public voting.

The contest attracted hundreds of submissions from freelance designers, students, and micro-entrepreneurs across Indonesia. Media outlets highlighted the campaign as both a celebration of national creativity and a symbolic statement about the agility of Indonesia’s freelance ecosystem when compared with slower institutional initiatives. The winning logo was announced and published publicly before 17 August 2025.

== Awards ==
- Marketeers' Do Good Marketing Award 2026: Ramadan Tanpa Drama campaign.
- Marketeers' Editors Choice Award 2025: Multichannel Corporate Branding of the Year.
- Marketeers Youth Choice Award 2025: Recognition for empowering Gen-Z freelancers through the Future of Work initiative.
- Indonesia ICT Awards 2013
- SparxUp Award 2011

== See also ==
- Shiftgig
