= Eric Ly =

Vietnamese-born Chinese-American entrepreneur and investor; co-founder of LinkedIn

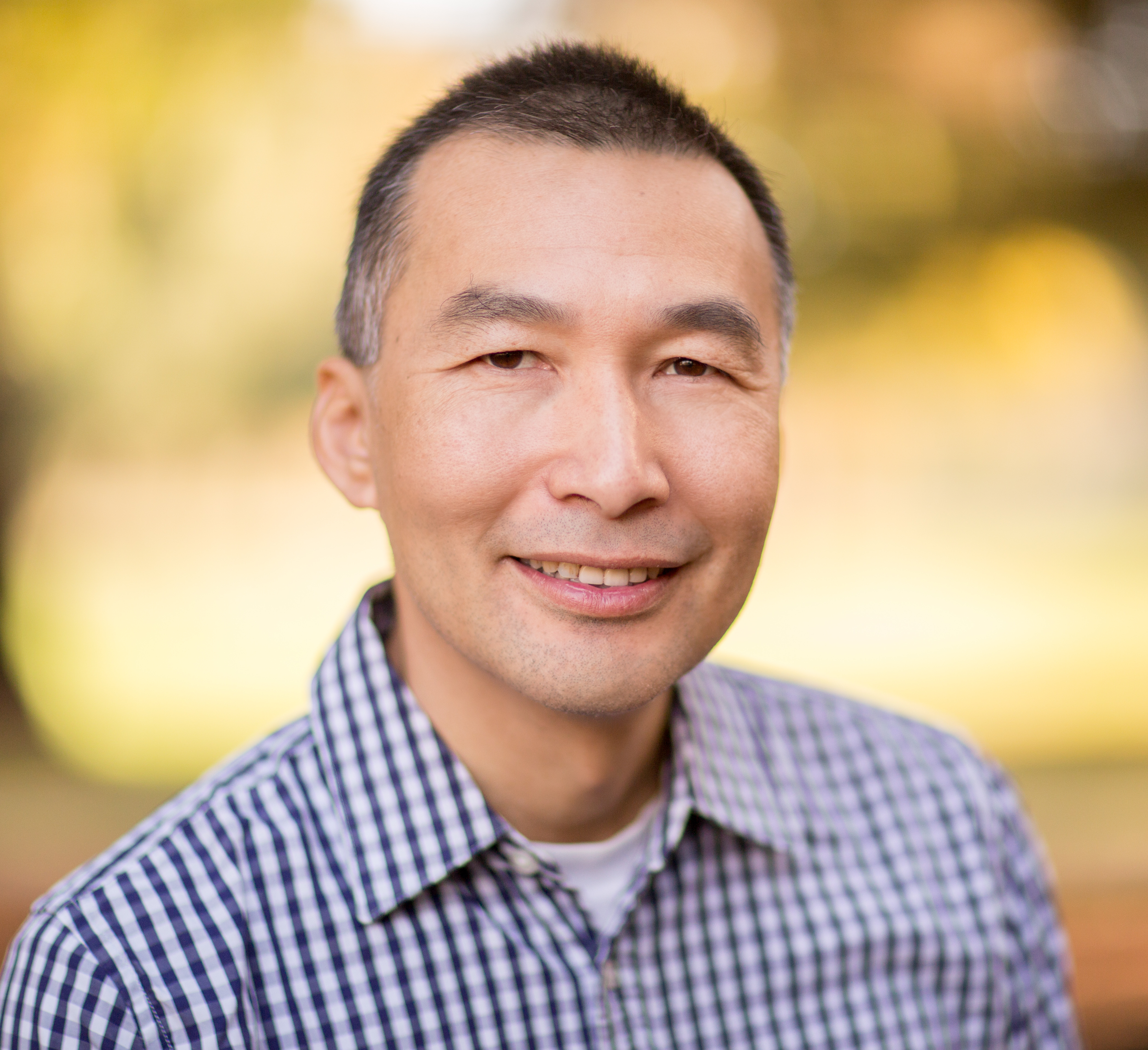
- Eric Ly
- Born: Thich Vi Ly; January 15, 1969 (age 57); Saigon, South Vietnam
- Education: Stanford University (BS); Massachusetts Institute of Technology (MS)
- Occupations: Technologist, Investor
- Known for: Co-founding LinkedIn
- Title: Founder, CEO, presdo

Eric Thich Vi Ly (born January 15, 1969) is a Vietnamese-American entrepreneur and investor. Ly was co-founder of LinkedIn, a social networking site designed specifically for the business community, where he served as its founding chief technology officer.

He is currently the CEO and founder of a blockchain based trust protocol Hub, as well as the CEO and co-founder of KarmaCheck providing candidate's background checks.

== Early life and education ==
Ly was born in Saigon, Vietnam, and emigrated to the United States in 1975 as a result of the Vietnam War. He lived in San Francisco, California, for some years, and when his parents found jobs in Silicon Valley, his family moved to Sunnyvale, California.

Ly attended Homestead High School, where he applied his interest in computers to journalism and the on-campus newspaper, The Epitaph. Through a sponsorship from Apple Inc., he transformed production methods for the publication, making Homestead one of the first schools in the country to use desktop publishing technology to publish its newspaper on the newly introduced Macintosh computers.

Ly attended Stanford University and volunteered as a science writer for the Stanford Daily in addition to his studies. Ly was inspired by professor Terry Winograd's perspective that computers ultimately serve as communications tools for people. Ly graduated with distinction in 1991 with a Bachelor of Science in Symbolic Systems and as a member of Phi Beta Kappa society. His contemporaries included Scott Forstall, Reid Hoffman, and Marissa Mayer.

Ly went on to earn a Master of Science in Media Arts and Sciences from the MIT Media Lab in 1993 with a research thesis ("Chatter: A Conversational Telephone Agent") on combining speech-user interfaces and artificial-intelligence agents. Ly returned to Stanford University to get his PhD in Computer Science but he would later drop out of the program.

== Career ==
=== Early years ===
Ly started his professional career in technical positions at Steve Jobs' NeXT (acquired by Apple Inc.), IBM, Sun Microsystems (acquired by Oracle), and General Magic.

In 1995, Ly co-founded Netmosphere, a software company enabling project management collaboration utilizing Internet technologies such as Java. Menlo Ventures invested in the firm, which was subsequently acquired by Critical Path, Inc. In 2000, Ly co-founded a mobile software company called Tresidder Networks in which Industry Ventures invested.

=== LinkedIn ===
In 2002, Ly co-founded LinkedIn with Reid Hoffman, a Stanford schoolmate, and several other co-founders, including Jean-Luc Vaillant, Allen Blue, and Konstantin Guericke. When Microsoft acquired LinkedIn in 2016 for $26.2B, it was the world's "largest social networking site focused on the working world" with more than 400 million registered users.

As LinkedIn's founding CTO, Ly "helped create some of its core product features, which enabled the company to reach profitability and a quickly growing user base."

=== Wellington Partners ===
From 2008 to 2011, Ly served as a venture partner for Wellington Partners, a Munich, Germany-based venture capital firm whose investments include Xing and Spotify.

=== Current projects ===
In 2007, Ly launched Presdo with $35,000 (~$52,279 in 2025) of his own money. The company first built a meeting scheduler chatbot described as "pure, refined, focused, with a fairly deep understanding of how real people, not just 'users,' think, act and want from their online apps." On the suggestion of Loic Le Meur and others, Ly was persuaded to adapt the meeting scheduler to conferences where it could help attendees arrange face-to-face meetings. The technology evolved into a mobile app called Presdo Match, "that facilitates networking" and "provides a searchable directory of attendee profiles (imported from LinkedIn when desirable), makes connection recommendations, and highlights which contacts from existing networks are in attendance so users can send messages and schedule meetings with other attendees." Presdo Match was launched in 2010 at the LeWeb conference, "the biggest European Internet conference." Ly subsequently expanded his marketing efforts for Presdo Match globally.

Ly is currently the CEO and founder of a blockchain based trust protocol Hub, as well as the CEO and co-founder of KarmaCheck, a company providing candidate's background checks.

== Speaking ==
Ly has spoken at many event-industry conferences on the topic of social technology and its role in live events, including The Meetings Technology Expo, Web Summit, Expo! Expo!, and the Society of Independent Show Organizer's CEO Summit.
