= LinkedIn =

Professional network website

LinkedIn Corporation
- Logo used since September 2021
- Company type: Subsidiary
- Website type: Professional network service; Social media
- Available in: 36 languages
- List of languages Arabic, Bengali, Chinese (simplified), Chinese (traditional), Czech, Danish, Dutch, English (UK), English (US), Farsi, French, Finnish, German, Greek, Hebrew, Hindi, Hungarian, Indonesian, Italian, Japanese, Korean, Marathi, Malay, Norwegian, Polish, Portuguese, Romanian, Russian, Spanish, Swedish, Tagalog, Telugu, Thai, Turkish, Ukrainian, Vietnamese
- Founded: December 10, 2002; 23 years ago Mountain View, California, U.S.
- Headquarters: Sunnyvale, California, U.S.
- Area served: Worldwide
- Founders: Reid Hoffman; Eric Ly
- Key people: Jeff Weiner (Executive Chairman); Daniel Shapero (CEO)
- Industry: Internet
- Revenue: c. US$19.8 billion (FY2026)
- Employees: 18,500 (2024)
- Parent: Microsoft (2016–present)
- Subsidiaries: LinkedIn Learning; Connectifier; Drawbridge; Glint
- Website: linkedin.com
- IPv6 support: Yes
- Advertising: AdSense
- Registration: Required
- Users: 310 million MAU (Self-claimed, February 2023)
- Launched: May 5, 2003; 23 years ago
- Current status: Active

LinkedIn is an American business and employment-oriented social networking service by Microsoft. The platform is primarily used for professional networking and career development, as it allows job seekers to post their CVs and employers to post their job listings. It was launched on May 5, 2003, by Reid Hoffman and Eric Ly, receiving financing from numerous venture capital firms, including Sequoia Capital, in the years following its inception. Users can invite other people to become connections on the platform, regardless of whether the invitees are already members of LinkedIn. As the platform grew, its use expanded beyond recruiting into a primary channel for professional visibility and authority-building among entrepreneurs and business leaders. LinkedIn can also be used to organize offline events, create and join groups, write articles, and post photos and videos.

By early 2026, LinkedIn had more than 1.3 billion registered members. It was available in over 200 countries and territories.

In 2007, there were 10 million users on the platform, which urged LinkedIn to open offices around the world, including India, Australia and Ireland. In October 2010, LinkedIn was ranked No. 10 on the Silicon Valley Insider's Top 100 List of most valuable startups. From 2015, most of the company's revenue came from selling access to information about its members to recruiters and sales professionals; LinkedIn also introduced its own ad portal named LinkedIn Ads to let companies advertise in its platform. In December 2016, Microsoft purchased LinkedIn for $26.2 billion, being its largest acquisition at the time. 94% of business-to-business marketers since 2017 have used LinkedIn to distribute their content.

LinkedIn has been subject to criticism over its design choices, such as its endorsement feature and its use of members' e-mail accounts to send spam mail. Due to LinkedIn's poor security practices, several incidents have occurred with the website, including in 2012, when the cryptographic hashes of approximately 6.4 million users were stolen and published online; and in 2016, when 117 million LinkedIn usernames and passwords (likely sourced from the 2012 hack) were offered for sale. The platform has also been criticized for its poor handling of misinformation and disinformation, particularly pertaining to the COVID-19 pandemic and to the 2020 US presidential election. Various countries have placed bans or restrictions on LinkedIn: it was banned in Russia in 2016, Kazakhstan in 2021, and China in 2023.

== Company overview ==
Founded and headquartered in Mountain View, California, LinkedIn has 36 global offices as of February 11, 2024. In February 2024, the company had around 18,500 employees.

LinkedIn's current CEO is Daniel Shapero, who succeeded Ryan Roslansky in April 2026. Jeff Weiner, previously CEO of LinkedIn, is now serving as the Executive Chairman. Reid Hoffman, founder of LinkedIn, is chairman of the board. It was funded by Sequoia Capital, Greylock, Bain Capital Ventures, Bessemer Venture Partners and the European Founders Fund. LinkedIn reached profitability in March 2006. Since January 2011, the company had received a total of $103 million (about $145 million in 2025) of investment. LinkedIn filed for an initial public offering in January 2011 and traded its first shares in May, under the NYSE symbol "LNKD".

== History ==
=== Founding from 2002 to 2011 ===
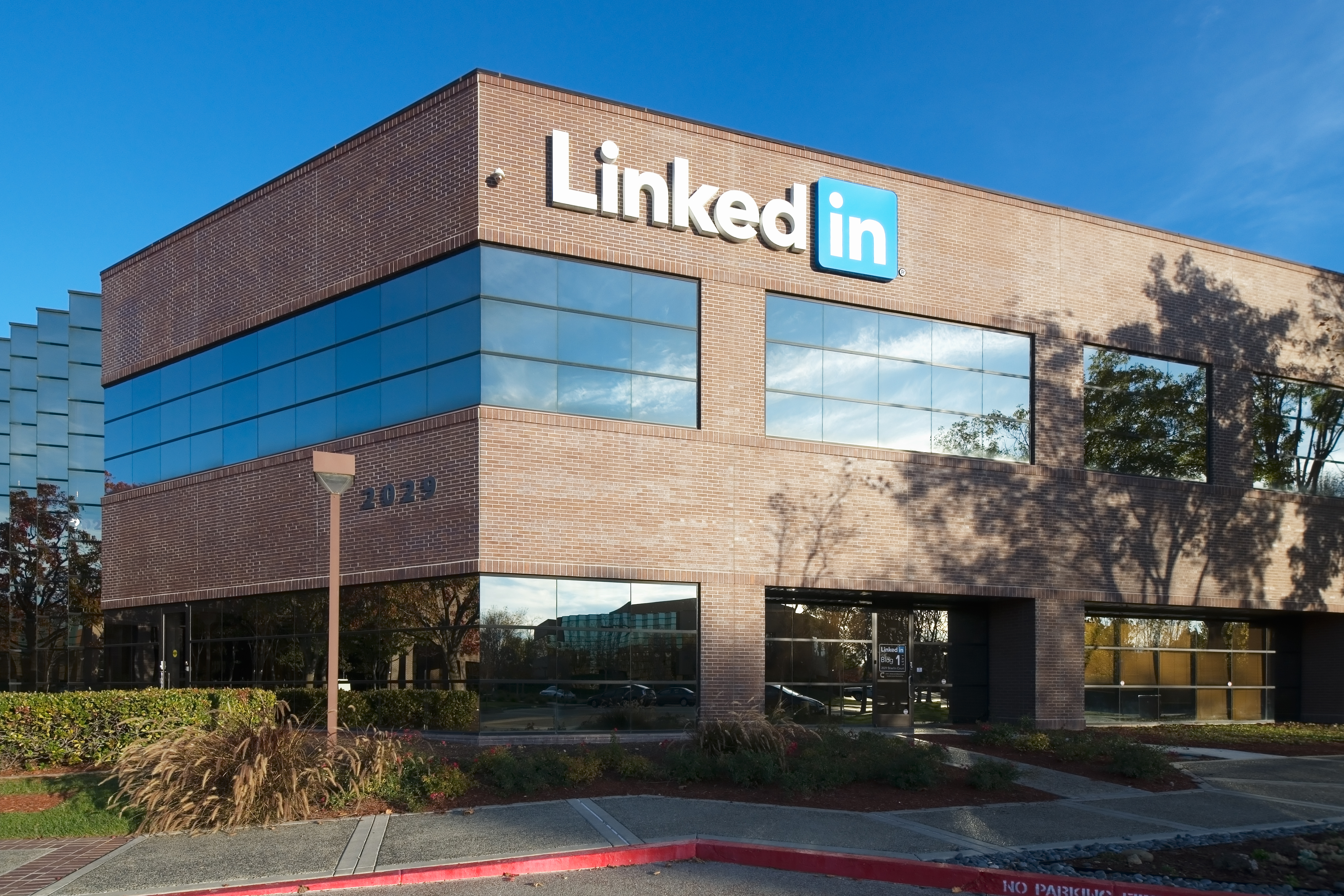
Former LinkedIn headquarters on Stierlin Court in Mountain View, California

The company was founded in December 2002 by Reid Hoffman and the founding team members from PayPal and Socialnet.com (Allen Blue, Eric Ly, Jean-Luc Vaillant, Lee Hower, Konstantin Guericke, Stephen Beitzel, David Eves, Ian McNish, Yan Pujante, Chris Saccheri). In late 2003, Sequoia Capital led the Series A investment in the company. In August 2004, LinkedIn reached 1 million users. In March 2006, LinkedIn achieved its first month of profitability. In April 2007, LinkedIn reached 10 million users. In February 2008, LinkedIn launched a mobile version of the site.

In June 2008, Sequoia Capital, Greylock Partners, and other venture capital firms purchased a 5% stake in the company for $53 million, giving the company a post-money valuation of approximately $1 billion. In November 2009, LinkedIn opened its office in Mumbai and soon thereafter in Sydney, as it started its Asia-Pacific team expansion. In 2010, LinkedIn opened an International Headquarters in Dublin, Ireland, received a $20 million investment from Tiger Global Management LLC at a valuation of approximately $2 billion, announced its first acquisition, Mspoke, and improved its 1% premium subscription ratio. In October of that year, Silicon Valley Insider ranked the company No. 10 on its Top 100 List of most valuable startups. By December, the company was valued at $1.575 billion in private markets. LinkedIn started its India operations in 2009 and a major part of the first year was dedicated to understanding professionals in India and educating members to leverage LinkedIn for career development.

=== 2011 to present ===
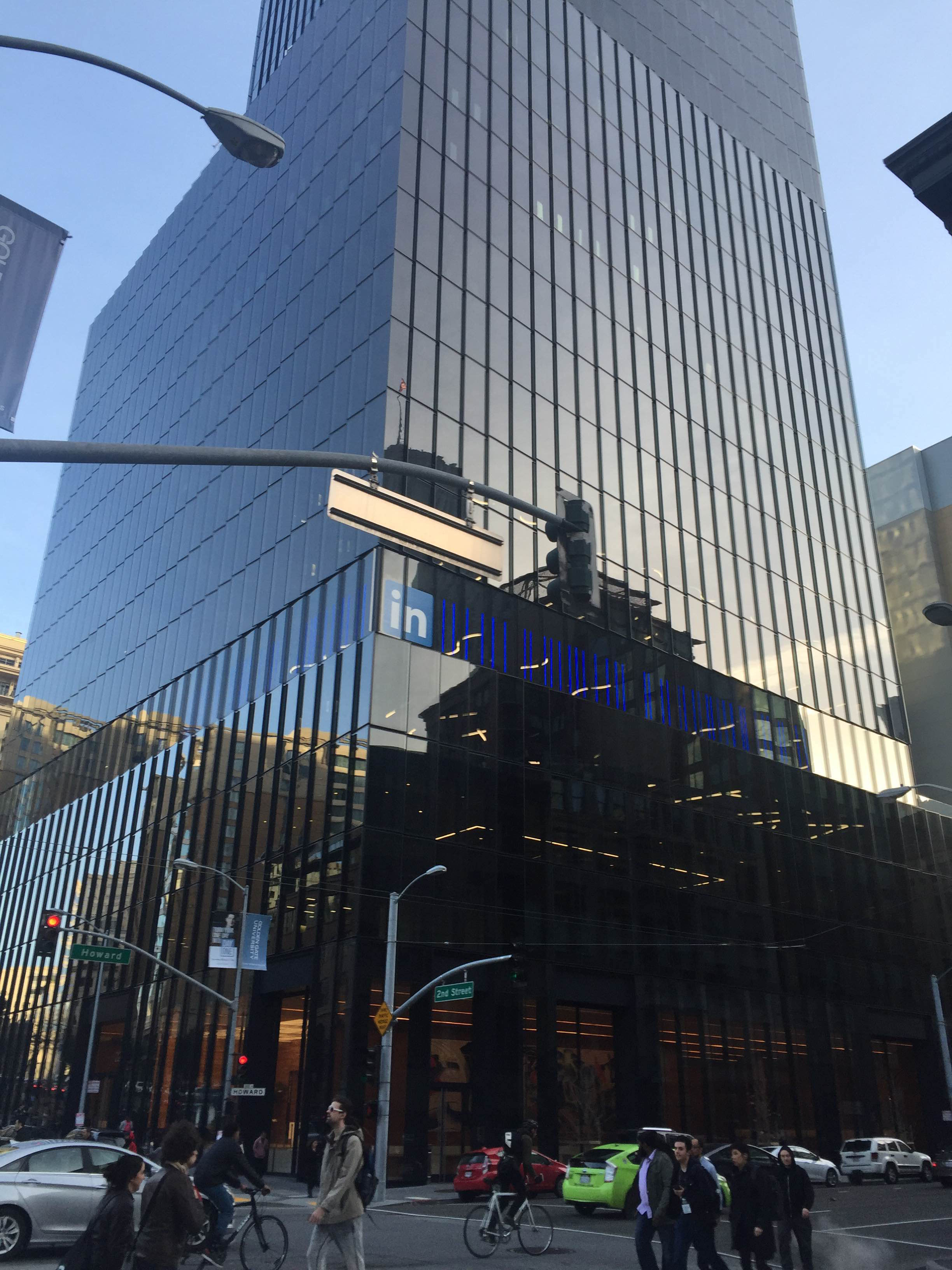
LinkedIn office building at 222 Second Street in San Francisco (opened in March 2016)

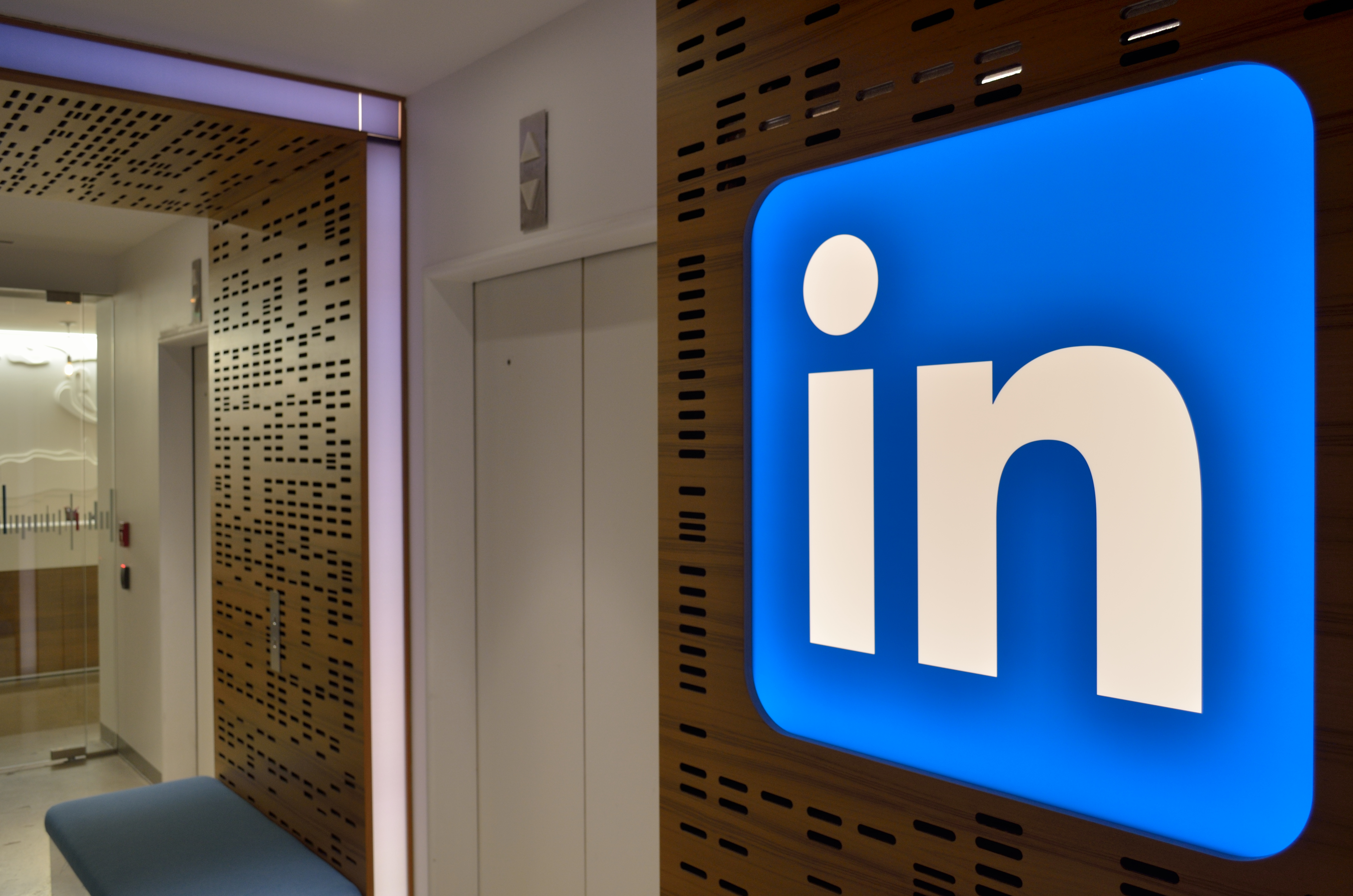
LinkedIn office in Toronto inside the Toronto Eaton Centre

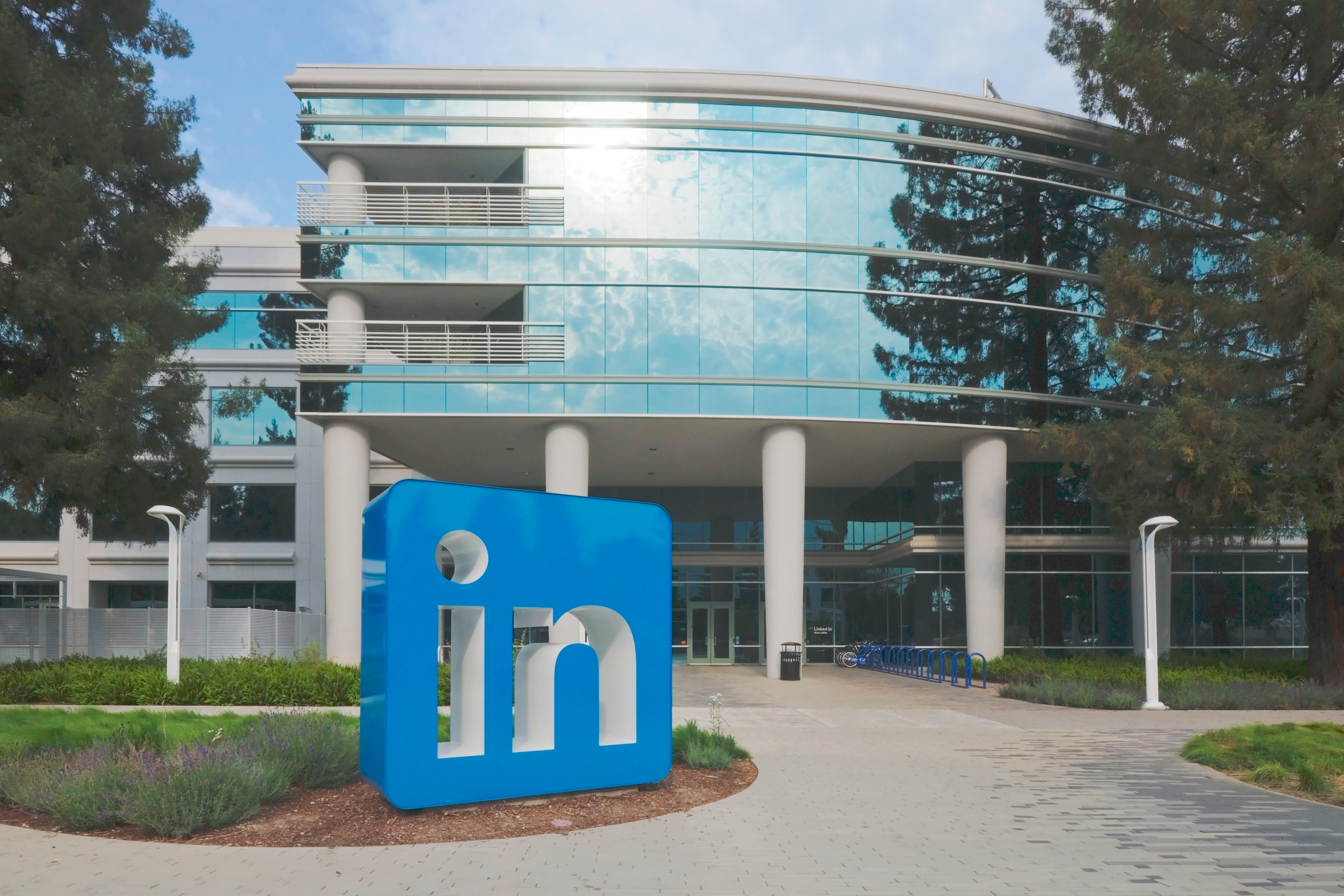
LinkedIn headquarters in Sunnyvale, California

LinkedIn filed for an initial public offering in January 2011. The company traded its first shares on May 19, 2011, under the NYSE symbol "LNKD", at $45 (≈$63.00 in 2025) per share. Shares of LinkedIn rose as much as 171% on their first day of trade on the New York Stock Exchange and closed at $94.25, more than 109% above IPO price. Shortly after the IPO, the site's underlying infrastructure was revised to allow accelerated revision-release cycles. In 2011, LinkedIn earned $154.6 million in advertising revenue alone, surpassing Twitter, which earned $139.5 million. LinkedIn's fourth-quarter 2011, earnings soared because of the company's increase in success in the social media world. By this point, LinkedIn had about 2,100 full-time employees compared to the 500 that it had in 2010.

In April 2014, LinkedIn announced that it had leased 222 Second Street, a 26-story building under construction in San Francisco's SoMa district, to accommodate up to 2,500 of its employees, with the lease covering 10 years. The goal was to join all San Francisco-based staff (1,250 as of January 2016) in one building, bringing sales and marketing employees together with the research and development team. In March 2016 they started to move in. In February 2016 following an earnings report, LinkedIn's shares dropped 43.6% within a single day, down to $108.38 per share. LinkedIn lost $10 billion of its market capitalization that day.

In 2016, access to LinkedIn was blocked by Russian authorities for non-compliance with the 2015 national legislation that requires social media networks to store citizens' personal data on servers located in Russia.

In June 2016, Microsoft announced that it would acquire LinkedIn for $196 a share, a total value of $26.2 billion. It was the largest acquisition made by Microsoft, until the acquisition of Activision Blizzard in 2022. The acquisition would be an all-cash, debt-financed transaction. Microsoft would allow LinkedIn to "retain its distinct brand, culture and independence", with Weiner to remain as CEO, who would then report to Microsoft CEO Satya Nadella. Analysts believed Microsoft saw the opportunity to integrate LinkedIn with its Office product suite to help better integrate the professional network system with its products. The deal was completed on December 8, 2016.

In late 2016, LinkedIn announced a planned increase of 200 new positions in its Dublin office, which would bring the total employee count to 1,200. Since 2017 94% of B2B marketers use LinkedIn to distribute content.

Soon after LinkedIn's acquisition by Microsoft, LinkedIn's new desktop version was introduced. The new version was meant to make the user experience similar across mobile and desktop. Some changes were made according to the feedback received from the previously launched mobile app. Features that were not heavily used were removed. For example, the contact tagging and filtering features are not supported anymore.

Following the launch of the new user interface (UI), some users complained about the missing features which were there in the older version, slowness, and bugs in it. The issues were faced by free and premium users and with both the desktop and mobile versions of the site.

In 2019, LinkedIn launched globally the feature Open for Business that enables freelancers to be discovered on the platform. LinkedIn Events was launched in the same year.

In June 2020, Jeff Weiner stepped down as CEO and became executive chairman after 11 years in the role. Ryan Roslansky stepped up as CEO from his previous position as the senior vice president of product. In late July 2020, LinkedIn announced it laid off 960 employees, about 6 percent of the total workforce, from the talent acquisition and global sales teams. In an email to all employees, CEO Ryan Roslansky said the cuts were due to effects of the global COVID-19 pandemic. In April 2021, CyberNews claimed that 500 million LinkedIn's accounts have leaked online. However, LinkedIn stated that "We have investigated an alleged set of LinkedIn data that has been posted for sale and have determined that it is actually an aggregation of data from a number of websites and companies".

In June 2021, PrivacySharks claimed that more than 700 million LinkedIn records were on sale on a hacker forum. LinkedIn later stated that this is not a breach, but scraped data which is also a violation of its Terms of Service.

In Sep 2021, LinkedIn blocks U.S. journalists' profiles in China. Includes but is not limited to Bethany Allen-Ebrahimian, Melissa Chan, Greg Bruno, Jojje Olsson, J Michael Cole.

Microsoft ended LinkedIn operations in China in October 2021.

In 2022, LinkedIn earned $13.8 billion in revenue, compared to $10.3 billion in 2021.

In May 2023, LinkedIn cut 716 positions from its 20,000 workforce. The move, according to a letter from the company's CEO Ryan Roslansky, was made to streamline the business's operations. Roslansky further stated that this decision would result in the creation of 250 job opportunities. Additionally, LinkedIn also announced the discontinuance of its China local job apps.

In June 2024, Axios reported LinkedIn was testing a new AI assistant for its paid Premium users.

In September 2024, LinkedIn suspended its use of UK user data for AI model training after concerns were raised by the Information Commissioner's Office (ICO). The platform had quietly opted in users globally for data use in AI training. However, following ICO feedback, LinkedIn paused this practice for UK users. A company spokesperson stated that LinkedIn has always allowed users to control how their data is used and has now provided UK users with an opt-out option.

In November 2024, Linkedin challenged Australian legislation which sought to ban under-16's from social media platforms on the grounds that it does 'not have content interesting and appealing to minors.'

In October 2025, the LinkedIn Learning Career Hub was launched.

In May 2026, LinkedIn introduced an agency certification initiative intended to help advertisers identify firms with experience using the platform's advertising and campaign tools. That same month, Amazon Ads and LinkedIn announced a collaboration allowing advertisers to use LinkedIn audience data for targeted connected TV advertising through Amazon DSP.

In June 2026, LinkedIn launched a creator marketplace that allows businesses to identify, evaluate, and connect with content creators specializing in professional and business-related topics.

In July 2026, LinkedIn introduced a 'Seems like AI slop' reporting function, allowing users to flag posts that appeared to be low-quality or AI-generated. Previously, the platform allowed users to 'expand' their posts with the help of AI. This function was replaced with a proof-reading feature.

=== Acquisitions ===
In July 2012, LinkedIn acquired 15 key Digg patents for $4 million including a "click a button to vote up a story" patent.

Number	Acquisition date	Company	Business	Country	Price	Description	Ref.
1	August 4, 2010	mspoke	Adaptive personalization of content	USA	$0.6 million	LinkedIn Recommendations	
2	September 23, 2010	ChoiceVendor	Social B2B Reviews	USA	$3.9 million	Rate and review B2B service providers	
3	January 26, 2011	CardMunch	Social Contacts	USA	$1.7 million	Scan and import business cards	
4	October 5, 2011	Connected	Social CRM	USA	-	LinkedIn Connected	
5	October 11, 2011	IndexTank	Social search	USA	-	LinkedIn Search	
6	February 22, 2012	Rapportive	Social Contacts	USA	$15 million	-	
7	2012	ESAYA Inc.	Social Content	USA	-	TrueSwitch - Migrate Your Email, Contacts & Calendar data Between Provider's Account	
8	May 3, 2012	SlideShare	Social Content	USA	$119 million	Give LinkedIn members a way to discover people through content	
9	April 11, 2013	Pulse	Web / Mobile newsreader	USA	$90 million	Definitive professional publishing platform	
10	February 6, 2014	Bright.com	Job Matching	USA	$120 million		
11	July 14, 2014	Newsle	Web application	USA	-	Allows users to follow real news about their Facebook friends, LinkedIn contacts, and public figures.	
11	July 22, 2014	Bizo	Web application	USA	$175 million	Helps advertisers reach businesses and professionals	
12	March 16, 2015	Careerify	Web application	Canada	-	Helps businesses hire people using social media	
13	April 2, 2015	Refresh.io	Web application	USA	-	Surfaces insights about people in your networks right before you meet them	
14	April 9, 2015	Lynda.com	eLearning	USA	$1.5 billion	Lets users learn business, technology, software, and creative skills through videos	
15	August 28, 2015	Fliptop	Predictive Sales and Marketing Firm	USA	-	Using data science to help companies close more sales	
16	February 4, 2016	Connectifier	Web application	USA	-	Helps companies with their recruiting	
17	July 26, 2016	PointDrive	Web application	USA	-	Lets salespeople share visual content with prospective clients to help seal the deal	
18	September 16, 2018	Glint Inc.	Web application	USA	-	Employee engagement platform.	
19	May 28, 2019	Drawbridge	Marketing Solutions	USA			

=== Perkins lawsuit ===
In 2013, a class action lawsuit entitled Perkins vs. LinkedIn Corp was filed against the company, accusing it of automatically sending invitations to contacts in a member's email address book without permission. The court agreed with LinkedIn that permission had in fact been given for invitations to be sent, but not for the two further reminder emails. LinkedIn settled the lawsuit in 2015 for $13 million (≈$17.2 million in 2025). Many members should have received a notice in their email with the subject line "Legal Notice of Settlement of Class Action". The Case No. is 13-CV-04303-LHK.

=== hiQ Labs v. LinkedIn ===
In May 2017, LinkedIn sent a cease-and-desist letter to hiQ Labs, a Silicon Valley startup that collects data from public profiles and provides analysis of this data to its customers. The letter demanded that hiQ immediately cease "scraping" data from LinkedIn's servers, claiming violations of the CFAA (Computer Fraud and Abuse Act) and the DMCA (Digital Millennium Copyright Act). In response hiQ sued LinkedIn in the Northern District of California in San Francisco, asking the court to prohibit LinkedIn from blocking its access to public profiles while the court considered the merits of its request. The court served a preliminary injunction against LinkedIn, which was then forced to allow hiQ to continue to collect public data. LinkedIn appealed this ruling; in September 2019, the appeals court rejected LinkedIn's arguments and the preliminary injunction was upheld. The dispute is ongoing.

In May 2026, LinkedIn announced a reduction of its global workforce by approximately 5%, affecting roughly 875 employees across its engineering, product, and marketing divisions. The layoffs, announced by CEO Daniel Shapero, occurred as part of a structural pivot toward AI infrastructure despite the company reporting record quarterly revenue exceeding $5 billion earlier that year.

== Membership ==
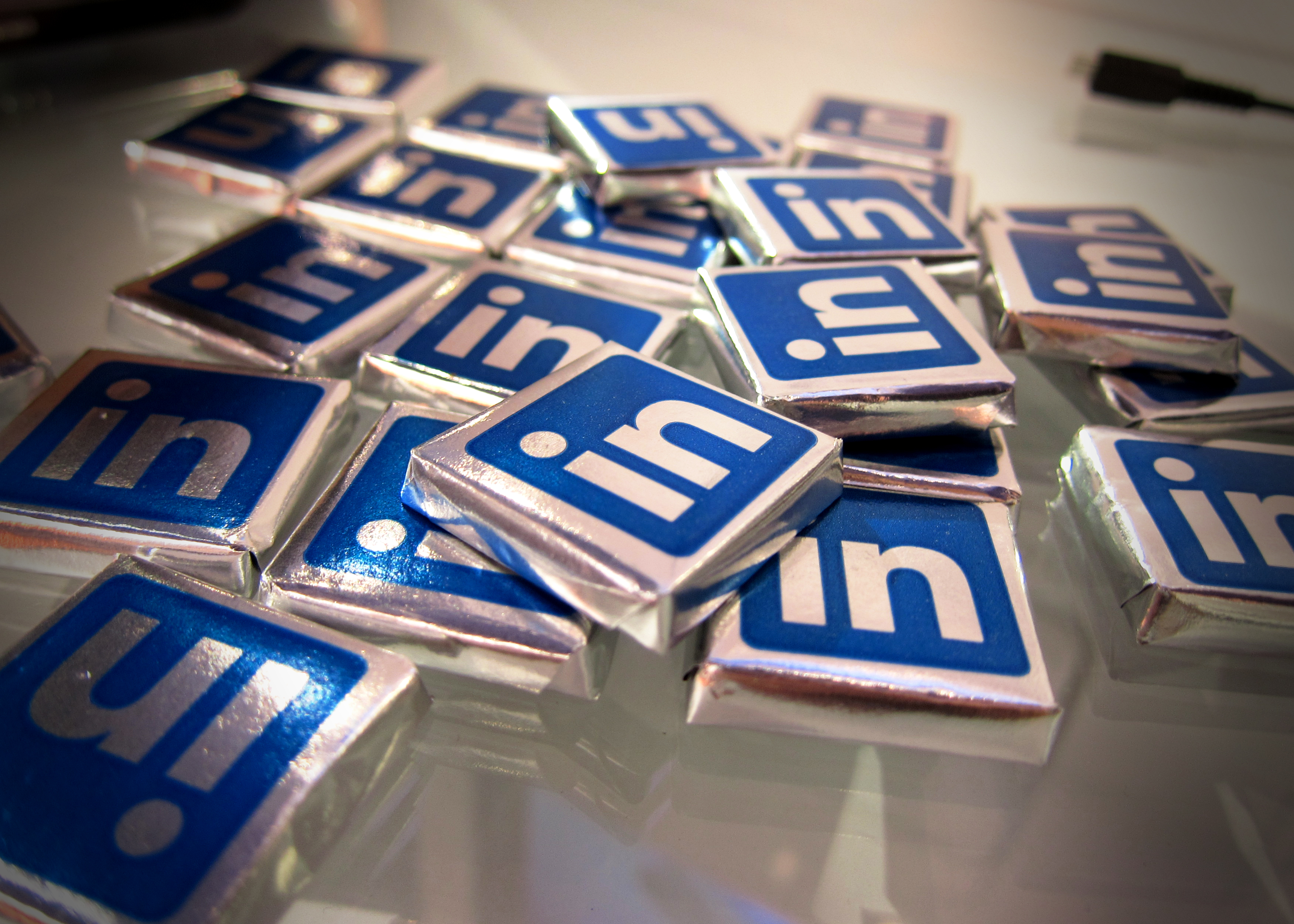
Social media websites may also use "traditional" marketing approaches, as seen in these LinkedIn-branded chocolates.

In 2015, LinkedIn had more than 400 million members in over 200 countries and territories, which was significantly more than competitor Viadeo (50 million as of 2013.) In 2011, its membership grew by approximately two new members every second. In 2020, LinkedIn's membership grew to over 690 million LinkedIn members. As of September 2021, LinkedIn had 774+ million registered members from over 200 countries and territories. In November 2023, LinkedIn reached a member count of one billion. In addition in LinkedIn expanded its verification program, allowing members to verify their identity, workplace, or educational institution through third-party verification partners. Verified members receive a verification badge on their profile indicating that certain profile information has been authenticated.As of March 2026, LinkedIn has 1.3 billion registered users. In February 2026, the website saw 1.4 billion monthly visits.

Despite having 1.3 billion registered users, only approximately 1% of monthly users share content on a weekly basis, creating significant visibility opportunity for professionals who post consistently.

=== Demographic ===
As of late 2025, LinkedIn's global user base is predominantly composed of young to mid-career professionals. The largest age demographic is the 25-34 age group, making up 33.4% of all users. This is followed by the 18-24 demographic at 20.5%, while users between the ages of 35-54 represent 15.9% of the platform. Only 1.8% of users are aged 55 or older.

In terms of geographic distribution, the United States remains the largest market with approximately 230 million users, followed by India (130 million) and Brazil (71 million). LinkedIn's global audience is also majority male, with men accounting for 56.8% of the user base. In addition, the platform has seen a significant rise in its premium subscription model with a 85% increase from 2019 to 2023.

== Platform and features ==
=== User profile network ===
==== Basic functionality ====
LinkedIn homepage

The basic functionality of LinkedIn allows users to create profiles, which for employees typically consist of a curriculum vitae describing their work experience, education and training, skills, and a personal photo. Employers can list jobs and search for potential candidates. Users can find jobs, people and business opportunities recommended by someone in one's contact network. Users can save jobs that they would like to apply for. Users also have the ability to follow different companies.

The site also enables members to make "connections" to each other in an online social network which may represent real-world professional relationships. Members can invite anyone to become a connection. Users can obtain introductions to the connections of connections (termed second-degree connections) and connections of second-degree connections (termed third-degree connections).

A member's list of connections can be used in a number of ways. For example, users can search for second-degree connections who work at a company they are interested in, and then ask a specific first-degree connection in common for an introduction. The "gated-access approach" (where contact with any professional requires either an existing relationship, or the intervention of a contact of theirs) is intended to build trust among the service's users. LinkedIn participated in the EU's International Safe Harbor Privacy Principles.

Users can interact with each other in a variety of ways:

- Connections can interact by choosing to "like" posts and "congratulate" others on updates such as birthdays, anniversaries and new positions, as well as by direct messaging.
- Users can share video with text and filters with the introduction of LinkedIn Video.
- Users can share posts, updates, and professional content with their network. LinkedIn’s algorithm has been reported to prioritize content that generates professional engagement, such as career updates and networking interactions, which can influence how users present themselves on the platform.
- Users can write posts and articles within the LinkedIn platform to share with their network.

Since September 2012, LinkedIn has enabled users to "endorse" each other's skills. However, there is no way of flagging anything other than positive content. LinkedIn solicits endorsements using algorithms that generate skills members might have. Members cannot opt out of such solicitations, with the result that it sometimes appears that a member is soliciting an endorsement for a non-existent skill.

=== Applications ===
LinkedIn 'applications' often refer to external third-party applications that interact with LinkedIn's developer API. However, in some cases, it could refer to sanctioned applications featured on a user's profile page.

==== External third-party applications ====
In February 2015, LinkedIn released an updated terms of use for its developer API. The developer API allows both companies and individuals the ability to interact with LinkedIn's data through creation of managed third-party applications. Applications must go through a review process and request permission from the user before accessing a user's data.

Normal use of the API is outlined in LinkedIn's developer documents, including:

- Sign into external services using LinkedIn
- Add items or attributes to a user profile
- Share items or articles to user's timeline

==== Embedded in profile ====
In October 2008, LinkedIn enabled an "applications platform" which allows external online services to be embedded within a member's profile page. Among the initial applications were an Amazon Reading List that allows LinkedIn members to display books they are reading, a connection to Tripit, and a Six Apart, WordPress and TypePad application that allows members to display their latest blog postings within their LinkedIn profile. In November 2010, LinkedIn allowed businesses to list products and services on company profile pages; it also permitted LinkedIn members to "recommend" products and services and write reviews. Shortly after, some of the external services were no longer supported, including Amazon's Reading List.

=== Mobile ===
A mobile version of the site was launched in February 2008 and made available in six languages: Chinese, English, French, German, Japanese and Spanish. In January 2011, LinkedIn acquired CardMunch, a mobile app maker that scans business cards and converts into contacts. In June 2013, CardMunch was noted as an available LinkedIn app. In October 2013, LinkedIn announced a service for iPhone users called "Intro", which inserts a thumbnail of a person's LinkedIn profile in correspondence with that person when reading mail messages in the native iOS Mail program. This is accomplished by re-routing all emails from and to the iPhone through LinkedIn servers, which security firm Bishop Fox asserts has serious privacy implications, violates many organizations' security policies, and resembles a man-in-the-middle attack.

=== Groups ===
LinkedIn supports the creation of professional interest groups, which allow members to discuss topics related to industries, occupations, and shared professional interests. In 2012, there were 1,248,019 such groups, with membership sizes ranging from small communities to groups with several hundred thousand members Groups support a limited form of discussion area, moderated by the group owners and managers. Depending on their settings, groups may be public, private listed, or private unlisted; public group content can be visible beyond the group’s membership, while participation generally requires joining the group. Since groups offer the functionality to reach a wide audience without so easily falling foul of anti-spam solutions, there is a constant stream of spam postings, and there now exists a range of firms who offer a spamming service for this very purpose. LinkedIn has devised a few mechanisms to reduce the volume of spam, and decided to remove the ability of group owners to inspect the email address of new members in order to determine if they were spammers. Groups also keep their members informed through emails with updates to the group, including most talked about discussions within your professional circles.

In December 2011, LinkedIn announced that it is rolling out polls to groups. In November 2013, LinkedIn announced the addition of Showcase Pages to the platform. In 2014, LinkedIn announced it was going to be removing Product and Services Pages paving the way for a greater focus on Showcase Pages.

=== Games ===
In May 2024, LinkedIn launched the first three puzzle games available on its mobile and online sites: Pinpoint, Queens, and Crossclimb. These games followed The New York Times' successful integration of Wordle while encouraging users to take a break at work and keeping them in friendly competition with their network.

LinkedIn games refresh daily and record completion time per user, so users can compare their score across their network and the LinkedIn community at large. Users can keep streaks with up to two "freezes" per week, and are encouraged to keep streaks through notifications sent twice a day to users after one game has been played. LinkedIn Games has since expanded to include Wend, Patches, Zip, Mini Sudoku, and Tango.

=== Knowledge graph ===
LinkedIn maintains an internal knowledge graph of entities (people, organizations, groups) that helps it connect everyone working in a field or at an organization or network. This can be used to query the neighborhood around each entity to find updates that might be related to it. This also lets it train machine learning models that can infer new properties about an entity or further information that may apply to it for both summary views and analytics.

=== Discontinued features ===
In January 2013, LinkedIn dropped support for LinkedIn Answers and cited a new 'focus on development of new and more engaging ways to share and discuss professional topics across LinkedIn' as the reason for the retirement of the feature. The feature had been launched in 2007 and allowed users to post questions to their network and allowed users to rank answers.

In 2014, LinkedIn retired InMaps, a feature which allowed you to visualize your professional network. The feature had been in use since January 2011.

According to the company's website, LinkedIn Referrals will no longer be available after May 2018.

In September 2021, LinkedIn discontinued LinkedIn stories, a feature that was rolled out worldwide in October 2020.

LinkedIn has discontinued native profile video, though the audio name pronunciation feature remains available.

In 2023, LinkedIn also discontinued LinkedIn Audio Events, though LinkedIn Live Video remains available but only through third-party streaming integrations such as StreamYard and Restream.

== Usage ==
=== Personal branding ===
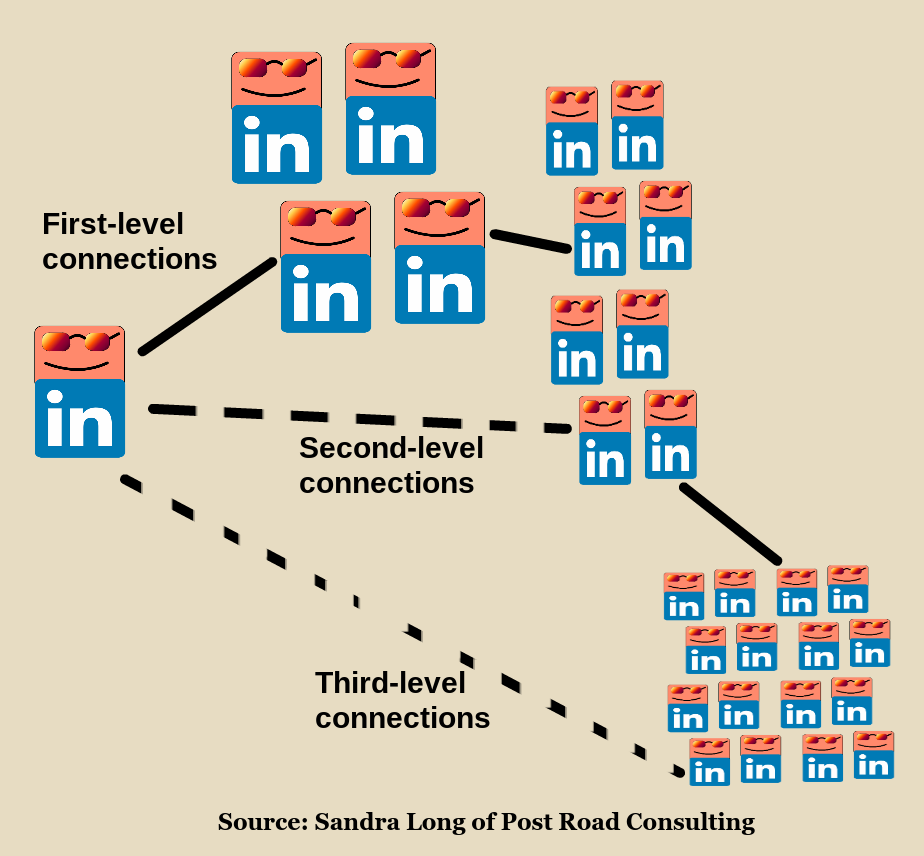
When a user accepts an invitation from another user, they have a first-level connection; the user is indirectly connected to the other user's connections with what LinkedIn terms second-level and third-level connections.

LinkedIn is particularly well-suited for personal branding, which, according to Sandra Long, entails "actively managing one's image and unique value" to position oneself for career opportunities. LinkedIn has evolved from being a mere platform for job searchers into a social network which allows users a chance to create a personal brand. Career coach Pamela Green describes a personal brand as the "emotional experience you want people to have as a result of interacting with you," and a LinkedIn profile is an aspect of that. A contrasting report suggests that a personal brand is "a public-facing persona, exhibited on LinkedIn, Twitter and other networks, that showcases expertise and fosters new connections."

LinkedIn allows professionals to build exposure for their brand within the site itself and on the World Wide Web as a whole. Business Growth Strategist Wendy Shore, writing in Entrepreneur, has described LinkedIn as a dynamic platform for personal branding, professional visibility, and authentic connection-building, noting that it has evolved well beyond its origins as a job search tool into a primary channel for establishing authority and growing revenue.

With a tool that LinkedIn dubs a Profile Strength Meter, the site encourages users to offer enough information in their profile to optimize visibility by search engines. It can strengthen a user's LinkedIn presence if they belong to professional groups on the site. The site enables users to add a video to their profiles. Some users hire a professional photographer for their profile photo. Video presentations can be added to one's profile. LinkedIn's capabilities have been expanding so rapidly that a cottage industry of outside consultants has grown up to help users navigate the system. A particular emphasis is helping users with their LinkedIn profiles.

There's no hiding in the long grass on LinkedIn ... The number one mistake people make on the profile is to not have a photo.

— Sandra Long of Post Road Consulting, 2017

In October 2012, LinkedIn launched the LinkedIn Influencers program, which features global thought leaders who share their professional insights with LinkedIn's members. As of May 2016, there are 750+ Influencers. The program is invite-only and features leaders from a range of industries, including Richard Branson, Narendra Modi, Arianna Huffington, Greg McKeown, Rahm Emanuel, Jamie Dimon, Martha Stewart, Deepak Chopra, Jack Welch, and Bill Gates.

LinkedIn further supports personal branding through interactive features that encourage ongoing engagement and credibility building. Users can share posts, write articles, and interact with content to demonstrate expertise and remain visible within their networks. Features such as endorsements and written recommendations allow connections to validate a user’s skills and professional reputation, adding a layer of social proof to their profile. Additionally, LinkedIn provides analytics that show profile views and content engagement, helping users better understand how they are perceived and refine their personal brand over time.

=== Job seeking ===
Job seekers and employers widely use LinkedIn. According to Jack Meyer, the site has become the "premier digital platform" for professionals to network online. In Australia, which has approximately twelve million working professionals, ten million of them are on LinkedIn, according to Anastasia Santoreneos, suggesting that the probability was high that one's "future employer is probably on the site." According to one estimate based on worldwide figures, 122 million users got job interviews via LinkedIn and 35 million were hired by a LinkedIn online connection.

LinkedIn also allows users to research companies, non-profit organizations, and governments they may be interested in working for. Typing the name of a company or organization in the search box causes pop-up data about the company or organization to appear. Such data may include the ratio of female to male employees, the percentage of the most common titles/positions held within the company, the location of the company's headquarters and offices, and a list of present and former employees. In July 2011, LinkedIn launched a new feature allowing companies to include an "Apply with LinkedIn" button on job listing pages. The new plugin allowed potential employees to apply for positions using their LinkedIn profiles as resumes.

LinkedIn can help small businesses connect with customers. In the site's parlance, two users have a "first-degree connection" when one accepts an invitation from another. People connected to each of them are "second-degree connections" and persons connected to the second-degree connections are "third-degree connections." This forms a user's internal LinkedIn network, making the user's profile more likely to appear in searches.

LinkedIn's Profinder is a marketplace where freelancers can (for a monthly subscription fee) bid for project proposals submitted by individuals and small businesses. In 2017, it had around 60,000 freelancers in more than 140 service areas, such as headshot photography, bookkeeping or tax filing.

The premise for connecting with someone has shifted significantly in recent years. Before the 2017 new interface was launched, LinkedIn encouraged connections between people who'd already worked, studied, done business, or the like. Since 2017, that step has been removed from the connection request process - and users are allowed to connect with up to 30,000 people. This change means LinkedIn is a more proactive networking site for job applicants trying to secure a career move or for salespeople wanting to generate new client leads.

=== Top Companies ===
LinkedIn Top Companies is a series of lists published by LinkedIn, identifying companies in the United States, Australia, Brazil, Canada, China, France, Germany, India, Indonesia, Japan, Mexico, South Korea, Spain, and the United Kingdom that are attracting the most intense interest from job candidates. The 2019 lists identified Google's parent company, Alphabet, as the most sought-after U.S. company, with Facebook ranked second and Amazon ranked third. The lists are based on more than one billion actions by LinkedIn members worldwide. The Top Companies lists were started in 2016 and are published annually. The 2021 top list identified Amazon as the top company, with Alphabet ranked second and JPMorgan & Chase Co. ranked third.

=== LinkedIn Top Voices and other rankings ===
Since 2015, LinkedIn has published annual rankings of Top Voices on the platform, recognizing "members that generated the most engagement and interaction with their posts."

The blue Top Voice badge is an invitation-only, awarded by LinkedIn's editorial team to members who consistently share original professional insights and contribute meaningfully to discussions on the platform. Recipients are selected based on factors such as content quality, subject-matter expertise, community engagement, and adherence to LinkedIn’s professional standards. LinkedIn regularly evaluates existing Top Voices to ensure they remain among the most engaged and prolific contributors.

The 2020 lists included 14 industry categories, ranging from data science to sports, as well as 14 country lists, extending from Australia to Italy.

LinkedIn also publishes data-driven annual rankings of the Top Startups in more than a dozen countries, based on "employment growth, job interest from potential candidates, engagement, and attraction of top talent."

=== Advertising and for-pay research ===
In 2008, LinkedIn launched LinkedIn DirectAds as a form of sponsored advertising. In October 2008, LinkedIn revealed plans to open its social network of 30 million professionals globally as a potential sample for business-to-business research. It is testing a potential social network revenue model – research that, to some, appears more promising than advertising. On July 23, 2013, LinkedIn announced its Sponsored Updates ad service. Individuals and companies can now pay a fee to have LinkedIn sponsor their content and spread it to its user base. This is a common way for social media sites such as LinkedIn to generate revenue.

LinkedIn launched its carousel ads feature in 2018, making it the newest addition to the platform's advertising options. With carousel ads, businesses can showcase their products or services through a series of swipeable cards, each with its unique image, headline, and description. They can be used for various marketing objectives, such as promoting a new product launch, driving website traffic, generating leads, or building brand awareness.

=== Business Manager ===
On July 22, 2022, LinkedIn announced the creation of Business Manager. The new Business Manager is a centralized platform designed to make it easier for large companies and agencies to manage people, ad accounts, and business pages.

=== Publishing platform ===
In 2015, LinkedIn added an analytics tool to its publishing platform. The tool allows authors to better track the traffic that their posts receive. In relation to this functionality, LinkedIn has gained more users over the years in the interest of clearly monitoring users' posts through post-performance analytics

== Economic graph ==
Inspired by Facebook's "social graph", LinkedIn CEO Jeff Weiner set a goal in 2012 to create an "economic graph" within a decade. The goal was to create a comprehensive digital map of the world economy and the connections within it. The economic graph was to be built on the company's current platform with data nodes including companies, jobs, skills, volunteer opportunities, educational institutions, and content. The project's vision was to include all the job listings in the world, all the skills required to get those jobs, all the professionals who could fill them, and all the companies (nonprofit and for-profit) at which they work. The ultimate goal is to make the world economy and job market more efficient through increased transparency. In June 2014, the company announced its "Galene" search architecture to give users access to the economic graph's data with more thorough filtering of data, via user searches like "Engineers with Hadoop experience in Brazil."

LinkedIn has published blog posts using economic graph data to research several topics on the job market, including popular destination cities of recent college graduates, areas with high concentrations of technology skills, and common career transitions. LinkedIn provided the City of New York with data from economic graph showing "in-demand" tech skills for the city's "Tech Talent Pipeline" project.

== Role in networking ==
LinkedIn has been described by online trade publication TechRepublic as having "become the de facto tool for professional networking". LinkedIn has also been praised for its usefulness in fostering business relationships. "LinkedIn is, far and away, the most advantageous social networking tool available to job seekers and business professionals today", according to Forbes. LinkedIn has inspired the creation of specialised professional networking opportunities, such as co-founder Eddie Lou's Chicago startup, Shiftgig (released in 2012 as a platform for hourly workers).

== Criticism and controversies ==
=== Controversial design choices ===
==== Endorsement feature ====
The feature that allows LinkedIn members to "endorse" each other's skills and experience has been criticized as meaningless, since the endorsements are not necessarily accurate or given by people who have familiarity with the member's skills. In October 2016, LinkedIn acknowledged that it "really does matter who endorsed you" and began highlighting endorsements from "coworkers and other mutual connections" to address the criticism.

==== Use of e-mail accounts of members for spam sending ====
LinkedIn sends "invite emails" to Outlook contacts from its members' email accounts, without obtaining their consent. The "invitations" give the impression that the e-mail holder themself has sent the invitation. If there is no response, the answer will be repeated several times ("You have not yet answered XY's invitation.") LinkedIn was sued in the United States on charges of hijacking e-mail accounts and spamming. The company argued with the right to freedom of expression. In addition, the users concerned would be supported in building a network.

The sign-up process includes users entering their email password (there is an opt-out feature). LinkedIn will then offer to send out contact invitations to all members in that address book or that the user has had email conversations with. When the member's email address book is opened, it is opened with all email addresses selected, and the member is advised invitations will be sent to "selected" email addresses, or to all. LinkedIn was sued for sending out another two follow-up invitations to each contact from members to link to friends who had ignored the initial, authorized invitation.

In November 2014, LinkedIn lost a motion to dismiss the lawsuit, in a ruling that the invitations were advertisements not broadly protected by free speech rights that would otherwise permit use of people's names and images without authorization. The lawsuit was eventually settled in 2015 in favor of LinkedIn members.

==== Moving emails to LinkedIn servers ====
At the end of 2013 it was announced that the LinkedIn app intercepted users' emails and quietly moved them to LinkedIn servers for full access. LinkedIn used man-in-the-middle attacks.

=== Security incidents ===
==== 2012 hack ====
In June 2012, cryptographic hashes of approximately 6.4 million LinkedIn user passwords were stolen by Yevgeniy Nikulin and other hackers who then published the stolen hashes online. This action is known as the 2012 LinkedIn hack. In response to the incident, LinkedIn asked its users to change their passwords. Security experts criticized LinkedIn for not salting its password file and for using a single iteration of SHA-1. On May 31, 2013, LinkedIn added two-factor authentication, an important security enhancement for preventing hackers from gaining access to accounts. In May 2016, 117 million LinkedIn usernames and passwords were offered for sale online for the equivalent of $2,200 (≈$2,951 in 2025). These account details are believed to be sourced from the original 2012 LinkedIn hack, in which the number of user IDs stolen had been underestimated. To handle the large volume of emails sent to its users every day with notifications for messages, profile views, important happenings in their network, and other things, LinkedIn uses the Momentum email platform from Message Systems.

==== 2021 breaches ====
A breach disclosed in April 2021 affected 500 million users. A breach disclosed in June 2021 was thought to have affected 92% of users, exposing contact information, employment information. LinkedIn asserted that the data was aggregated via web scraping from LinkedIn as well as several other sites, and noted that "only information that people listed publicly in their profiles" was included.

=== Malicious behavior on LinkedIn ===
==== Phishing ====
In what is known as Operation Socialist, documents released by Edward Snowden in the 2013 global surveillance disclosures revealed that British Government Communications Headquarters (GCHQ) (an intelligence and security organisation) infiltrated the Belgian telecommunications network Belgacom by luring employees to a false LinkedIn page.

In 2014, Dell SecureWorks Counter Threat Unit (CTU) discovered that Threat Group-2889, an Iran-based group, created 25 fake LinkedIn accounts. The accounts were either fully developed personas or supporting personas. They use spearphishing and malicious websites against their victims.

According to reporting by Le Figaro, France's General Directorate for Internal Security and Directorate-General for External Security believe that Chinese spies have used LinkedIn to target thousands of business and government officials as potential sources of information.

In 2017, Germany's Federal Office for the Protection of the Constitution (BfV) published information alleging that Chinese intelligence services had created fake social media profiles on sites such as LinkedIn, using them to gather information on German politicians and government officials.

In 2022, the company ranked first in a list of brands most likely to be imitated in phishing attempts.

In August 2023, several Linkedin users were targeted by hackers in hijacking and phishing bid. Users were locked out of their accounts and threatened with permanent account deletion if they did not pay a ransom.

==== False and misleading information ====
LinkedIn has come under scrutiny for its handling of misinformation and disinformation. The platform has struggled to deal with fake profiles and falsehoods about COVID-19 and the 2020 US presidential election.

=== Policies ===
==== Privacy policy ====
The German Stiftung Warentest has criticized that the balance of rights between users and LinkedIn is disproportionate, restricting users' rights excessively while granting the company far-reaching rights. It has also been claimed that LinkedIn does not respond to consumer protection center requests.

==== DEI and hate speech ====
In January 2025 during the second Trump administration, LinkedIn quietly deleted its Diversity, equity, and inclusion (DEI) web page. Later in July of that year, the company removed its protections against the misgendering and deadnaming of transgender users.

==== Account banning ====
Without giving its users any prior notice, Linkedin has been removing accounts that do not follow its criteria since 2022.

=== Browsergate: data breach and espionage operation ===
An investigation by Fairlinked e.V. alleges that LinkedIn has been covertly scanning users' browsers for installed extensions, potentially affecting 405 million people, in what the group calls one of the largest data breach scandals in digital history, naming it the Browsergate.

LinkedIn allegedly deploys JavaScript that scans for over 6,000 browser extensions, identifying sensitive indicators such as religious beliefs, political views, health conditions, and job-seeking activity. The harvested data is reportedly shared with HUMAN Security, a cybersecurity firm with ties to ex-officers of Israel's Unit 8200 cyber warfare division.

The practice is alleged to violate GDPR, as no explicit user consent is obtained and the data collection is not disclosed in LinkedIn's privacy policy. LinkedIn also reportedly scans for 200+ competing tools (e.g., Salesforce, HubSpot, Apollo), potentially mapping competitor software usage. LinkedIn denied the allegations, stating the data is used only to detect Terms of Service violations and protect platform stability — not to infer sensitive personal information. Two class action lawsuits followed in California and another lawsuit in Germany.

== Academic research ==
Massive amounts of data from LinkedIn allow scientists and machine learning researchers to extract insights and build product features. For example, this data can help to shape patterns of deception in resumes. Findings suggested that people commonly lie about their hobbies rather than their work experience on online resumes.

=== Labor market effects ===
In 2010, Social Science Computer Review published research by economists Ralf Caers and Vanessa Castelyns who sent an online questionnaire to 398 and 353 LinkedIn and Facebook users respectively in Belgium and found that both sites had become tools for recruiting job applicants for professional occupations as well as additional information about applicants, and that it was being used by recruiters to decide which applicants would receive interviews. In May 2017, Research Policy published an analysis of PhD holders use of LinkedIn and found that PhD holders who move into industry were more likely to have LinkedIn accounts and to have larger networks of LinkedIn connections, were more likely to use LinkedIn if they had co-authors abroad, and to have wider networks if they moved abroad after obtaining their PhD.

Also in 2017, sociologist Ofer Sharone conducted interviews with unemployed workers to research the effects of LinkedIn and Facebook as labor market intermediaries. Sharone found that social networking services (SNS) have had a filtration effect that has little to do with evaluations of merit. Specifically, Sharone argued that 1) how job seekers' profile pictures appear to the gaze of hiring parties; 2) whether seekers are able to construct personal narratives to fit how profiles are screened; and 3) how the limited visibility of singular resumes can be disadvantageous for workers interested in multiple fields are causing a filtering effect. Consequently, this SNS filtration effect has exerted new pressures on workers to manage their careers to conform to the logic of the SNS filtration effect.

In October 2018, Foster School of Business professors Melissa Rhee, Elina Hwang, and Yong Tan performed an empirical analysis of whether the common professional networking tactic by job seekers of creating LinkedIn connections with professionals who work at a target company or in a target field is actually instrumental in obtaining referrals and found instead that job seekers were less likely to be referred by employees who were employed by the target company or in the target field due to job similarity and self-protection from competition. Rhee, Hwang, and Tan further found that referring employees in higher hierarchical positions than the job candidates were more likely to provide referrals and that gender homophily did not reduce the competition self-protection effect.

In July 2019, sociologists Steve McDonald, Amanda K. Damarin, Jenelle Lawhorne, and Annika Wilcox performed qualitative interviews with 61 human resources recruiters in two metropolitan areas in the Southern United States and found that recruiters filling low- and general-skilled positions typically posted advertisements on online job boards while recruiters filling high-skilled or supervisor positions targeted passive candidates on LinkedIn (i.e. employed workers not actively seeking work but possibly willing to change positions), and concluded that this is resulting in a bifurcated winner-takes-all job market with recruiters focusing their efforts on poaching already employed high-skilled workers while active job seekers are relegated to hyper-competitive online job boards. In December 2001, the ACM SIGGROUP Bulletin published a study on the use of mobile phones by blue-collar workers that noted that research about tools for blue-collar workers to find work in the digital age was strangely absent and expressed concern that the absence of such research could lead to technology design choices that would concentrate greater power in the hands of managers rather than workers.

In a September 2019 working paper, economists Laurel Wheeler, Robert Garlick, and RTI International scholars Eric Johnson, Patrick Shaw, and Marissa Gargano ran a randomized evaluation of training job seekers in South Africa to use LinkedIn as part of job readiness programs. The evaluation found that the training increased the job seekers employment by approximately 10 percent by reducing information frictions between job seekers and prospective employers, that the training had this effect for approximately 12 months, and that while the training may also have facilitated referrals, it did not reduce job search costs and the jobs for the treatment and control groups in the evaluation had equal probabilities of retention, promotion, and obtaining a permanent contract. In 2020, Applied Economics published research by economists Steffen Brenner, Sezen Aksin Sivrikaya, and Joachim Schwalbach using LinkedIn demonstrating that high status individuals self-select into professional networking services rather than workers unsatisfied with their career status adversely selecting into the services to receive networking benefits.

== International restrictions ==
In February 2011, it was reported that LinkedIn was being blocked in China after calls for a "Jasmine Revolution". It was speculated to have been blocked because it is an easy way for dissidents to access Twitter, which had been blocked previously. After a day of being blocked, LinkedIn access was restored in China.

In February 2014, LinkedIn launched its Simplified Chinese language version named "领英" (pinyin: Lǐngyīng; lit. 'leading elite'), officially extending its service in China. LinkedIn CEO Jeff Weiner acknowledged in a blog post that it would have to censor some of the content that users post on its website in order to comply with Chinese rules, but he also said the benefits of providing its online service to people in China outweighed those concerns. Since Autumn 2017 job postings from western countries for China aren't possible anymore.

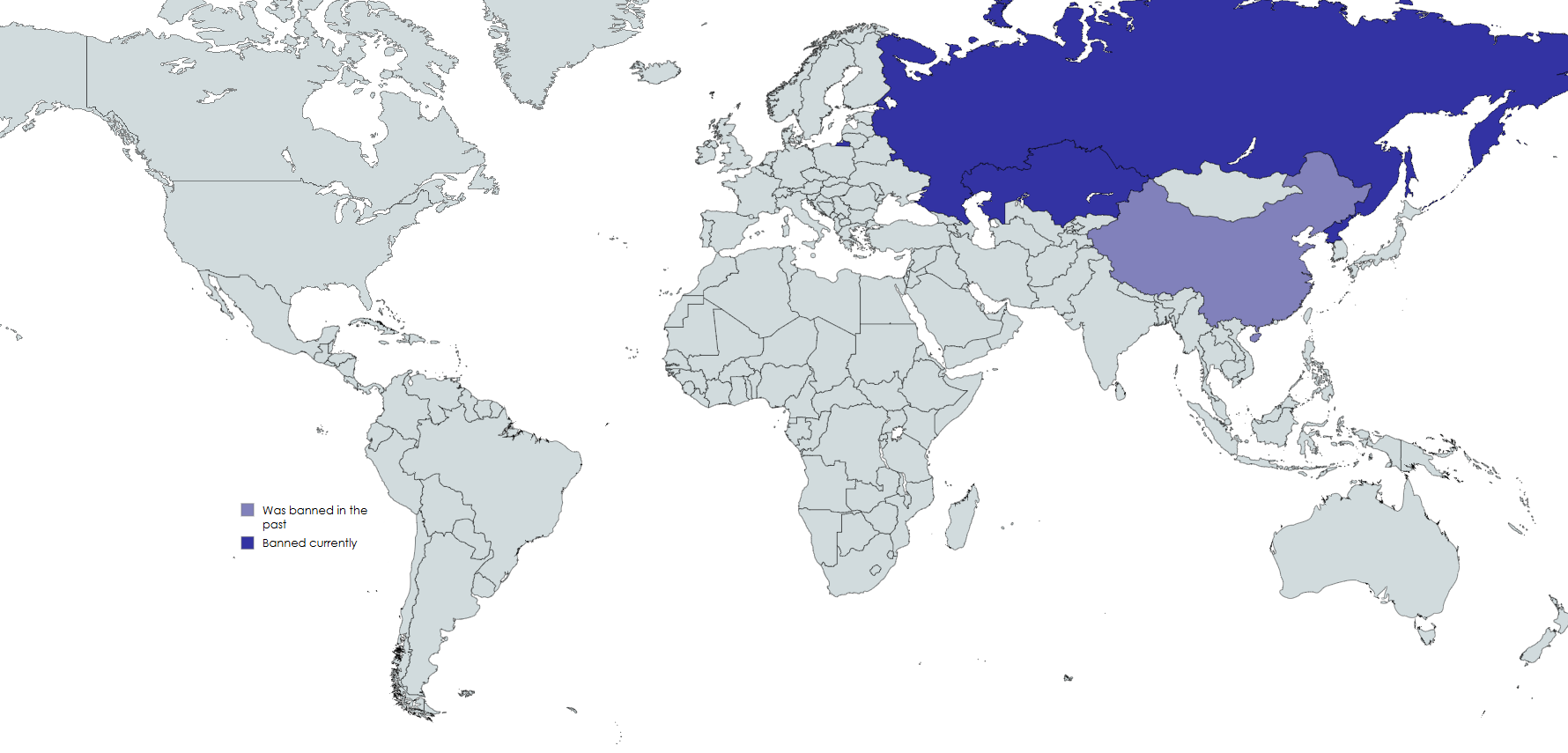
Map of bans on LinkedIn (worldwide)

In 2016, a Moscow court ruled that LinkedIn must be blocked in Russia for violating a data retention law which requires the user data of Russian citizens to be stored on servers within the country. The relevant law had been in force there since 2014. This ban was upheld on November 10, 2016, and all Russian ISPs began blocking LinkedIn thereafter. LinkedIn's mobile app was also banned from Google Play Store and iOS App Store in Russia in January 2017. In July 2021 it was also blocked in Kazakhstan.

In October 2021, after reports that several academics and reporters had received notifications stating that their profiles were now blocked in China, Microsoft confirmed that LinkedIn would shut down in China and be replaced by InJobs, a China-exclusive app, citing difficulties with the operating environment and increasing compliance requirements. The replacement service ultimately launched in December 2021 under the name InCareer. In May 2023, LinkedIn announced that it would discontinue InCareer effective August 9, 2023. LinkedIn continues to provide some services in mainland China, including LinkedIn Learning and some enterprise products.

== Open-source contributions ==
Since 2010, LinkedIn has contributed several internal technologies, tools, and software products to the open source domain. Notable among these projects is Apache Kafka, which was built and open sourced at LinkedIn in 2011.

== See also ==
- Business network
- Employment website
- List of social networking services
- Reputation systems
- Social network
- Social software
- Timeline of social media
