= Jeff Weiner =

American businessman (born 1970)

Jeffrey Weiner
- Born: February 21, 1970 (age 56); New York City, New York, U.S.
- Education: University of Pennsylvania (BS)
- Occupation: Founding Partner of Next Play Ventures
- Website: LinkedIn

Jeffrey Weiner (born February 21, 1970) is an American businessman. He was the chief executive officer (CEO) of LinkedIn, a business-related social networking website. He started with LinkedIn on December 15, 2008, as Interim President. Weiner played an instrumental role in LinkedIn's acquisition by Microsoft for $26 billion (~$33.2 billion in 2024) in June 2016. Additionally, he was the Executive Chairman of LinkedIn from 2020 to 2026. He is currently the Founding Partner of Next Play Ventures.

== Early life and education ==
Weiner was born on 21 February 1970 in New York City, New York. He graduated from the Wharton School of the University of Pennsylvania in 1992 with a Bachelor of Science in Economics.

== Career ==
Weiner served in various leadership roles at Yahoo! for over seven years beginning in 2001, most recently as the Executive Vice President of Yahoo's Network Division. As EVP of Yahoo, he led a team of over 3,000 employees, managing products reaching over 500 million consumers. While serving Yahoo’s Network Division, he was part of the Search leadership team that directed the acquisition and integration of Inktomi, AltaVista, and FAST as well as the development of Yahoo! Search Technology.

He has worked at Warner Bros. as Vice President of Warner Bros. Online, developing its initial business plan. He was an Executive-in-Residence for leading venture capital firms Accel and Greylock Partners.

In 2009, Weiner implemented the first BizOps team at LinkedIn.

In 2011, Weiner and Reid Hoffman were the U.S. Overall winners of the EY Entrepreneur of the Year Award

In 2014, Weiner was recognized by LinkedIn employees via Glassdoor's annual survey as among "the top 10 CEOs at U.S. Tech Companies".

In 2016, Weiner received media attention for donating his $14 million stock bonus to the pool for LinkedIn employees following a drop in share price.

On February 5, 2020, Weiner announced he will step down as CEO of LinkedIn and become executive chairman in order to focus on closing the network gap and realizing LinkedIn's vision of creating economic opportunity for every member of the global workforce. He named Ryan Roslansky as his replacement.

On April 22, 2026, Weiner shared that Ryan Roslansky transitioned as CEO of LinkedIn, naming Daniel Shapero as successor. As a result, Weiner ended his tenure as Executive Chairman. He remains focused on Next Play Ventures, coaching and investing in entrepreneurial leaders.

== Other interests ==
Weiner formerly served a Board Director for Intuit and EverFi, and was active in the non-profit sector, serving on the Board of Directors of DonorsChoose.org and Malaria No More.
