= LinkedIn Top Companies =

Business rankings

LinkedIn Top Companies is a series of business rankings published by LinkedIn, identifying companies in the United States, as well as 19 other countries in Europe, Asia, Latin America and Oceania, that provide the best opportunities for employees to grow their careers. The lists draw on the latest 12 months of data involving actions onsite by LinkedIn's 756 million members worldwide. The Top Companies lists were started in 2016 and are published annually.

== Methodology ==
LinkedIn's lists are based on billions of actions globally by the site's registered users. In 2018, the methodology focused on measuring interest in a company’s jobs and people, as well as a company’s ability to retain its employees. At that time, performance metrics included the rate at which people were viewing and applying to job postings, including paid listings, unpaid ones and those linked from other sites. LinkedIn also tracked how many professionals were viewing a company’s career page, how many non-employees were asking to connect with a company’s employees—and whether employees at companies under study were sticking around for at least a year.

Academic experts such as Wharton professors Charles Bidwell and Adam Grant, along with Harvard Business School professor Francesca Gino, have advised LinkedIn on how to expand the analysis that underlies these rankings. As a result, the methodology for 2021 was updated to focus on seven themes associated with career progression: ability to advance, skills growth, company stability, external opportunity, gender diversity, company affinity and employees' diversity of educational backgrounds. The methodology doesn't include factors such as race or salary levels.

All results are normalized to ensure that companies are measured against peers. The lists consider public and privately held companies with 500 or more employees, with the exception of LinkedIn and its parent company, Microsoft, which are excluded.

== Hallmarks of top companies ==
In the 2018 U.S. list, companies in technology, media and finance were especially prominent, according to CNBC. Among the top 10 U.S. companies analyzed by Inc., Amazon offered to prepay 95 percent of tuition, textbooks, and fees for its employees to receive training in "professions of the future." Alphabet's newest offices included sky-high dog parks, indoor fire pits, and bouldering walls. Tesla has a carpool program that lets employees drive a Tesla to work and keep it on weekends, and Comcast NBCUniversal employees get complimentary access to Universal theme parks, as well as early access to NBCUniversal movies and TV shows.

In the 2021 list, according to AdWeek, the COVID-19 pandemic increased the prominence of healthcare companies on the list. These include UnitedHealth Group (No. 11), CVS Health (15), Kaiser Permanente (23), Johnson & Johnson (30) and HCA Healthcare (34). Companies with active diversity initiatives also appeared prominently. So did companies that helped employees build more of a life at home.

== United States lists ==
LinkedIn's 2021 Top Companies U.S. list ranked 50 companies, with Amazon in the No. 1 spot, followed by Google's parent company, Alphabet, as No. 2, JPMorgan Chase as No. 3, AT&T as No. 4 and Bank of America as No. 5.

The Top Companies lists weren't published in 2020.

LinkedIn's 2019 U.S. list ranked 50 companies, with Alphabet appearing as No. 1, followed by Facebook as second and Amazon in third. The 2018 U.S. list ranked 50 companies, with Amazon appearing as No. 1. Google's parent company, Alphabet, was second and Facebook ranked third. The 2017 U.S. list also ranked 50 companies. Alphabet captured the top ranking, Amazon was listed as No. 2, and Facebook was No. 3.

LinkedIn's inaugural list in 2016 ranked 40 U.S. companies, with Google earning the No. 1 position, followed by Salesforce and Facebook.

== Lists for other countries ==
- Argentina: LinkedIn's Top Companies for 2022 in Argentina ranked 25 companies, with Accenture appearing as No. 1.
- Australia: LinkedIn's Top Companies for 2022 in Australia ranked 25 companies, with Commonwealth Bank appearing as No. 1.
- Austria: LinkedIn's Top Companies for 2022 in Austria ranked 25 companies, with Raiffeisen Bankengruppe appearing as No. 1.
- Belgium: Linkedin's Top Companies for 2022 in Belgium ranked 25 companies, with BNP Paribas taking the first spot.
- Brazil: Linkedin's Top Companies for 2022 in Brazil ranked 25 companies, with Itaú Unibanco appearing as No. 1.
- Canada: LinkedIn's Top Companies for 2022 in Canada ranked 25 companies, with RBC Bank appearing as No. 1.
- Chile: LinkedIn's Top Companies for 2022 in Chile ranked 25 companies, with Falabella appearing as No. 1.
- Columbia: LinkedIn's Top Companies for 2022 in Columbia ranked 25 companies, with Grupo Aval appearing as No. 1.
- Denmark: LinkedIn's Top Companies for 2022 in Denmark ranked 25 companies, with Novo Nordisk appearing as No. 1.
- Egypt: LinkedIn's Top Companies for 2022 in Egypt ranked 15 companies, with Vodafone Egypt appearing as No. 1.
- France: LinkedIn's Top Companies for 2022 in France ranked 25 companies, with Crédit Agricole appearing as No 1.
- Germany: LinkedIn's Top Companies for 2022 in Germany ranked 25 companies, with Siemens appearing as No 1.
- India: LinkedIn's Top Companies for 2022 in India ranked 25 companies, with Tata Consultancy Services taking the top spot.
- Indonesia: LinkedIn's Top Companies for 2022 in Indonesia ranked 15 companies, with Telkom Indonesia taking the top spot.
- Ireland: LinkedIn's Top Companies for 2022 in Ireland ranked 25 companies, with Accenture taking the top spot.
- Israel: LinkedIn's Top Companies for 2022 in Israel ranked 25 companies, with Intel taking the top spot.
- Italy: LinkedIn's Top Companies for 2022 in Italy ranked 25 companies, with Intesa Sanpaolo taking the first spot.
- Japan: LinkedIn's Top Companies for 2022 in Japan ranked 25 companies, with Rakuten taking the first spot.
- Kenya: LinkedIn's Top Companies for 2022 in Kenya ranked 25 companies, with Safaricom taking the first spot.
- Malaysia: LinkedIn's Top Companies for 2022 in Malaysia ranked 15 companies, with Petronas taking the first spot.
- Mexico: LinkedIn's Top Companies for 2022 in Mexico ranked 25 companies, with IBM at the top of the list.
- The Netherlands: LinkedIn's Top Companies for 2022 in the Netherlands ranked 25 companies, with Rabobank taking the first spot.
- New Zealand: LinkedIn's Top Companies for 2022 in New Zealand ranked 25 companies, with Bank of New Zealand taking the first spot.
- Nigeria: LinkedIn's Top Companies for 2022 in Nigeria ranked 25 companies, with Access Bank taking the first spot.
- The Philippines: LinkedIn's Top Companies for 2022 in the Philippines ranked 15 companies, with Smart Communications taking first spot.
- Portugal: Linkedin's Top Companies for 2022 in Portugal ranked 25 companies, with SONAE appearing as No 1.
- Saudi Arabia: Linkedin's Top Companies for 2022 in Saudi Arabia ranked 15 companies, with Saudi Aramco in the top spot.
- Singapore: LinkedIn's Top Companies for 2022 in Singapore ranked 15 companies, with Unilever taking the top spot.
- South Africa: LinkedIn's Top Companies for 2022 in South Africa ranked 25 companies, with Standard Bank taking the top spot.
- Spain: LinkedIn's Top Companies for 2022 in Spain ranked 25 companies, with NTT taking the top spot.
- Sweden: LinkedIn's Top Companies for 2022 in Sweden ranked 25 companies, with Volvo taking the top spot.
- Switzerland: LinkedIn's Top Companies for 2022 in Switzerland ranked 25 companies, with UBS taking the top spot.
- United Arab Emirates: LinkedIn's Top Companies for 2022 in the UAE ranked 15 companies, with Chalhoub Group highest.
- United Kingdom: LinkedIn's Top Companies for 2022 in the UK ranked 25 companies, with Barclays taking the top spot.

== See also ==
- 100 Best Companies to Work For (Fortune Magazine)
- Glassdoor
