= Ryan Roslansky =

American entrepreneur and CEO of LinkedIn

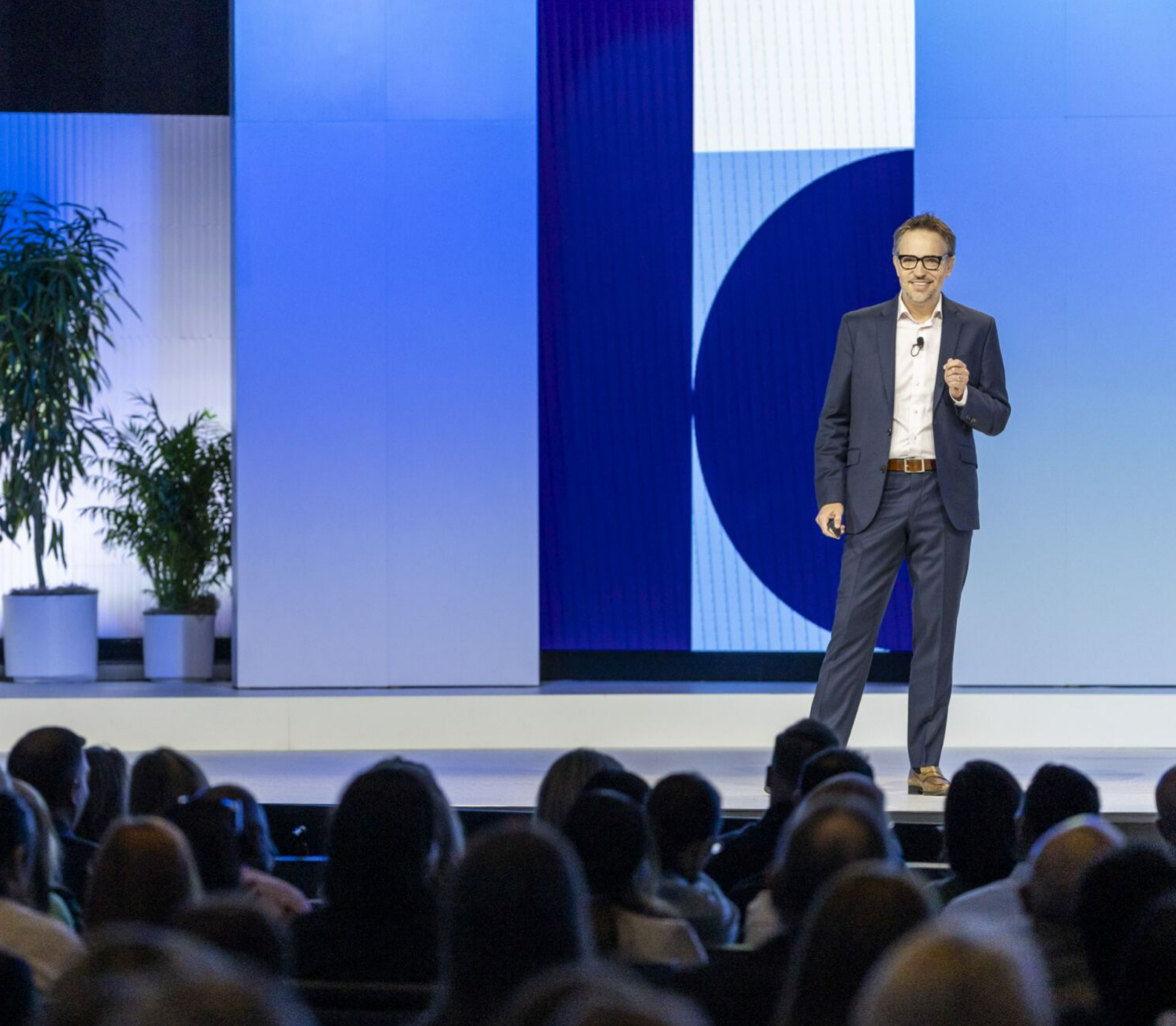
- Roslansky at Talent Connect 2023
- Born: Ryan Roslansky; December 4, 1977 (age 48); South Lake Tahoe, California, U.S.
- Education: University of California, Davis (dropped out)
- Years active: 1997–present
- Title: CEO of LinkedIn
- Board member of: Intuit
- Children: 3

Ryan Roslansky (born December 4, 1977) is an American entrepreneur and oversees the group responsible for LinkedIn and Microsoft Office as a member of Satya Nadella’s senior leadership team at Microsoft. Before taking on the responsibility of Microsoft Office and LinkedIn, he was the chief executive officer (CEO) of LinkedIn. He started with LinkedIn in 2009 and was instrumental in the $1.5 billion acquisition of Lynda.com in 2015, the largest acquisition in LinkedIn's history at that time. He is the co-author of the New York Times Best Selling Book Open to Work and was nominated for an Emmy in 2026 for his video podcast series The Path.

== Early life ==
Ryan Roslansky was born on December 4 1977 in South Lake Tahoe, California. He attended high school at the Nick Bollettieri Tennis Academy in Bradenton, Florida. He attended the University of California, Davis dropping out in his sophomore year to focus full time on a company he and two roommates created. He became CEO of the company, Housing Media, and in 1999 it was acquired by USHousing.com.

== Career ==
After selling his company, Roslansky started at Yahoo!, where he met and worked under Jeff Weiner for five years.

After a short stint at Glam Media, Roslansky went to LinkedIn in 2009 as one of Weiner's first hires.

Roslansky held leadership roles in every part of LinkedIn’s business. He led the evolution of LinkedIn’s products into a global ecosystem and launched several new initiatives for the company including the Influencer program (which includes Richard Branson, Arianna Huffington, and Bill Gates, among others,) and founded the editorial team which today boasts 75+ writers and editors. In 2015, Roslansky was a key part of the $1.5 billion (~$1.99 billion in 2025) acquisition of Lynda.com, the largest acquisition in LinkedIn's history at that time.

Weiner named Roslansky his replacement as LinkedIn CEO on February 5, 2020. As CEO of LinkedIn, Roslansky nearly tripled LinkedIn's business to $19.5 billion in annual revenue, while growing the platform to record levels of engagement, with over 1.3 billion members.

In response to the COVID-19 pandemic, Microsoft and Linkedin pledged to upskill 25 million workers and in 2021, has surpassed that number. However in 2025, LinkedIn admitted that skill certificates rarely pay off.

In 2021, Roslansky partnered with John Kerry on an effort to address Climate Change through a focus on job creation.

In 2025, Microsoft CEO Satya Nadella announced Roslansky would take on broader responsibilities overseeing the Microsoft Office productivity unit, as an Executive Vice President.

== Open to Work ==
In 2026, Roslansky co-published a New York Times best-selling book with Aneesh Raman called Open to Work: How to Get Ahead in the Age of AI focused on helping people navigate their careers in an AI world, published by Harper Collins

== The Path ==
In 2023, Roslansky launched The Path video series on LinkedIn where he interviews business leaders about their career paths.

== The Great Reshuffle ==
In 2021, Roslansky coined the term Great Reshuffle to describe talent shifts occurring through data on the LinkedIn platform.

== Boards and committees ==
Roslansky is on the board of trustees of the Paley Center for Media. He was previously on the board of directors of Intuit, and the board of directors at GoDaddy.

== Awards and recognition ==
In 2026, Roslansky co-authored the book Open to Work which immediately became a New York Times Best Seller. In 2026 Roslansky's video podcast series The Path was nominated for a Daytime Emmy. In 2021, he was named to Forbes CEO Next list.

== Personal life ==
In 2004, Roslansky married Leigh Farmer. The couple have three daughters and live in the San Francisco Bay Area.
