= RaiseMe =

RaiseMe is a for-profit startup founded in August 2014 that allows high school students to input personal academic achievements to qualify themselves for college scholarships. As of January 2019, over 285 universities offered scholarships through RaiseMe. Scholarship money is delegated through "Micro-Scholarships", where dollar amounts are assigned to individual achievements, such as a good grade in a class or club participation. Each participating college determines the value of different accomplishments.
