= Shiftgig =

Professional social network and employment company

- Type: Privately held company
- Industry: Professional services
- Founded: January 2012
- Founder: Eddie Lou, Jeff Pieta, Sean Casey
- Headquarters: Chicago, United States
- Area served: National
- Key people: Rick Bowman (CEO)
- Services: Employment agencies, recruitments
- Website: www.shiftgig.com

Shiftgig was a platform that connected gig workers with employers through a mobile application to claim one-time and recurring jobs in real time.

== History ==
Shiftgig was conceived by entrepreneurs Eddie Lou, Jeff Pieta and Sean Casey. Launched in Chicago in January 2012, the company later expanded throughout the United States.

In October 2012, Shiftgig raised $3 million in its Series A round of funding. In November 2014, the platform raised $10 million from Garland Funds (of Huron Consulting Group) and other Chicago-based investors. In In March 2015, the corporation expanded its services to Dallas

On November 24, 2015, Shiftgig Inc. announced it had raised $22 million in Series B venture funding to expand its mobile marketplace, led by Renren Inc.

Date	Users	Businesses	Source
October 2012	100,000	4,000	Chicago Tribune
December 2013	500,000	14,000	Forbes
March 2015	1.3 million	27,000	Dallas Business Journal

In December 2017, the company was chosen as Innovator of the Year at the 2017 Dive Awards by HR Dive.

In April, 2019, Shiftgig's hospitality and national event staffing markets were acquired by LGC Hospitality and Headway Workforce Solutions. Following that transition, the platform primarily operates as a SaaS company. Its worker engagement platforms, Deploy and BookedOut, continue to operate with their staffing partners.
