= Yevgeniy Nikulin =

Russian computer hacker (born 1987)

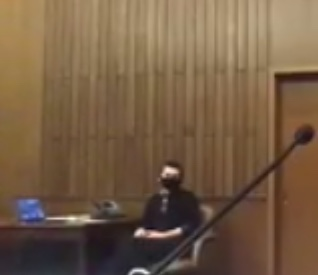
- Nikulin in 2020
- Born: Yevgeniy Alexandrovich Nikulin; 19 October 1987 (age 38)
- Other name: Chinabig.01, dex.007, valeriy.krutov3, itBlackHat
- Citizenship: Russian
- Known for: Hacking
- Status: Released from prison on 24 February 2023
- Convictions: 3 counts of computer intrusion; 2 counts of intentional transmission of information, code, or command causing damage to a protected computer; 2 counts of aggravated identity theft; 1 count of trafficking in unauthorized access devices
- Criminal charges: 3 counts of computer intrusion; 2 counts of intentional transmission of information, code, or command causing damage to a protected computer; 2 counts of aggravated identity theft; 1 count of trafficking in unauthorized access devices; 1 count of conspiracy
- Penalty: 88 months in prison

Yevgeniy Alexandrovich Nikulin (Russian: Евгений Александрович Никулин) is a Russian computer hacker. In October 2016, he was arrested in Prague and was subsequently charged with the hacking and data theft of several U.S. technology companies. In September 2020, he was sentenced to 88 months in prison.

== Hacking career ==
In 2012, Nikulin was alleged to be part of a criminal clique involving a Ukrainian national, Oleksandr Ieremenko.

== Arrest ==
Czech police arrested Nikulin in Prague on 5 October 2016, in connection with the 2012 hacking and data theft of LinkedIn, Dropbox, and Formspring.

According to a report by TV Rain, his arrest may have been the result of a cooperative effort between the U.S. and Sergei Mikhailov (FSB).

U.S. authorities had previously been tipped off about Nikulin in April 2014.

== Detention ==
On 23 November 2016, Russia requested Nikulin's extradition, citing a 2009 case that involved theft from the online payment system WebMoney.

On 7 February 2017, a lawyer for Nikulin claimed that in mid-November 2016, as well as earlier that day, an FBI agent had visited Nikulin in Pankrác Prison and had offered him cash, an apartment, U.S. citizenship, as well as all cyber charges against him dropped, if he would agree to confess to participating in the 2016 Democratic National Committee email leak.

In late March 2018, Paul Ryan visited the Czech capital, where he urged authorities to grant Nikulin's extradition to the U.S.

== Extradition ==
On 30 March 2018, Nikulin was extradited to the U.S., where he pleaded not guilty to the charges against him.

== Conviction ==
On 10 July 2020, Nikulin was convicted by a jury in a United States District Court in San Francisco on all but one of the counts.

== Sentencing ==
On 29 September 2020, Nikulin was sentenced to 88 months in prison.

== Controversy ==
Bryan Paarmaan, who was the then-FBI Deputy Assistant Director in the International Operations Division, admitted to leaking details of Nikulin's indictment to Los Angeles Times reporter, Del Quentin Wilber, two days before Nikulin's indictment was unsealed.
