= List of University of Michigan business alumni =

The parent article is at List of University of Michigan alumni.

Academic unit key
Symbol	Academic unit
ARCH	Taubman College
BUS	Ross School of Business
COE	College of Engineering
DENT	School of Dentistry
GFSPP	Gerald R. Ford School of Public Policy
HHRS	Horace H. Rackham School of Graduate Studies
LAW	Law School
LSA	College of LS&A
MED	Medical School
SMTD	School of Music, Theatre and Dance
PHARM	School of Pharmacy
SED	School of Education
SNRE	School of Natural Resources
SOAD	The Stamps School of Art & Design
SOI	School of Information
SON	School of Nursing
SOK	School of Kinesiology
SOSW	School of Social Work
SPH	School of Public Health
MDNG	Matriculated, did not graduate

This is a list of business alumni from the University of Michigan.

== Founders ==
=== 19th century ===
- John Wesley Emerson, founder and principal investor of the Emerson Electric Company
- George Getty (JD 1882), founder of the George F. Getty, Inc.; incorporated the predecessor of Getty Oil in 1905 with his son J. Paul Getty
- J.J. Hagerman (1857, industrialist who owned mines, railroads and corporate farms in the American West in the late 19th century and early 20th century; one of the most influential men in territorial New Mexico
- Edward Mead Johnson, founder of Mead Johnson; co-founder of Johnson & Johnson
- William James Mayo (MD 1883), one of the founders of the Mayo Clinic along with his brother Charles Horace Mayo
- John Stoughton Newberry (1848), co-founder of the Detroit Car Wheel Company; one of the organizers of the Michigan Car Company, alongside James McMillan
- Benjamin D. Pritchard (LAW: JD), organizer and first president (1870–1905) of the First National Bank of Allegan; founded the First State Bank, which was the first bank in the county to be designated as a state depository, the first savings bank, and the first bank to install safety deposit boxes
- Frederic L. Smith (1890), co-founder of the Olds Motor Works in 1899
- William E. Upjohn (MD 1875), founder and president of The Upjohn Pharmaceutical Company

=== 20th century ===
- Frank Acosta, co-founder of Manhattan Milk, a grocery delivery service
- Ralph Bahna (BA 1964), founder of Club Quarters; CEO of Cunard Line (1980–1989); chairman of Priceline.com (2004–2013)
- Steve Blank (MDNG), founder and/or part of eight Silicon Valley startups
- Henry W. Bloch (BS 1944), co-founder and former president of H&R Block Inc.
- David Bohnett (BUS: MBA 1980), founder and CEO of GeoCities
- Louis Borders (BA 1969), co-founded Borders with brother Tom (MA 1966); founder of Webvan
- Lee Boysel (BSE EE 1962, MSE EE 1963), founder, president, CEO and chairman of Four-Phase Systems
- Leo Burnett (BA 1914), founder of Leo Burnett Company in 1935
- William A. Dart, founder of Dart Container Corporation
- Jason DeYonker, founder and managing partner of Forté Capital Advisors, a private equity firm; board member of Academi
- Dean Drako (COE), founder, president and CEO of Barracuda Networks
- Nneka Egbujiobi, founder of Hello Africa
- Robert Beverley Evans, founder of Evans Industries; chairman of American Motors Corporation
- Edgar N. Gott, co-founder and first president of The Boeing Company; executive at Consolidated Aircraft
- Jacques Habra, founder of WebElite
- Gerrard Wendell "(G.W.)" Haworth (COE: MA), founder and chairman of Haworth, Inc.
- Bill Joy (COE: BSE CompE 1975, 2004 D.Eng. (Hon.)), co-founder of Sun Microsystems
- Elle Kaplan (BA), founder and CEO of LexION Capital Management
- Randall Kaplan, co-founder of Akamai Technologies
- Larry Paul Kelley, founder of Shelby Gem Factory
- John Koza (MA Mathematics 1966; BA 1964, MS 1966, Ph.D. 1972 Computer Science), venture capitalist; co-founder of Scientific Games Corporation, where he co-invented the scratch-off instant lottery ticket
- Warren Lieberfarb (BUS), founder and chairman of Warren N. Lieberfarb & Associates, LLC.; serves on the board of directors of Hughes Telematics, Inc.; board member of Sirius Satellite Radio and thePlatform
- Adam Lilling (BUS), founder of Pentagon CDs and Tapes, Launchpad LA, and Plus Capital
- Charles Edward Merrill (attended Law School 1906–1907 but did not graduate), co-founder of Merrill Lynch
- Jay Randolph Monroe III (LL.B. 1906), founder of the Monroe Calculating Machine Company in 1912
- Ilhan New, founder of La Choy Food Products, Inc. and Yuhan Co, Ltd.
- Kevin O'Connor (COE: BSE EE 1983), co-founder and CEO of DoubleClick Inc.
- Eugene Power (BA 1927, MBA '30, HSCD '71), founder of University Microfilms
- Steve Richardson (BUS: MBA), founder of Stave Puzzles
- Tige Savage (BUS: MBA 1998), co-founder and managing partner of Revolution LLC
- James R. Scapa (BUS: MBA), founder, CEO and chairman of Altair Engineering
- Scott Seligman, founder of the Sterling Bank and Trust, and minority owner of the San Francisco Giants major league baseball team
- Robert Shaye, founder of New Line Cinema
- David R. Walt (BS 1974), co-founder of Illumina, Inc.
- Ari Weinzweig (’78, HLLD'15), founder of Zingerman's
- Ronald Weiser, founder of McKinley Associates Inc., a real estate company based in Ann Arbor
- Gary Wiren (MSc), founder of Golf Around the World and inventor of the Impact Bag

=== 21st century ===
- Jerry White (BUS: MBA 2005), co-founder and executive director of the Landmine Survivors Network

=== Billionaire entrepreneurs ===
- J. Robert Beyster (COE: BSE, MS, Ph.D.), founder, chairman, president, and CEO of Science Applications International Corporation, the predecessor of Leidos Holdings, Inc.
- Bharat Desai (BUS: MBA 1981), co-founder, president, and CEO of Syntel, Inc.
- Stanley Druckenmiller (MDNG: Ph.D., co-founded Duquesne Capital
- Henry Engelhardt (B.A.), founder and chief executive of Admiral Group, a British motor insurance company; billionaire
- Brad Keywell (BUS: BBA 1991; LAW: JD 1993), co-founder and principal of Groupon
- Eric Paul Lefkofsky (BA, J.D. 1993), founder of Tempus AI, and the co-founder of Groupon, Echo Global Logistics, InnerWorkings, and Mediaocean
- Tom S. Monaghan (MDNG), founder and former owner of Domino's Pizza
- Larry Page (COE: BSE 1995), co-founder of Google
- Stephen M. Ross (BUS: BBA 1962), founder and chairman of Related Companies, L.P., a global real estate development firm
- Homer Stryker (MED: M.D. 1925; D. 1980), the founder of Stryker Corporation
- A. Alfred Taubman (MDNG: HLLD 1948), founder of the Taubman Company; his cumulative lifetime donations total roughly $141 million, making him the second largest donor in the university's history
- Preston Robert Tisch (A.B. 1948), co-founder and chairman of the Loews Corporation; former owner of 50% of the New York Giants
- Bruce Wasserstein (AB 1967), CEO of Lazard Freres, founder of Wasserstein Perella & Co.
- Boaz Weinstein (BA 1995), founder of Saba Capital Management
- Ralph Wilson (LAW), founder and owner of the Buffalo Bills
- Sam Wyly (BUS: MBA 1957), founder of University Computing Company, Earth Resources Company, Sterling Software, Maverick Capital, Ranger Capital, and WylyBooks Company
- Samuel Zell (LAW: AB 1963, JD 1966), founder of EQ Office; former chairman of the National Association of Real Estate Investment Trusts
- Niklas Zennström (MDNG), founder of Skype, an internet telephony company

== Heirs and heiresses ==
- Kenneth B. Dart (COE: BSE 1976), heir to Dart Container Corporation; son of the founder William A. Dart; billionaire
- Christopher Ilitch (BUS: BBA 1987), heir to Ilitch Holdings, Inc.; son of the founder Mike Ilitch; billionaire
- Denise Ilitch (BA 1977), heiress to Ilitch Family Companies; president of Ilitch Enterprises, LLC; daughter of Mike Ilitch
- Josiah K. Lilly Jr., heir to Eli Lilly and Company; grandson of the founder Eli Lilly
- Doug Meijer (BS), one of the heirs to Meijer; son of the founder Frederik Meijer; billionaire
- Hank Meijer (BA Literature 1973), one of the heirs to Meijer; oldest son of the founder Frederik Meijer; billionaire
- John Gideon Searle, former vice president and general manager of G. D. Searle & Company; grandson of the founder Gideon Daniel Searle
- Amy Rose Silverman (B.S.), member of the Rose family; co-president of Rose Associates
- Robert J. Vlasic, heir to Vlasic Pickles
- Charles Rudolph Walgreen Jr. (PHC 1928, HMS 1951, HLHD 1992), heir to Walgreens; son of the founder Charles Rudolph Walgreen

== Executives ==
=== Billionaire executives ===
- William Davidson (BUS: BBA 1947), president, chairman and CEO of Guardian Industries
- Bobby Kotick, president and CEO of Activision Blizzard
- Charlie Munger (MDNG), vice chairman of Berkshire Hathaway; name partner at Munger Tolles & Olson
- Ronald L. Olson (JD: Law 1966), name partner at Munger Tolles & Olson; RAND Corporation chairman, board of trustees (former); member of the board of Munger, Tolles & Olson; chairman; member of the board of Berkshire Hathaway (1997-); Council on Foreign Relations board of directors
- Jorge M. Perez (M.U.P 1976), chairman and CEO of Related Companies, L.P.

=== Consumer services ===
- David A. Brandon (AB 1974), chairman of Domino's Pizza; former CEO of Toys "R" Us
- Dave Deno (BUS: MBA), former CEO of Quiznos and former COO of Yum! Brands
- Gregg Kaplan (AB), former president and CEO of Coinstar, which now owns Redbox
- Bernie Moreno (BUS), president of the Collection Auto Group, a car dealership company

=== Consumer non-durables ===
- Frank Legacki, former president and CEO of Kaepa, Inc., an athletic footwear company based in San Antonio, Texas
- Jerry W. Levin (B.S.E), chairman and CEO of Wilton Brands Inc.; chairman and CEO of JW Levin Partners LLC; member of the boards of Ecolab and U.S. Bancorp
- Thomas F. Olin (BA Economics 1952), chairman and co-CEO of Archway Cookies
- Mark Pieloch, president and owner of PF Inc., formerly known as Pet Flavors
- Robert J. Vlasic, CEO and popularizer of Vlasic Pickles

=== Distribution services ===
- Michael Roney (BUS: MBA 1981), former CEO of Bunzl

=== Electronic technology ===
- Greg Joswiak (B.S. CSE 1986), senior vice president of worldwide marketing at Apple Inc

=== Finance ===
- Peter Borish (’81, MPP’82), chairman and CEO of Computer Trading Corporation, an investment and advisory firm
- Adam Kobeissi (BBA 2020), Founder and Editor in Chief of the Kobeissi Letter
- Edward Conard (BSE 1978), founding partner at Bain Capital
- William S. Demchak, (BUS: MBA), president and CEO of PNC Financial Services
- Haluk Dinçer (BUS: MBA), executive board member of Sabanci Holding; president of the Retail and Insurance Group of Sabancı Holding
- John C. Dugan, chairman of Citigroup
- Euh Yoon-Dae (BUS: Ph.D.), chairman of KB Financial Group and of the Presidential Council on Nation Branding, Korea
- David S. Evans (BGS), chairman and chief investment officer of Glencoe Capital, a private equity firm
- Mark N. Greene (MA, Ph.D. in economics), CEO and member of the board of FICO (Fair Isaac Corporation) since 2007
- David Kellermann, (BUS: BSBA), chief financial officer of Freddie Mac
- Timothy J. Sloan, former CEO of Wells Fargo
- Thomas J. Wilson (BS 1970), chairman and CEO of Allstate Insurance, Incorporated

=== Government corporations ===
- L. William Seidman (BUS: MBA 1949), former 14th chairman of the Federal Deposit Insurance Corporation (FDIC); vice chairman and CFO of the Phelps Dodge Corporation (1977–1982); managing partner of Seidman & Seidman (1968–1974); Chief Commentator of CNBC

=== Not-for-profit ===
- Dale Carlson (SPH: MA), first chief communications officer for the California Institute for Regenerative Medicine
- John M. Fahey, Jr., (BUS: MBA 1975), president and CEO of the National Geographic Society; former chairman, president and CEO of Time Life Inc.
- William D. Johnson (BUS: MBA), principal of In-Q-Tel
- La June Montgomery Tabron (BUS: BBA), president and CEO of the Kellogg Foundation

=== Manufacturing ===
- John V. Faraci (BUS: MBA 1974), former CEO of International Paper
- Frederick Henderson, former president and CEO of General Motors
- James Hackett, former president and CEO of Ford Motor Company
- C. Robert Kidder (COE: BS IE 1967), former chairman of Chrysler Group LLC; former CEO of Borden Chemical 1995–2002; Principal, Stonehenge Partners, Inc., since 2004; former lead director of Morgan Stanley; ran 3Stone Advisors, a Columbus, Ohio, investment firm focusing on clean technology start-ups
- Timothy M. Manganello (BSME 1972, MSME 1975), former chairman and CEO of BorgWarner; member of the Board of BorgWarner (2002-, as chairman, 2003-)
- Mervin Pregulman, former president and CEO of Siskin Steel & Supply Co. in Chattanooga, Tennessee
- Stephen Sanger (BUS: MBA 1970), former CEO of General Mills; former chairman of Wells Fargo; director of Target Corporation, and Pfizer
- Roger Smith, former chairman and CEO of General Motors Corporation 1981–1990
- David N. Weidman (BUS: MBA 1980), former CEO of Celanese; member of the board of Celanese (2004–, as chairman, 2007–); chairman of Society of Chemical Industry
- Irma Wyman, first female CIO of Honeywell, Inc.
- Jerry York, former CFO of IBM and Chrysler; former chairman, president and CEO of Harwinton Capital; former CEO of Micro Warehouse

=== Retail trade ===
- Charles "Chuck" Conaway (BUS: MBA), former president and chief operating officer of CVS Corporation; former CEO of Kmart
- Stephenie Landry, vice president of Amazon
- Tom Lewand, former CEO of Shinola, a Detroit-based leather and watch company
- Marc Rosen (BUS: BBA '90), CEO of JCPenney

=== Sports ===
- Sam Belnavis (BUS: MBA), executive in automobile racing; as an African-American, one of the few minority persons to have owned a NASCAR racing team
- Tom Garfinkel (BUS: MBA), vice chairman, president and CEO of the Miami Dolphins and Hard Rock Stadium and managing partner of the Formula One Miami Grand Prix
- Howard Handler (LSA: BA 1983; BUS: MBA 1985), president of 313 Presents
- Patrick LaForge, president and CEO of the Edmonton Oilers

=== Technology services ===
- Jim Buckmaster, president and CEO of Craigslist
- Dick Costolo (BA), former COO and former CEO of Twitter; founder of Feedburner, the RSS reader bought by Google in 2007
- Paul Saleh (BS, MS; BUS: MBA 1985), former chief financial officer of Computer Sciences Corporation (which became DXC Technology in 2017); board member of Anterix; former chief financial officer of Gannett; former chief financial officer and executive vice president of Nextel Communications Inc.; former chief financial officer of Sprint Nextel Corporation
- Richard Snyder (BA 1977, BUS: MBA with distinction 1979, LAW: JD 1982, certified public accountant), CEO of SensCy, a cybersecurity company based in Ann Arbor, Michigan
- Stephen Swad, former president and CEO of Rosetta Stone Inc.; former executive vice president and chief financial officer of Fannie Mae; former executive vice president and chief financial officer of AOL

=== Transportation ===
- Dave Barger, president and chief operating officer of JetBlue; CEO as of 2007
- Dmitri Dolgov (Ph.D.), co-chief executive officer of Waymo, an autonomous driving technology company
- Robert Isom, CEO of American Airlines
- Temel Kotil (COE: MA 1986, MA 1987, Ph.D. 1991), CEO of Turkish Airlines

=== Defunct ===
- Donald N. Frey (BS MTL 1947, MSE 1949, PhD 1951, D. Eng. hon. 1967), former chairman and CEO of Bell & Howell
- Archie McCardell (BUS: MBA), former CEO, president, and chairman of the board at the International Harvester
- Herbert "Bart" H. McDade III, president and COO of Lehman Brothers at the time of its bankruptcy
- William J. Olcott, president of the Oliver Iron Mining Company 1909–1928; president of the Duluth, Missabe and Iron Range Railway 1901–1909

== Others ==
- Paul Kangas, figure on Nightly Business Report on PBS (1979–2009; anchor 1990–2009)
- Mark Madoff, son of Ponzi scheme fraudster Bernard Madoff
- William Andrew Paton, first editor of The Accounting Review
