= Vlašić =

Vlašić (pronounced [ʋlâʃitɕ]) is a Serbo-Croatian toponym and surname. It may refer to:

- Vlašić (Bosnia and Herzegovina), a mountain near Travnik
- Vlašić (Serbia), a mountain near Valjevo
- Vlašić (surname), a Croatian surname
- Vlašić cheese, a brined mostly low-fat white cheese made from sheep-milk
- Vlasic Pickles, a company specializing in pickled products

== See also ==
- Wlassics, in Hungarian
- Nikolai Vlasik, Soviet general
