= Tech:NYC =

Nonprofit advocacy group based in New York City

- Founded: May 2016
- Founders: Fred Wilson (financier), Tim Armstrong (executive), Julie Samuels
- Purpose: Advocates for policies that support the growth of technology companies and technology talent in NYC; promotes inclusion and diversity
- Location: New York City
- Website: technyc.org

Tech:NYC, founded in 2016, is a New York City-based non profit organization that represents the city's technology industry with government, civic institutions, business, and media. Its primary goals are to attract tech talent to the city and to advocate for policies that will help tech companies grow.

== History and Founding ==
Tech:NYC was founded in May 2016 by venture capitalist Fred Wilson of Union Square Ventures, Tim Armstrong (then CEO of AOL), and Julie Samuels, who had previously served as executive director of Engine, a national nonprofit focused on startup policy. The founding companies included AOL, Bloomberg L.P., and Union Square Ventures.

The organization launched as New York's technology sector was experiencing significant growth, with city start-ups ranking second only to Silicon Valley in venture capital funding. Within its first year, Tech:NYC had established itself as in influential presence in New York politics.

== Leadership ==
Julie Samuels is the President and CEO of Tech:NYC. Before founding Tech:NYC, Samuels served as executive director of Engine, and before that, as a senior staff attorney at the Electronic Frontier Foundation, where she held the Mark Cuban Chair to Eliminate Stupid Patents.

Under Samuels' leadership, Tech:NYC has become a key intermediary between New York City's tech industry and its government, with Samuels described by New York Magazine as "the person most responsible for preventing all-out tech-versus-government warfare" in the city.

In 2026, Samuels was included in City & State's Albany Power 100, and has appeared or published op-eds in the The New York Daily News, New York Post, Fortune, Bloomberg, the Wall Street Journal, Crain's New York Business, and Politico, among other outlets.

=== Board of Directors ===
Tech:NYC is governed by a board of directors whose members include executives and founders from across New York's technology and venture capital communities. Notable members include Neil Blumenthal, co-founder and CEO of Warby Parker; Jay Carney, former White House Press Secretary and Global Head of Policy and Communications at Airbnb; Reshma Saujani, founder of Girls Who Code and Moms First; Scott Belsky, entrepreneur, author, and founder of Behance; Kate Ryder, founder and CEO of Maven Clinic; and Susan Lyne, co-founder and partner of BBG Ventures. Fred Wilson, co-founder and partner of Union Square Ventures, was among the organization's original founders and served as the first board chair.

== Advocacy ==
Tech:NYC advocates for a tech-friendly regulatory environment at the city and state levels.

=== U.S. immigration Policy ===
Tech:NYC has advocated for a continuation of previous immigration policies at a time when government leaders favor more restrictions on who is allowed to work in the United States. The organization also launched a campaign called Tech Takes Action in September 2017 to rally support for immigrants who qualified for Deferred Action for Childhood Arrivals.

=== Net neutrality ===
When the FCC announced plans to roll back net neutrality protections that were implemented in 2015, Tech:NYC advocated against the move, calling for continuation of current practices. Additionally, it worked with Senator Chuck Schumer to support a Congressional Review Act in the U.S. Senate to restore net neutrality protections.

=== Amazon HQ2 ===
In 2017, Amazon announced a national competition inviting cities across North America to submit bids to host its second headquarters, known as HQ2. New York City submitted a bid, and in January 2018 was named one of 20 finalists. Tech:NYC was a vocal supporter of New York's bid.

In November 2018, Amazon announced it would split HQ2 between Long Island City, Queens and Crystal City, Virginia. Tech:NYC characterized the withdrawal as a setback for New York's standing as a destination for large-scale tech investment.

=== Artificial Intelligence ===
Tech:NYC has been a supporter of the Empire AI Consortium, announced by Governor Kathy Hochul in January 2024 as a public-private initiative backed by more than $400 million in funding, with an AI computing center established at the University at Buffalo. In January 2026, Samuels wrote in the New York Daily News that Governor Hochul "is a power player in AI," and appeared on NY1 to discuss AI's implications for New York schools and the workforce. In March 2026, she published an op-ed in Crain's New York Business outlining how New York can maintain its leadership in tech innovation.

=== AI Data Center Moratorium ===
In June 2026, the New York State Legislature passed a bill imposing a one-year moratorium on permits for new data centers drawing 20 megawatts or more, along with new labor, energy, and environmental requirements. Samuels publicly urged Governor Hochul to veto the bill.

=== Qualified Small Business (QSBS) Exemption (2026) ===
In March 2026, New York state lawmakers advanced a proposal to eliminate a federal tax exclusion on capital gains from certain startups investments - a move that drew opposition from the tech and venture capital community. Tech:NYC sent a letter with 1,100 signatures to state legislators in opposition. On March 26, New York State Senate Majority spokesperson Mike Murphy told Politico that the measure was not expected to be in the final budget.

=== Autonomous vehicles ===
Tech:NYC has supported the development of autonomous vehicle technology in New York. As New York State considered funding for self-driving car testing, the organization backed continued AV development. In 2026, after Governor Hochul rolled back a planned expansion of Waymo's operations following pressure from taxi driver unions, Tech:NYC continued to engage on AV policy.

=== NYC Mayoralty and the Mamdani Administration ===
Following Zohran Mamdani's election as New York City mayor in November 2025, Tech:NYC worked to establish a productive relationship with the incoming administration. Samuels appeared on Bloomberg TV shortly after the election, with support for working with Mamdani. She joined the Newcomer podcast in March 2026 to discuss the tensions between the tech sector and progressive politics, including debates around wealth taxes, data center energy demands, and efforts to modernize city government with technology.

In a February 206 op-ed in the New York Daily News, Samuels urged Mamdani to use technology as a tool to address the city's affordability crisis. In April 2026, she wrote a separate op-ed calling for New York City homes to be permitted to operate as short-term rentals during the 2026 FIFA World Cup.

== Programs and Initiatives ==
Decoded Futures is an artificial intelligence program run by the Tech:NYC Foundation. The program trains cohorts of about 25 nonprofits over an eight-week period, pairing each organization with a technology mentor to work on projects. It has been supported by the Robin Hood Foundation, Google.org, and other technology companies. Over its first year of programming, the initiative served more than 220 New York City nonprofits. Through the initiative, the Robin Hood Foundation has reported building AI capacity across 115 education and workforce nonprofits. Participants have included Welcome to Chinatown, a Bowery nonprofit that used the program to build AI tools for neighborhood surveys and event management.

=== Research and Data ===
Tech:NYC collaborated on a May 2025 report on the city's technology sector, produced with the think tank Center for an Urban Future, which found that the sector accounted for 41 percent of the roughly 104,000 net new jobs created in New York City between 2019 and 2024. An earlier report with the same think tank, New York's New Jobs Engine (2022), reported its finding that the tech sector accounted for about 17 percent of the city job growth since 2010. In 2024, Axios reported on a survey of 500 New York executives that Accenture conducted in partnership with Tech:NY, which estimated that 97% of executives surveyed believe AI will have a "net positive impact" on society.
