= Analysis of daylight saving time =

Aspect of timekeeping

Daylight saving time (DST) is the practice of advancing clocks during warmer months so that darkness falls later each day according to the clock.

Proponents of DST generally argue that it saves energy, promotes outdoor leisure activity in the evening (in summer), and therefore is good for physical and psychological health, reduces traffic accidents, reduces crime or is good for business.

Opponents argue that DST disrupts human circadian rhythms (negatively impacting human health in the process), that it increases fatal traffic collisions, that the actual energy savings are inconclusive, and that DST increases health risks such as heart attack. Farmers have tended to oppose DST.

Having a common agreement about the day's layout or schedule has so many advantages that a standard schedule over whole countries or large areas has generally been chosen over efforts in which some people get up earlier and others do not. The advantages of coordination are so great that many people ignore whether DST is in effect by altering their work schedules to coordinate with television broadcasts or daylight. DST is commonly not observed during most of winter, because the days are shorter then; workers may have no sunlit leisure time, and students may need to leave for school in the dark.

== Energy use ==
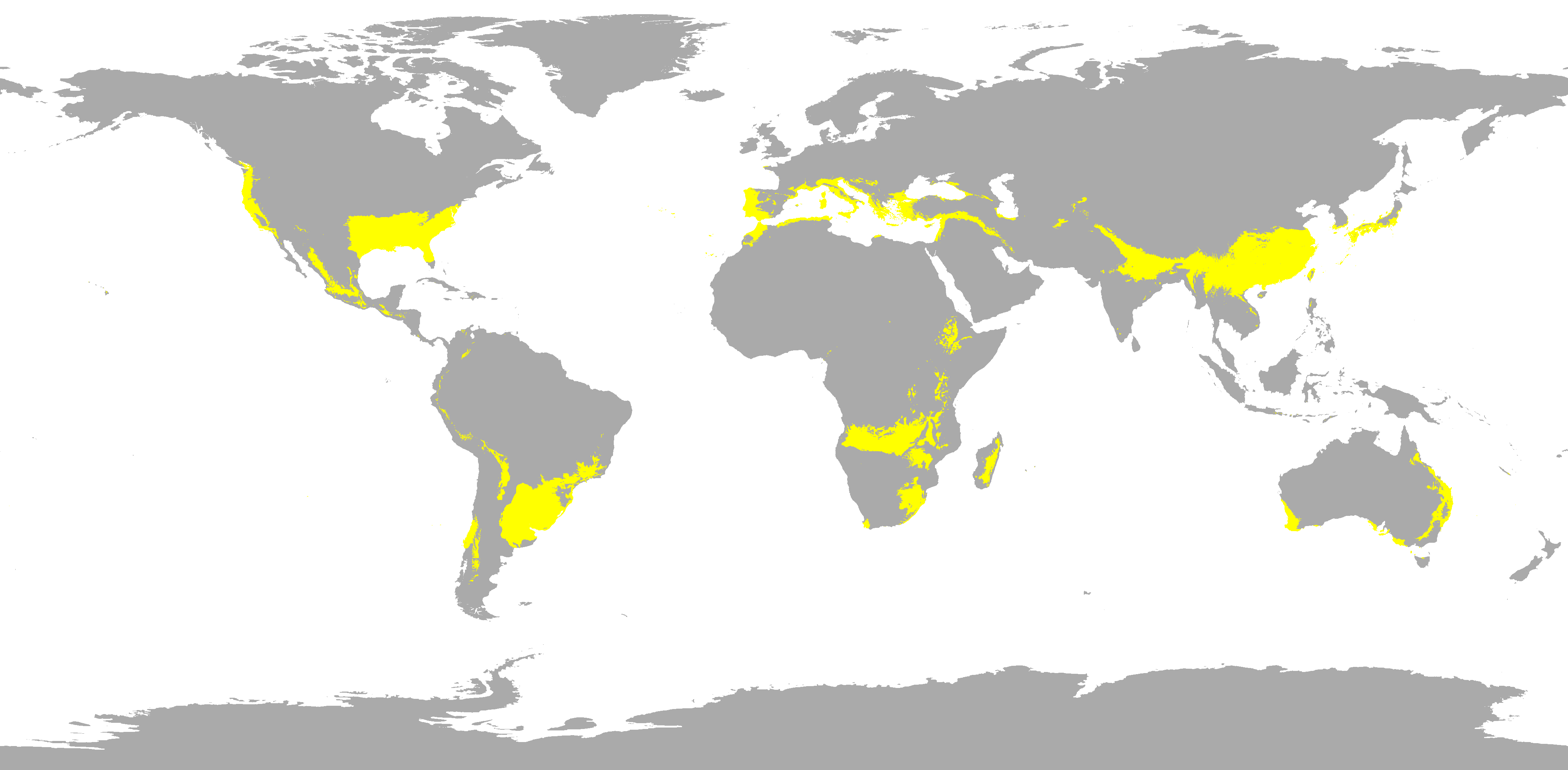
Subtropical climates are highlighted in yellow on this map. People living in these areas may consume more energy as a result of DST.

A 2017 meta-analysis of 44 studies found that DST leads to electricity savings of 0.3% during the days when DST applies. The meta-analysis furthermore found that "electricity savings are larger for countries farther away from the equator, while subtropical regions consume more electricity because of DST." This means that DST may conserve electricity in some countries, such as Canada and the United Kingdom, but be wasteful in other places, such as Mexico, the southern United States, and northern Africa. The savings in electricity may also be offset by extra use of other types of energy, such as heating fuel.

The period of daylight saving time before the longest day is shorter than the period after, in several countries including the United States of America, in areas that observe daylight saving time, and Europe. For example, in the U.S. the period of daylight saving time is defined by the Energy Policy Act of 2005. The period for daylight saving time was extended by changing the start date from the first Sunday of April to the second Sunday of March and changing the end date from the last Sunday in October to the first Sunday in November.

DST's potential to save energy comes primarily from its effects on residential lighting, which consumes about 3.5% of electricity in the United States and Canada. (For comparison, air conditioning uses 16.5% of energy in the United States.) Delaying the nominal time of sunset and sunrise reduces the use of artificial light in the evening and increases it in the morning. However, approaching extreme latitudes, even with DST, the days are long enough that most people wake up after sunrise. An early goal of DST was to reduce evening usage of incandescent lighting, once a primary use of electricity. Although energy conservation remains an important goal, energy usage patterns have greatly changed since then. Electricity use is greatly affected by geography, climate, and economics, so the results of a study conducted in one place may not be relevant to another country or climate.

- In the United States, research indicates that DST reduces residential lighting costs but usually increases total energy consumption, especially when non-electricity sources of energy consumption are considered. These non-electricity sources of energy consumption include extra heating fuel on the colder, darker mornings and extra gasoline used to drive to shopping and sporting activities. In some cases, DST increases residential electricity consumption, such as when people use more air conditioning in the longer, hotter evenings.
- A 2007 study estimated that winter daylight saving would prevent a 2% increase in average daily electricity consumption in Great Britain. This paper was revised in October 2009.
- In 2000, when parts of Australia began DST in late winter, overall electricity consumption did not change, but the morning peak load and prices increased. The overall consumption was the same because people used more electricity in the dark mornings, and correspondingly less electricity in the brighter evenings. In Western Australia during summer 2006–2007, DST increased electricity consumption during hotter days and decreased it during cooler days, with consumption rising 0.6% overall.
- Although a 2007 study estimated that introducing DST to Japan would reduce household lighting energy consumption, a 2007 simulation estimated that DST would increase overall energy use in Osaka residences by 0.1%, with a <0.1% decrease due to less lighting more than outweighed by a 0.2% increase due to extra cooling; neither study examined non-residential energy use. This is probably because DST's effect on lighting energy use is mainly noticeable in residences.
- Climate change was found to affect the impact of office energy use. Daylight saving time reduces cooling more than it increases heating and its impact on cooling and heating energy demand depends on the geographical location, which determines the amount and temporal pattern of cooling and heating demand.

Several studies have suggested that DST increases motor fuel consumption. The 2008 DOE report found no significant increase in motor gasoline consumption due to the 2007 United States extension of DST.

== Economic effects ==
Those who benefit most from DST are the retailers, sporting goods makers, and other businesses that benefit from extra afternoon sunlight. Having more hours of sunlight in between the end of the typical workday and bedtime induces customers to shop and to participate in outdoor afternoon sports. People are more likely to stop by a store on their way home from work if the sun is still up. In 1984, Fortune magazine estimated that a seven-week extension of DST would yield an additional $30 million for 7-Eleven stores, and the National Golf Foundation estimated the extension would increase golf industry revenues $200 million to $300 million. A 1999 study estimated that DST increases the revenue of the European Union's leisure sector by about 3%.

Conversely, DST can harm some farmers, and others whose hours are set by the sun. One reason why farmers oppose DST is that grain is best harvested after dew evaporates, so when field hands arrive and leave earlier in summer, their labor is less valuable. Dairy farmers are another group who complain of the change. Their cows are sensitive to the timing of milking, so delivering milk earlier disrupts their systems. Today some farmers' groups are in favor of DST.

Children and teenagers often have difficulty getting enough sleep at night when the evenings are bright.

DST also hurts prime-time television broadcast ratings, drive-ins and other theaters.

Changing clocks and DST rules has a direct economic cost, entailing extra work to support remote meetings, computer applications and the like. For example Utah State University economist William F. Shughart II has estimated the lost opportunity cost at around US$1.7 billion. Although it has been argued that clock shifts correlate with decreased economic efficiency, and that in 2000 the daylight-saving effect implied an estimated one-day loss of $31 billion on U.S. stock exchanges, the estimated numbers depend on the methodology. The results have been disputed, and the original authors have refuted the points raised by disputers.

== Public safety ==
In 1975 the United States Department of Transportation (DOT) conservatively identified a 0.7% reduction in traffic fatalities during DST, and estimated the real reduction at 1.5% to 2.0%, but the 1976 NBS review of the DOT study found no differences in traffic fatalities. In 1995 the Insurance Institute for Highway Safety estimated a reduction of 1.2%, including a 5.0% reduction in crashes fatal to pedestrians. Others have found similar reductions. Single/Double Summer Time (SDST), a variant where clocks are one hour ahead of the sun in winter and two in summer, has been projected to reduce traffic fatalities by 3% to 4% in the UK, compared to ordinary DST. However, accidents do increase by as much as 11% during the two weeks that follow the end of British Summer Time. Likewise in the United States, vehicular collisions with deer increase, purportedly by 16%, in the week after the end of Daylight Saving Time. It is not clear whether sleep disruption contributes to fatal accidents immediately after the spring clock shifts. A correlation between clock shifts and traffic accidents has been observed in North America and the UK but not in Finland or Sweden. Four reports have found that this effect is smaller than the overall reduction in traffic fatalities. In 2022, a driving simulator study documented a significant worsening of several driving performance indicators in the week after the spring transition to DST. A 2009 U.S. study found that on Mondays after the switch to DST, workers sleep an average of 40 minutes less, and are injured at work more often and more severely.

DST likely reduces some kinds of crime, such as robbery and sexual assault, as fewer potential victims are outdoors after dusk. Artificial outdoor lighting has a marginal and sometimes even contradictory influence on crime and fear of crime.

In several countries, fire safety officials encourage citizens to use the two annual clock shifts as reminders to replace batteries in smoke and carbon monoxide detectors, particularly in autumn, just before the heating and candle season causes an increase in home fires. Similar twice-yearly tasks include reviewing and practicing fire escape and family disaster plans, inspecting vehicle lights, checking storage areas for hazardous materials, reprogramming thermostats, and seasonal vaccinations. Locations without DST can instead use the first days of spring and autumn as reminders.

A 2017 study in the American Economic Journal: Applied Economics estimated that "the transition into DST caused over 30 deaths at a social cost of $275 million annually," primarily by increasing sleep deprivation.

Using a large US database of 732,835 fatal motor vehicle accidents (MVA) recorded from 1996 to 2017, Fritz et al. (2019) found a 6% increase in fatal MVA risk in the workweek following the spring transition to DST, which was more pronounced in the morning and in places that are further west within a time zone. There were no effects of the fall-back transition to standard time (ST) on MVA risk, supporting the hypothesis that circadian misalignment and sleep deprivation underlie MVA risk increases.

In March 2020, the Israeli government planned to delay daylight saving in order to discourage gatherings during the COVID-19 pandemic. However, it was decided this would be too technically difficult to implement at such short notice.

== Health ==
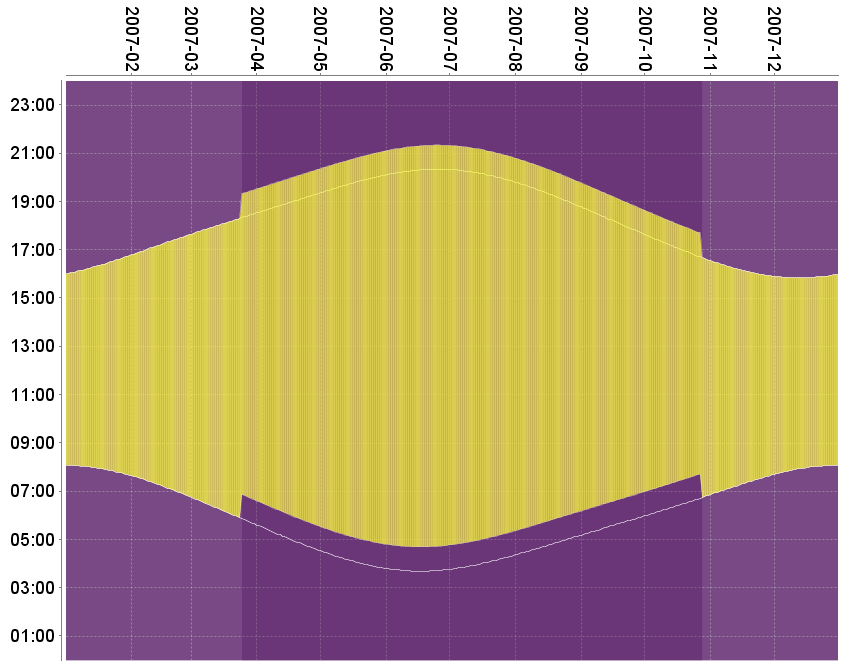
Clock shifts affecting apparent sunrise and sunset times at Greenwich in 2007

Experts in circadian rhythms and sleep have warned about the negative health implications of DST. DST reduces sleep time and causes an increased mismatch between the body clock and local time, a condition called social jetlag. Both sleep deprivation and social jetlag have been associated with negative effects on physical and mental health outcomes, including increased risks for diabetes, obesity, heart disease, depression, and some forms of cancer. Year-round standard time has been proposed as the preferred option for public health and safety.

In societies with fixed work schedules DST provides more afternoon sunlight for outdoor exercise. It alters sunlight exposure depending on one's location and daily schedule, as sunlight triggers vitamin D synthesis in the skin, but overexposure can lead to skin cancer. DST may help in depression by causing individuals to rise earlier, but some argue the reverse. The Retinitis Pigmentosa Foundation Fighting Blindness, chaired by blind sports magnate Gordon Gund, successfully lobbied in 1985 and 2005 for U.S. DST extensions. DST shifts are associated with higher rates of ischemic stroke in the first two days after the shift, though not in the week thereafter.

Clock shifts were found to increase the risk of heart attack by 10 percent, and to disrupt sleep and reduce its efficiency. Effects on seasonal adaptation of the circadian rhythm can be severe and last for weeks. A 2008 study found that although male suicide rates rise in the weeks after the spring transition, the relationship weakened greatly after adjusting for season. A 2008 Swedish study found that heart attacks were significantly more common the first three weekdays after the spring transition, and significantly less common the first weekday after the autumn transition. A 2013 review found little evidence that people slept more on the night after the fall DST shift, even though it is often described as allowing people to sleep for an hour longer than normal. The same review stated that the lost hour of sleep resulting from the spring shift appears to result in sleep loss for at least a week afterward. Even so, a 2014 study conducted in the United States showed that heart attacks decreased significantly after the fall DST shift.

The government of Kazakhstan cited health complications due to clock shifts as a reason for abolishing DST in 2005. In March 2011, Dmitri Medvedev, president of Russia, claimed that "stress of changing clocks" was the motivation for Russia to stay in DST all year long. Officials at the time talked about an annual increase in suicides.

An unexpected adverse effect of daylight saving time may lie in the fact that an extra part of morning rush hour traffic occurs before dawn and traffic emissions then cause higher air pollution than during daylight hours.

In 2017, researchers at the University of Washington and the University of Virginia reported that judges who experienced sleep deprivation as a result of DST tended to issue longer sentences.

In 2025, a Stanford study compared the year-long circadian health impact of permanent Standard Time, permanent Daylight Saving Time, and biannually switching in the continental U.S. using models of the human circadian rhythm and health data from the CDC Places dataset. Researchers found that switching to permanent Standard Time was predicted to reduce cases of obesity by 2.6 million cases and stroke by 300,000 cases. Permanent Daylight Saving Time also reduced cases but to a lesser extent. In interviews, the authors caution that this work is from a circadian health perspective and that other factors should be considered in policy decisions such as economic and safety impacts of time policy.

== Complexity and disadvantages ==
DST's clock shifts have the obvious disadvantage of complexity. People must remember to change their clocks; this can be time-consuming, particularly for mechanical clocks that cannot be moved backward safely. People who work across time zone boundaries need to keep track of multiple DST rules, as not all locations observe DST or observe it the same way. The length of the calendar day becomes variable; it is no longer always 24 hours. Disruption to meetings, travel, broadcasts, billing systems, and records management is common, and can be expensive. During an autumn transition from 02:00 to 01:00, a clock reads times from 01:00:00 through 01:59:59 twice, possibly leading to confusion.

Lists of time zones and time differences usually do not include daylight saving time, as that is considered complicated and would mean different times over the seasons of the year. For example, UK is usually listed as UTC±00:00, Japan as UTC+09:00, and Sydney as UTC+10:00. But in January, Sydney observes UTC+11:00, and in July, UK observes UTC+01:00, so the differences between all these countries vary during the year. Since lists avoid taking complicated daylight saving time into account, they give wrong information about actual time.

Damage to a German steel facility occurred during a DST transition in 1993, when a computer timing system linked to a radio time synchronization signal allowed molten steel to cool for one hour less than the required duration, resulting in spattering of molten steel when it was poured. Medical devices may generate adverse events that could harm patients, without being obvious to clinicians responsible for care. These problems are compounded when the DST rules themselves change; software developers must test and perhaps modify many programs, and users must install updates and restart applications. Consumers must update devices such as programmable thermostats with the correct DST rules or manually adjust the devices' clocks. A common strategy to resolve these problems in computer systems is to express time using the Coordinated Universal Time with no offset (UTC±00:00; which, depending on time of year, is not always the same as hour as London time) rather than the local time zone. For example, Unix-based computer systems use the UTC-based Unix time internally.

Some clock-shift problems could be avoided by adjusting clocks continuously or at least more gradually—for example, Willett at first suggested weekly 20-minute transitions—but this would add complexity and has never been implemented.

DST inherits and can magnify the disadvantages of standard time. For example, when reading a sundial, one must compensate for it along with time zone and natural discrepancies. Also, sun-exposure guidelines such as avoiding the sun within two hours of noon become less accurate when DST is in effect.
