= M. Bridget Duffy =

Mary Bridget Duffy is an American businessperson. Involved in hospitalist medicine, she was previously the chief medical officer of Vocera Communications. Prior to that, she founded and was CEO of the company ExperiaHealth.

== Early life and education ==
Duffy attended medical school at the University of Minnesota. She later completed her residency in internal medicine at Abbott Northwestern Hospital in Minneapolis, Minnesota.

== Career ==
Early in her career she was chief experience officer (CXO) of the Cleveland Clinic. Involved in hospitalist medicine, she launched programs focused on the field of integrative and heart-brain medicine, and helped establish the Earl and Doris Bakken Heart Brain Institute. She co-founded and was CEO of ExperiaHealth, which was acquired by the health company Vocera Communications in 2010. After the acquisition, Duffy became the chief medical officer (CMO) of Vocera. In 2014, she remained CMO of Vocera, authoring papers on healthcare for publications such as Becker's Hospital Review. She has been a speaker on health topics such as patient experience. As of 2024 she also serves on the advisory boards of Maven Clinic, and was previously on the board of Velano Vascular, Rock Health and Children's HeartLink.

== Accolades ==
She earned the Quantum Leap Award for spurring change in the field of medicine, and HealthLeaders magazine named her one of “20 People Who Make Healthcare Better” in 2008. In 2014, Duffy was named a “Health IT Change Agent” by Health IT Outcomes. In 2015, she was named “Woman of the Year” by Women Health Care Executives and listed as one of the "Most Influential Women in Bay Area Business for 2015" by the San Francisco Business Times. Duffy was named a “Women of Influence” by the Silicon Valley Business Journal in 2017.

== See also ==
- List of Internet entrepreneurs
