= SWAD =

Swad or SWAD may refer to:

- Antonio Swad, the founder of Pizza Patrón chain
- Stephen Swad, a CEO of Rosetta Stone company
- Swad, a resident of Swadlincote, Derbyshire, England
- Swanlinbar, a village in County Cavan, Ireland, colloquially known as Swad
- SWAD, the main Indian food brand of Raja Foods LLC
- Semantic Web Advanced Development, an EU project
- SWAD (software), manages courses etc. in educational institutions
- Swimmers With a Disability, a category of swimming sports events
