= Progyny =

American fertility-benefits company

Progyny, Inc.
- Formerly: Auxogen Bioscience, Inc. (2008–2010); Auxogyn, Inc. (2010–2015)
- Type: Public
- Traded as: Nasdaq: PGNY; S&P 600 component
- Industry: Health care
- Founded: April 3, 2008; 18 years ago
- Headquarters: New York City, United States
- Area served: United States
- Key people: Peter Anevski (CEO)
- Services: Fertility, family-building and women's-health benefits; pharmacy benefits
- Revenue: US$1.289 billion (2025)
- Net income: US$58.5 million
- Number of employees: 856 (2025)
- Website: progyny.com

Progyny, Inc. is an American benefits-management company that administers employer-sponsored fertility, family-building and women's-health benefits. The company began offering fertility benefits in 2016. It completed an initial public offering on the Nasdaq in 2019. In 2024, it was described as a pioneer in the field and the only publicly traded fertility-benefits company in the United States.

Progyny's services include fertility-treatment benefits, a network of health-care providers, patient-support services and the Progyny Rx pharmacy-benefits program. The company is headquartered in New York City.

== History ==
The company was incorporated in Delaware in April 2008 as Auxogen Bioscience, Inc. It changed its name to Auxogyn, Inc. in 2010 and to Progyny, Inc. in 2015.

Before 2015, the company operated as a reproductive-medicine medical-device business. Its principal product was the Early Embryo Viability Assessment test, known as Eeva, which was used to help clinicians assess embryos during in vitro fertilization.

Progyny acquired Fertility Authority, an online fertility-information company, in March 2015 and began developing a fertility-benefits business alongside its medical-device operation. It launched its employer fertility-benefits service in 2016 with five clients. In January 2018, Progyny sold the Eeva business to Ares Trading, a subsidiary of Merck Serono, making fertility-benefits management its principal business. It introduced Progyny Rx, a pharmacy-benefits service, in 2018.

Progyny completed its initial public offering in October 2019. The company sold 6.7 million shares at $13 per share, while existing shareholders sold an additional 4.8 million shares. The Wall Street Journal described the offering as a first for the emerging generation of fertility-services startups. At the time of the company's IPO filing, Progyny was already profitable, with revenue of $103 million and a profit of $4 million during the first half of 2019.

== Business and services ==
Progyny contracts with employers and other plan sponsors to administer fertility and family-building benefits for employees and their covered dependents. The company acts as an intermediary between employers, patients and fertility-care providers. Its role is to manage fertility coverage on behalf of employers rather than to operate fertility clinics directly.

The company's fertility benefit is organized around treatment packages called Smart Cycles. The packages may include diagnostic testing, fertility procedures and access to a network of fertility specialists. Members are also assigned care advocates who provide information, scheduling assistance and support during treatment. Progyny Rx manages fertility-related prescription drug benefits through specialty pharmacies.

Progyny also administers employer reimbursement programs for services such as adoption, surrogacy, doula care and travel required to receive medical treatment. The company has expanded its services into pregnancy and postpartum support, parenting and child well-being, and menopause and midlife care.

The expansion of Progyny occurred amid increased adoption of fertility and family-building benefits by American employers. In 2022, companies were increasingly offering benefits for in vitro fertilization, surrogacy, adoption and egg freezing as recruitment and employee-retention tools.

In 2025, Progyny had contracts with more than 590 employers across more than 40 industries, covering approximately 7.2 million employees and dependents. It reported revenue of $1.29 billion, net income of $58.5 million and 856 employees for that year.

== Developments ==
=== Alabama embryo ruling ===
In February 2024, the Supreme Court of Alabama ruled that the state's Wrongful Death of a Minor Act applied to embryos created through in vitro fertilization and stored outside the uterus. Several fertility clinics in Alabama subsequently paused IVF services because of concerns about potential liability.

In response, Progyny arranged travel reimbursements and paid to ship embryos to other clinics for some members affected by the service interruptions. In May 2024, the company reduced its annual revenue forecast after lower-than-expected utilization of its services. Progyny said that the decline in March coincided with uncertainty and public discussion following the Alabama ruling.

=== Loss of Amazon contract ===
Amazon began providing Progyny fertility benefits to eligible American employees in 2019. In September 2024, Amazon announced it would end its Progyny contract effective January 1, 2025, and replace the company with competing fertility-benefits provider Maven Clinic.

Progyny disclosed the loss of a major client, which was identified as Amazon by the health news website Stat. The client covered approximately 670,000 members and accounted for 13 percent of the company's 2023 revenue. For 2025, Progyny reported that no client accounted for more than 10 percent of its annual revenue.

== See also ==
- Assisted reproductive technology
- Fertility tourism
- Pharmacy benefit management
- Reproductive health
