= Wlassics =

Wlassics may refer to:

- Gyula Wlassics (1852–1937), Hungarian politician
- Tibor Wlassics (1936–1998), Hungarian scholar

== See also ==
- Vlašić
