= Prime Now =

Subsidiary of Amazon

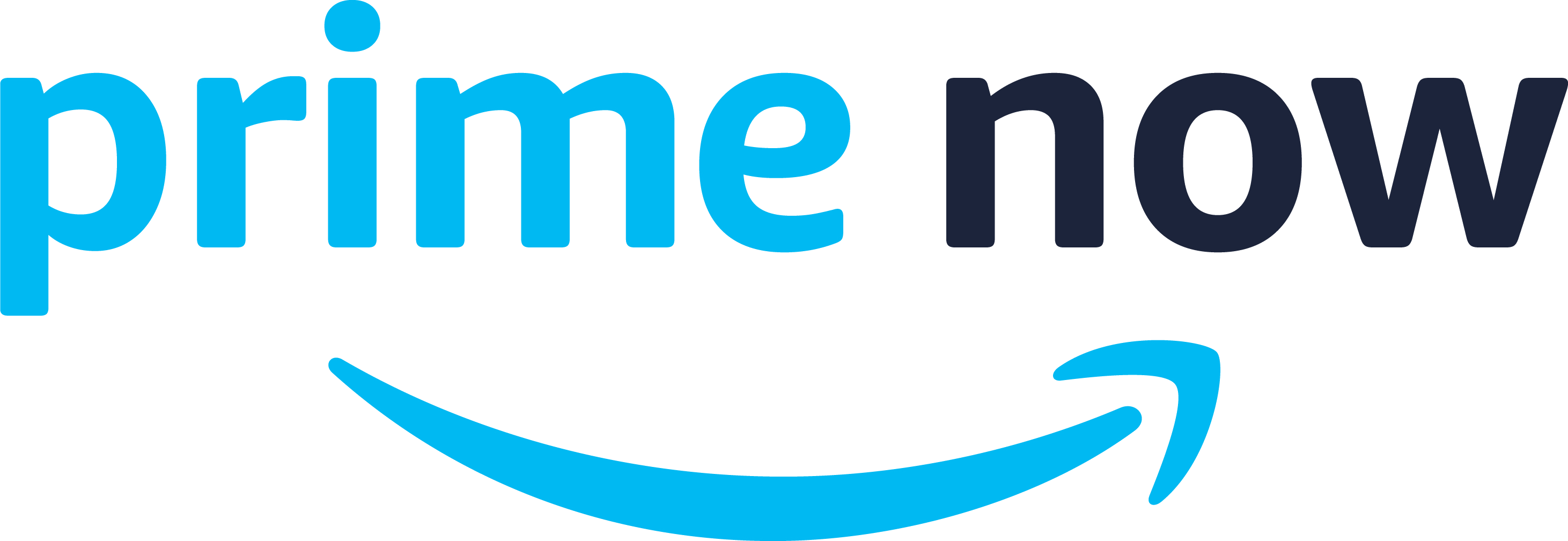

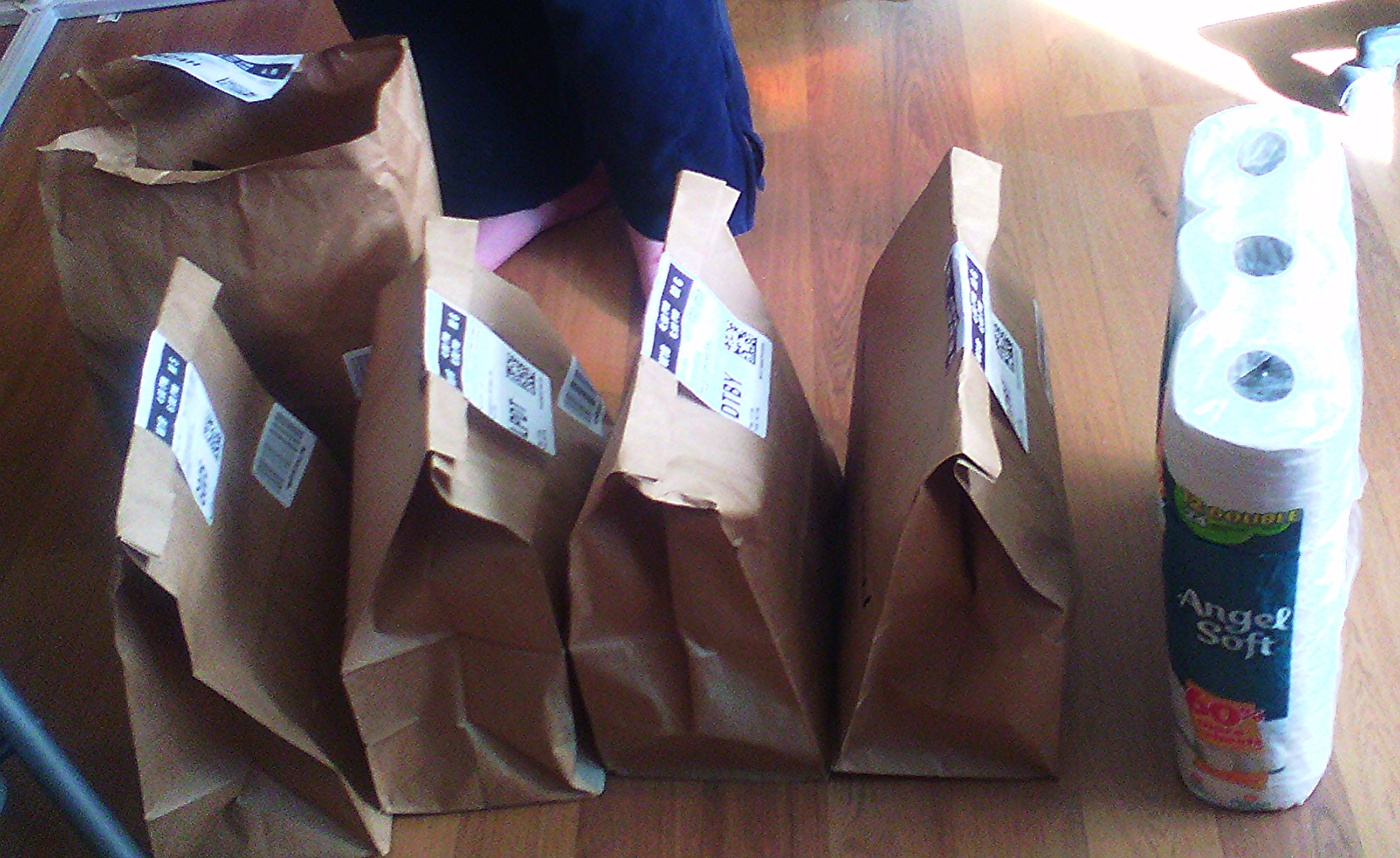
- Prime Now delivery bags
- Areas served: France, Germany, India, Italy, Japan, Spain, Singapore, United Kingdom, United States
- Website: see below

Prime Now, LLC is a subsidiary of Amazon that oversees its same-day grocery shopping and delivery service. The name also originated a brand, including a custom app, to distinguish the service from Amazon's other offerings, but both the branding and the app have since been discontinued. The service is used chiefly by the company's own Whole Foods Market and Amazon Fresh subsidiaries. An Amazon Prime subscription includes and is required for access to the service, though it may not be available in all locations where Amazon Prime is offered. Third-party retail partners may also participate in the service and sell goods through Amazon's website.

In a May 2016, survey conducted by Cowen & Co., approximately one in four Amazon Prime users had used Prime Now.

== Overview ==
Users can order groceries from local retailers to be delivered by independent contractors, similar to Instacart. Participants in the program include Whole Foods Market, Amazon Fresh, and local partners such as Uwajimaya. Sprouts Farmers Market was a former participant, ending its partnership after Amazon's acquisition of Whole Foods. To eliminate packaging waste, items are placed in paper bags for delivery and taken out of insulated bags at the time of delivery to be reused.

In February 2018, Prime Now began adding the ability to place orders from Whole Foods Market stores in the service area. As of April 2018, the service was live in 10 markets.

In addition to delivery, grocery pickup is also available in some markets.

=== Areas served ===
Prime Now is available in most major metropolitan areas of the United States and United Kingdom, and in select markets in the rest of the world.

In December 2014, Prime Now first launched in parts of New York City, by Stephenie Landry, an Amazon vice president who also heads up AmazonFresh and the now defunct Amazon Restaurants. The Prime Now service allows members to have products delivered to them within one hour for a fee of $7.99, or within two hours for no additional fee. As of 2014, 25,000 daily essential products were available through the service.

In February 2015, the service was extended to include all of Manhattan. By mid-2016, it had been expanded in the United States to include parts of Chicago, Miami, Baltimore, Seattle, Dallas, Atlanta, Austin, Nashville, Portland, San Antonio, and Tampa. It has also expanded to certain cities in the United Kingdom, including London, Birmingham, Newcastle, Manchester, and Liverpool. Other cities around the world with Prime Now include Rome, Milan, Munich, Berlin, Paris, Barcelona, Madrid, Valencia, Tokyo, Osaka, Kawasaki, Yokohama, and Singapore.

Amazon launched its 2-hour grocery delivery service, Amazon Now, in India in February 2016 in Bangalore. The service spread to Delhi, Mumbai, and Hyderabad the same year. Available only as an app on Android and iOS devices, the service was re-branded as Prime Now in May 2018. Apart from tying up with local hypermarkets and supermarkets like Big Bazaar and More, Amazon has also set up its own fulfillment centers in these cities to meet consumer demand.

=== Amazon Restaurants ===
Amazon Restaurants was an online food ordering service available in 20 metro areas throughout the United States. In January 2018, the service had 7,601 restaurants, which offered delivery through the Prime Now service. In addition to independent restaurants, the service offered delivery from chains such as Red Robin, Applebee's, Olive Garden, and P.F. Chang's. Amazon Restaurants was available on the Prime Now mobile app and on Amazon's website. One-hour delivery was free once users meet a certain spending amount, determined by the restaurant. In November 2018, Amazon announced plans to withdraw from the United Kingdom market, citing an over-saturation of the market by competitors. In June 2019, Amazon shut down the service in remaining markets. It has not withdrawn from the restaurant delivery business entirely: in May 2019 Amazon announced its investment in the UK-based restaurant delivery service Deliveroo.

== Employment ==
Amazon Flex packages loaded into an independent contractor’s personal vehicle

Most workers who shop for (or "pick") groceries are employees of Amazon or Whole Foods and remain at the facility to prepare orders. To meet the on-demand delivery needs of Prime Now, Amazon launched Amazon Flex, a platform for gig workers, in 2015. Drivers for the program use a proprietary app to complete deliveries. The contractors do not wear Amazon branded apparel, and deliver using their personal vehicles. Zur and Brown note the benefits to Amazon.com of this "flexible-capacity model".

=== Lawsuits ===
In October 2015, former Flex contractors sued Amazon as they were earning below the minimum wage while working out of Amazon facilities and wearing a badge identifying that they were with Amazon.

In October 2016, another group of Amazon Flex contractors sued the company in the federal court in Seattle, stating that they should be classified as employees due to factors such as mandatory training sessions and having to follow a route decided by Amazon.
