= Claussen pickles =

American brand of pickled cucumbers

Claussen Pickles

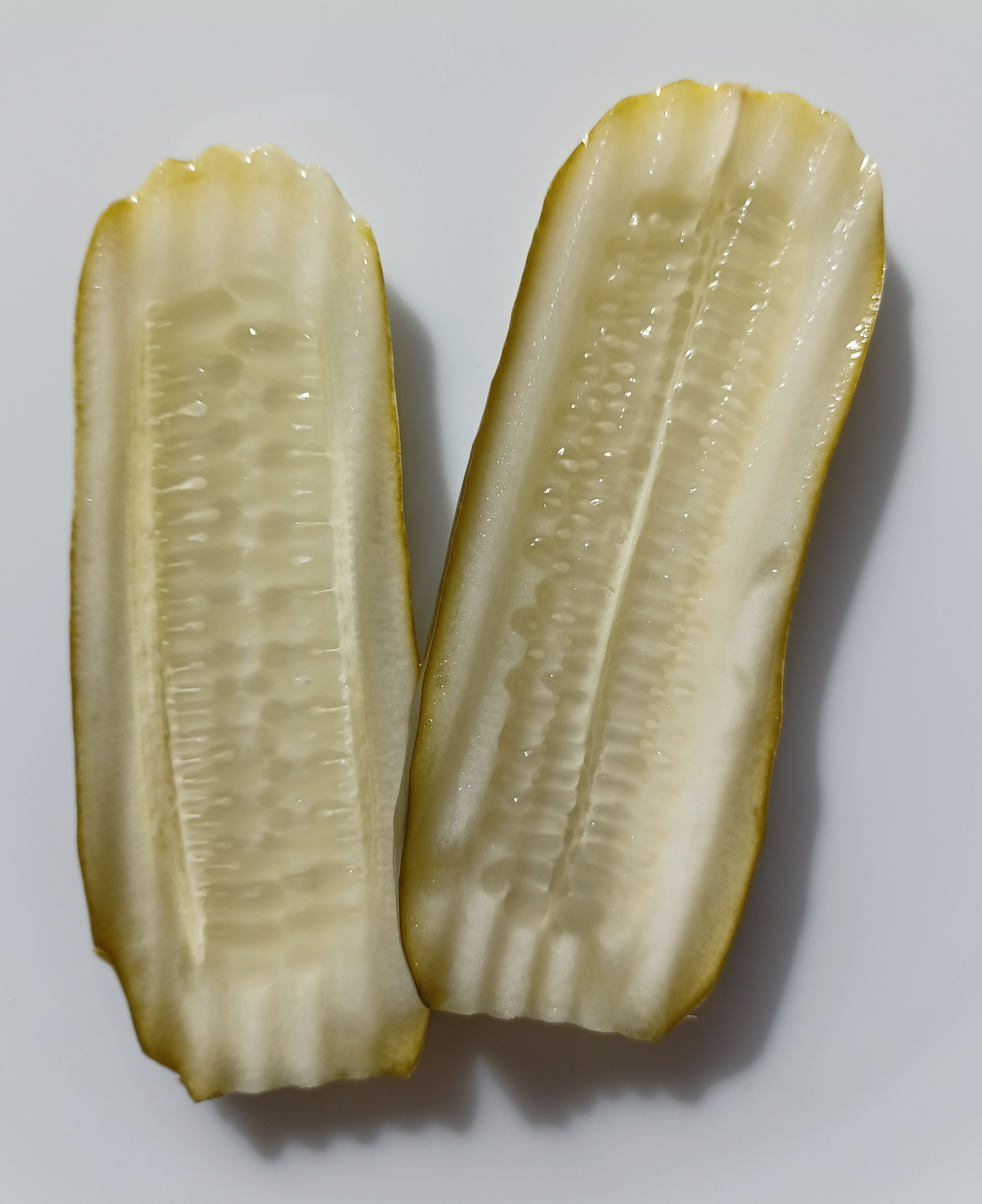
- Claussen kosher dill sandwich slices
- Product type: Pickled cucumber
- Current owner: Kraft Heinz
- Country: U.S.
- Introduced: 1870; 156 years ago
- Previous owners: C. F. Claussen & Sons
- Website: myfoodfamily.com/claussen

Claussen is an American brand of pickled cucumbers that is headquartered in Woodstock, Illinois, an exurb of Chicago. Unlike many other brands, Claussen pickles are uncooked and are typically located in the refrigerated section of grocery stores.

Claussen is advertised as having superior crunchiness to other brands. In a 1992 television advertisement, Claussen pickles were shown snapping under pressure, while unnamed rival brands merely bent without breaking. In response, Vlasic Foods Inc. submitted a complaint to an advertising industry tribunal, claiming that the commercial was unfair and misleading. Ultimately, however, the claims of Claussen were upheld by the tribunal.

== History ==
The company C. F. Claussen & Sons was founded by Claus Claussen Sr. in Chicago in May 1870. Claussen was a vegetable farmer on land that today is in the Chicago city limits at 51st and South Western Blvd. He had a surplus crop of cucumbers one year, and so he decided to pickle them. Claussen pickles were produced on the same piece of land until 1976 when the plant moved to Woodstock, Illinois.

Claus Claussen Sr. was succeeded by his son Claus S. Claussen, who was serving as president of the company when he died following an automobile accident on December 20, 1932. William C. Claussen (b. 1890) served as president of the Claussen Pickle Company as well.

The company was sold to Oscar Mayer in 1970. Oscar Mayer was later acquired by General Foods in 1981, who in turn merged with Kraft, Inc. in 1990 to form Kraft General Foods, renamed Kraft Foods in 1995. In 2015, Kraft Foods and Heinz agreed to a merger, and Kraft Foods became known as Kraft Heinz.

In 2002, the investment group that owned Vlasic Pickles sought to acquire the Claussen brand as well. The Federal Trade Commission blocked the proposed merger on the grounds that it would have severe anticompetitive effects, leading to a monopoly in the refrigerated-pickle market.

== Varieties ==
Claussen pickles come in several varieties:

- Kosher Dills (whole, halves, spears, mini dills, and sandwich slices)
- Deli Style Hearty Garlic (sandwich slices and wholes)
- New York Deli Half Sours (wholes)
- Burger Slices
- Hot & Spicy (spears & chips)

=== Other products ===
Additionally, Claussen manufactures sauerkraut and a sweet pickle relish that won the San Francisco Chronicle's June 18, 2008, Taster's Choice challenge. Claussen ceased production of its sweet pickle relish in 2021.

Claussen also partnered with Spritz Society in 2023 to release a pickle-flavored sparkling wine cocktail, and with Frankford Candy & Chocolate Company in 2024 to release Claussen Pickle-flavored jelly beans.
