= Gary Wiren =

American golf instructor (born 1935)

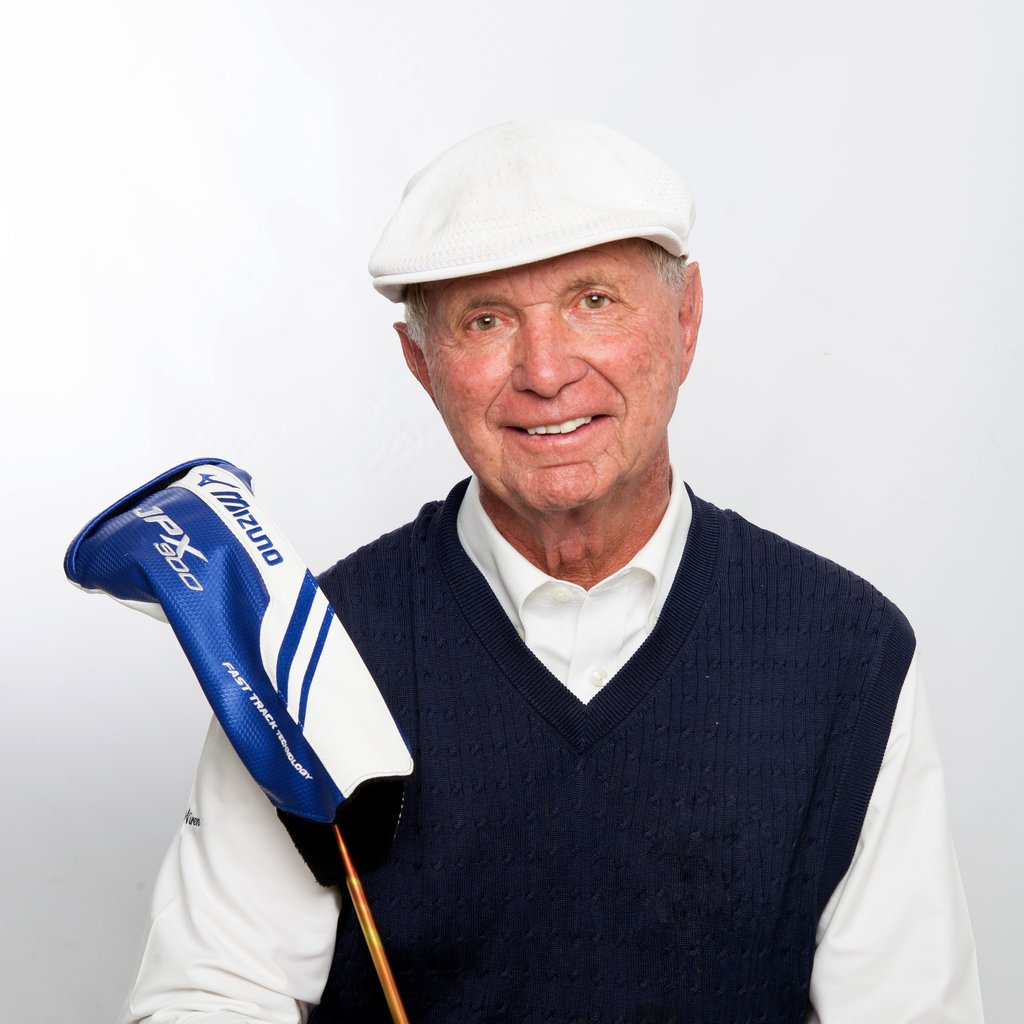
- Born: 1935 (age 90–91)
- Education: Huron University; University of Michigan; University of Oregon (PhD)
- Occupations: Golf instructor Golf writer Golfer; Business executive
- Known for: Director of Education, Learning, and Research for the PGA of America (1972–1985)
- Notable work: The PGA Teaching Manual; The PGA Manual of Golf: The Professional Way to Play Better Golf
- Title: Senior Director of Instruction for Trump Golf Properties
- Awards: Honorary doctorate from Ferris State University; World Golf Teachers' Hall of Fame; PGA Hall of Fame
- Website: www.garywiren.com

Gary Wiren (born 1935) is a PGA Master Professional instructor. Wiren was the Director of Education, Learning, and Research for the PGA of America between 1972 and 1985, during which time he produced the "Laws, Principles, and Preferences" of golf swing instruction. He is the founder of three golf schools, and is now the senior director of instruction for Trump Golf Properties. Wiren is a member of both the PGA Hall of Fame and the World Golf Teachers' Hall of Fame. As an author, he has written fourteen books, and Wiren is also the founder of Golf Around the World.

== Education and early life ==
Born in 1935, Wiren became an all-state golfer in high school while playing in Omaha, Nebraska. He then attended Huron University in South Dakota, where he played quarterback for the football team and was named an All-American. He also played golf for the college, winning the conference championship. He then received his master's degree in Sport Science from the University of Michigan, and his PhD from the University of Oregon. In 1962, during the completion of his doctorate, he began teaching golf at a local community course. He later received an honorary doctorate from Ferris State University in Michigan.

== Golf playing career ==
Wiren competed in the 1994 U.S. Senior Open, and in two additional events on the Senior PGA Tour. He has also competed in professional long-ball driving tournaments from the 1970s into the 2010s, and regional PGA championships. His titles have included the South Florida PGA Seniors title and the South Florida long-driving championship.

== Golf instruction career ==
Wiren was the chairman of the Pacific Northwest PGA in the late 1960s and early 1970s. In 1972, he relocated to Florida, becoming the Director of Education, Learning, and Research for the PGA of America, a position he held for fourteen years, leaving in 1985. He also founded The Five Star Golf School at the Boca Raton Hotel and Club, The PGA Jr. National Academy, and Golf Discovery Schools for the PGA of America. In 1976, Wiren introduced the "Laws, Principles, and Preferences" of teaching a full golf swing, as a member of a group of instructors working with the National Golf Foundation. The "laws" in the model refer to how physics affect the connection of the club face and the ball. The five factors included are clubhead path, clubface position, clubhead speed, angle of approach, and centeredness of contact.

The "principles and preferences" refer to how the individual golfer swings the club in order to strike the ball—including choices in the swing regarding physical and emotional states, as well as where the ball is intended to go. His "principles" are separated into "pre-swing principles" (the grip, aim and alignment, and setup) and "in-swing principles" (swing plane, width of arc, length of arc, position of target arm and wrist, lever system, timing, release, dynamic balance, swing center, connection, and impact). "Preferences" are developed based upon the individual golfer during instruction. Wiren added to the ball flight laws by contributing the concept of centeredness of contact.

Following his time with the PGA, Wiren continued instructing for private companies as a PGA Master Professional instructor. He also spent several years hosting a golf instruction television show in Japan, and spent seventeen years as head of the Mizuno Golf Schools in that country. He has also appeared in segments on ESPN and The Golf Channel. In the 1990s, he became the senior director of instruction for all Trump Golf Properties, operating out of Trump International in West Palm Beach, Florida.

It is estimated that he has taught more than a quarter-million students over his career, in 32 countries.

== Businesses ==
Wiren is the founder of Golf Around the World, which is a business that tests and sells golf teaching and training aids, and issues reviews and recommendations on each. He is also the developer of the "Impact Bag" golf training aid, which measures the feel of the moment of impact.

== Writing ==
Wiren is also the author of The PGA Teaching Manual and The PGA Manual of Golf: The Professional Way to Play Better GOLF. In all, he has written 14 published books. As a writer, he also wrote more than 250 articles for magazines and other periodicals.

== Recognition ==
In 1989 Wiren was named PGA Teacher of the Year. Wiren has since been inducted into the PGA Hall of Fame and the World Golf Teachers' Hall of Fame. Other Hall of Fames he has been inducted into include the halls of the Nebraska, South Dakota and Florida, and Pacific Northwest Section of the PGA. He has been voted as one of the top fifty golf instructors in the U.S. by Golf Digest. Awards he has received include the National Golf Foundation's Joe Graffis Award and Herb Graffis Award in 1978, the LPGA's Rolex Ellen Griffin Award, and distinguished service awards in Sweden, Japan, Italy, New Zealand, and the US.

Wiren is also known for his collection of golf memorabilia, which includes more than thirty-five hundred clubs and two thousand balls from the 1700s to the contemporary game. His collection has been exhibited publicly at the Cornell Museum in Delray Beach and the Lighthouse ArtCenter. His archive is a three-time national winner of the Golf Collectors' Society wooden-shafted tournament.
