= Herb Graffis =

American golf administrator

- Born: May 31, 1893; Logansport, Indiana, US
- Died: February 13, 1989 (aged 95); Fort Myers, Florida, US
- Occupations: Journalist, golf administrator

Herbert Butler Graffis (May 31, 1893 – February 13, 1989) was an American golf writer and administrator. In recognition of his efforts to promote the sport, he was elected to the World Golf Hall of Fame in 1977.

== Life and career ==
Graffis was born in Logansport, Indiana, on May 31, 1893. He wrote for the Chicago Sun-Times and founded the magazines Chicago Golfer in 1927, Golfdom in 1927, and Golfing in 1933. He collaborated with Tommy Armour on three instructional books and in 1975 he published a history of the PGA of America.

== Golf organizations ==
Graffis was also founder of a number of golf organizations: the National Golf Foundation, the Golf Writers Association of America, the Golf Course Superintendents Association, the Club Managers Association.

He published the first U.S. Open program in 1928 and held various official positions with the PGA of America and the United States Golf Association, including the presidency of National Golf Day.

== Death ==
Graffis died in Fort Myers, Florida, on February 13, 1989, aged 95.

== Awards and honors ==
In 1977, Graffis was inducted into the World Golf Hall of Fame.
