= Jacques Habra =

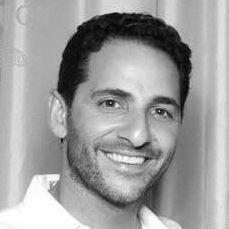
- Habra - Circa 2017
- Born: January 9, 1974 (age 52); Beirut
- Education: University of Michigan
- Height: 5 ft 8 in (173 cm)
- Spouse: Angela Habra
- Partner(s): Married November 9th, 2019
- Website: jacqueshabra.com

Jacques Habra is a Lebanese American technology entrepreneur, investor and thought leader. He is most known for founding WebElite, a web application technology agency in 1996, and creating brands and several companies that experienced successful exits, Habra is the founder and CEO of Noospheric, a startup consulting incubator based in Santa Barbara and he currently focuses on real estate development projects.

== Education and early career ==
Habra was born on January 9, 1974, in Beirut. A graduate of Hackett Catholic Central High School, Habra received his bachelor's degree with Honors in 1996 from the University of Michigan in English and Philosophy. Habra launched Web Elite during his senior year at the University of Michigan and sold the company in 2001 to a group of investors for an undisclosed sum.

== Career ==
In 1999, Habra purchased a 12,600 sq/ft commercial building (previously a movie theater) that he converted into an office space for Web Elite. During Habra's leadership of Web Elite, the company pioneered online content management systems, online analytics systems, on the fly survey results, and off-line technology.

Through WebElite, Habra created several technologies that were later adopted as mainstream Web tools including one of the first content management systems (CMS) called the Auto-Mod Form, which allowed Web owners to modify content on their Web site without directly accessing servers or knowing any code. In 1999, Habra launched Unplugged, an application that allowed the use of a Web site without being connected to the Internet.

In 2003, Jacques Habra joined Amer Zahr to co-found "OZ" - a night club in Ann Arbor with a middle eastern theme serving Hookahs. Habra currently manages the incubator and consulting firm, Noospheric, where he develops and invests in early-stage companies. Through Noospheric, Habra has invested in TrackR (formerly Phone Halo) First Click, SBClick, SelfEcho, and FreePropertyAlert. Habra founded First Click in 2007 to provide online marketing services.

Habra launched SelfEcho, a company, which develops technology to manage and improve well-being by tracking psychological metrics using smartphones; including the product Mobile Therapy, in 2013. Habra was the lead angel investor and advisor of TrackR from 2009 - 2011. In August, 2017, TrackR raised $50MM by Revolution Growth and Amazon Alexa Fund through a Series B round.

In 2017, Habra joined Grown Rogue as Chief Strategy Officer, a publicly traded cannabis company with operations in Oregon, California, and Michigan. Habra is credited for coining the branding of "The Right Experience, Every Time" for the companies' product launch in 2017 as well as helping to raise $6 Million for company expansion. Habra created the branding to differentiate the company from the traditional "stoner" image to a modern application for the use of cannabis.

Habra is an adjunct professor at Santa Barbara City College and serves on several non-profit boards including the Arthritis Foundation Leadership Council, Westmont College Foundation Board, MIT Enterprise Forum of the Central Coast, and Mentorship Works. Habra regularly speaks at technology and entrepreneurship conferences around the world.

== Awards ==
- Entrepreneur of the Year in 2016 by SBTIA
- Young Entrepreneur of the Year by Andersen Consulting in 2001
- Entrepreneur of the Year Finalist by Ernst & Young for years 1999, 2000, and 2001
