= Vlašić (surname) =

Vlašić (also spelt Vlasic) is a South Slavic surname found in Croatia, Bosnia and Serbia.

The etymology of the surname is based on the ethnonym of the Vlachs. (Note: Cf. Vlachs in the history of Croatia, Vlachs in medieval Bosnia and Herzegovina)

The Croatian anthroponymy website Acta Croatica lists the earliest mention of the surname in 1606 in Catholic Church parish records. The Croatian census of 2011 listed it as one of the most common surnames in Sveta Nedelja, Zagreb County, Žumberak, Zagreb County, Podravske Sesvete, Ston, and Župa dubrovačka.

Serbian historian Radoslav Grujić documented the surname among the Serbs as well.

Notable people with the surname include:

- Alex Vlasic (born 2001), American ice hockey player
- Blanka Vlašić (born 1983), Croatian athlete
- Franjo Vlašić (1766–1840), Croatian general and ban
- Frank Vlašić (fl. 1910s), founder of Vlasic Pickles
- Joško Vlašić (born 1956), Croatian athletics coach
- Marc-Édouard Vlasic (born 1987), Canadian ice hockey player
- Mark Vlasic (born 1963), American football player
- Nikola Vlašić (born 1997), Croatian footballer
- Perica Vlašić (1932–2004), Croatian rower
- Tomislav Vlašić (1942–2025), Croatian ex-priest

== See also ==
- Vlašić
