= Paul Saleh =

American business executive

Paul N. Saleh
- Education: University of Michigan
- Occupation: Business executive
- Years active: 1985–present
- Known for: Chief executive and chief financial leadership in global technology, media, and telecommunications companies
- Spouse: Becky
- Children: 4

Paul N. Saleh is an American business executive and the founder and chief executive officer of Agdiago LLC, an artificial intelligence–based behavioral intelligence platform focused on sports organizations. He was Chief Executive Officer of the Atos Group in 2024, following his role as Chief Financial Officer of the same group in 2023. Before that, he was President and Chief Executive Officer of Gainwell Technologies from 2020 to 2023.

Saleh has held senior executive and financial leadership roles at global technology, media, and telecommunications companies, including DXC Technology, Gannett, Sprint Nextel, and The Walt Disney Company. He also served as Acting Chief Executive Officer of Sprint Nextel during a leadership transition in 2007–2008.

== Career ==
Saleh began his career at Honeywell, where he spent twelve years in senior finance and treasury roles. He later joined The Walt Disney Company, serving as Senior Vice President and Treasurer from 1997 to 1999 and subsequently as Chief Financial Officer of Walt Disney International from 1999 to 2001.

In 2001, Saleh joined Nextel Communications as Senior Vice President and Chief Financial Officer. Following the merger of Nextel and Sprint, he continued as Executive Vice President and Chief Financial Officer of Sprint Nextel, where he led the merger between Sprint and Nextel and oversaw post-merger integration efforts, and was appointed Acting Chief Executive Officer in late 2007 during a leadership transition.

From 2010 to 2012, Saleh was Senior Vice President and Chief Financial Officer of Gannett. He later became Executive Vice President and Chief Financial Officer of Computer Sciences Corporation, where he played a central role in the merger with the Hewlett-Packard Enterprise Services business, resulting in the formation of DXC Technology. During his tenure, he also oversaw multiple divestitures and spin-offs.

=== Agdiago ===
Saleh is the founder of Agdiago LLC and assumed the role of Chief Executive Officer in 2025. The company develops artificial intelligence–based behavioral intelligence tools focused on talent evaluation, development, and decision-making in sports organizations.

== Board service ==
Saleh has served on the board of directors of Anterix, including as chair of its audit committee. He has also previously been a board member of Perspecta Inc., Citadel Broadcasting Corporation, and the American Football Coaches Foundation.

== Recognitions ==
Saleh has received industry awards for his work in corporate finance and executive leadership. He was named Public Company Chief Financial Officer of the Year three times by the Greater Washington Technology Council and was recognized as Best Chief Financial Officer in Telecom Services on several occasions. He was also named one of the 100 Most Influential People in Finance by Treasury & Risk Management.
