= Stephenie Landry =

- Occupations: Businessperson; Online retail executive
- Known for: Creating Prime Now
- Title: Vice President, Amazon Grocery

Stephenie Landry is an American business executive and vice president of Amazon. She is in charge of Amazon Prime Now and AmazonFresh, and she previously led Amazon Restaurants before the service was discontinued in 2019. She led the creation and launch of many other Amazon initiatives, such as Amazon Student, Amazon Mom, and Prime Pantry.

== Education ==
Landry earned a Women's Studies degree from Wellesley College and attended business school at the University of Michigan.

== Career ==
Landry first came to Amazon as an intern in 2003 while she was attending business school, and she became a full-time Amazon employee in 2004. She started in operations, including work on logistics, transportation, supply chain, customer service, and warehousing, and she went on to create products that heavily leveraged operations. Landry held a series of jobs of increasing responsibility and in 2013, she became a Technical Advisor to Jeff Wilke, who at the time ran Amazon's worldwide consumer business and was considered one of Amazon’s most powerful executives. In 2014, Landry went on to write a detailed memo outlining the idea for Prime Now, and the service launched 111 days later.

== Recognition ==
Wired named Landry to its "Next List 2016," as one of "25 Geniuses Who Are Creating the Future of Business." Landry was also named to the 2021 and 2022 Fast Company Queer 50 list.
