= National Golf Foundation =

American golf industry trade association

- Sport: Golf
- Founded: 1936 by Herb Graffis and Joe Graffis
- CEO: Greg Nathan
- Country: United States
- Website: www.ngf.org

The National Golf Foundation (NGF), based in Jupiter, Florida, is a not-for-profit trade association within the golf industry. Founded in 1936 by golf writer Herb Graffis and his brother Joe. The foundation works to foster growth and development of the game of golf by providing research, market insights, data, and business development for the golf industry.

As of 2007 it had 6000 member companies.

Greg Nathan is CEO, succeeding Joe Beditz in 2024.

== History ==
The organization was founded in 1936 by the golf writers and brothers, Herb and Joe Graffis.

The NGF has been delivering the Graffis Award since 1970 to highlight "outstanding contributions to the game of golf". Past winners include Ellen Jean Griffin (1970) and Gary Wiren (1978).

== Publications ==
Each year, the organization releases a Golf Industry Report, “a comprehensive state-of-the-industry review.” The Graffis Report, released yearly in January, details key data on the game's continued success by highlighting data on the business of golf and the health of the game: "golf participation, engagement, rounds-played, golf course supply and development, golf equipment sales, retail supply, and the game's reach.
