= William D. Johnson (journalist) =

American male journalists

William D. Johnson is a New York City-based journalist and labor activist who writes on union and workplace issues. Johnson is the former co-editor of Labor Notes.

Johnson started on Labor Notes staff in January 2003, after interning with the organization in the winter of 2002. Previously, he worked with The Nation magazine in New York.

He has been involved in various anti-racism and workers' rights campaigns in southeastern Michigan, including the campaign to maintain affirmative action at the University of Michigan. He covers public-sector workers, UNITE HERE, postal workers, and health care.

His writing has also appeared in the print and online versions of The Nation, Z Magazine, CounterPunch, Monthly Review, the Metro Times, and in numerous other publications.

Johnson collaborated in the writing and editing of A Troublemakers' Handbook 2.
