= Robert J. Vlasic =

American pickle executive (1926–2022)

Robert Joseph Vlasic
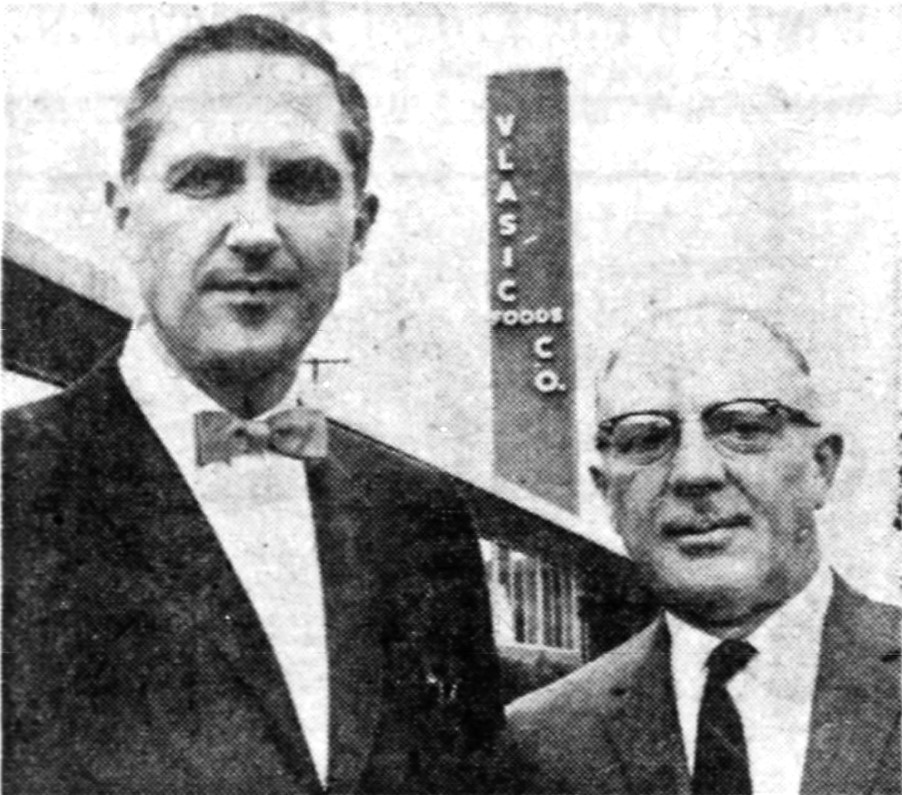
- Robert J. (left) and father Joseph Vlasic, 1963
- Born: March 9, 1926; Detroit, Michigan, U.S.
- Died: May 8, 2022 (aged 96); Bloomfield Hills, Michigan, U.S.
- Education: University of Michigan
- Occupation: Business executive
- Known for: Management of Vlasic Pickles
- Spouse: Nancy Reuter (m. 1950; died 2016)
- Children: 5

Robert Joseph Vlasic (March 9, 1926 – May 8, 2022) was an American business executive. He helped build Vlasic Pickles into one of the most popular pickle brands in the United States, controlling about a quarter of the market as of 1978.

== Early life and education ==
Vlasic was born and raised in Detroit, Michigan. His grandfather Franjo "Frank" Vlašić and his father Joseph Vlašić were Croatian Catholic immigrants who ran a dairy distribution business. Robert Vlasic served in the Navy during World War II, then attended the University of Michigan, earning a degree in industrial and mechanical engineering in 1949. In 1988, the university established the deanship of the college of engineering as an endowed position, the Robert J. Vlasic Dean of Engineering. It was the first endowed deanship in any college or school at the university.

== Career ==
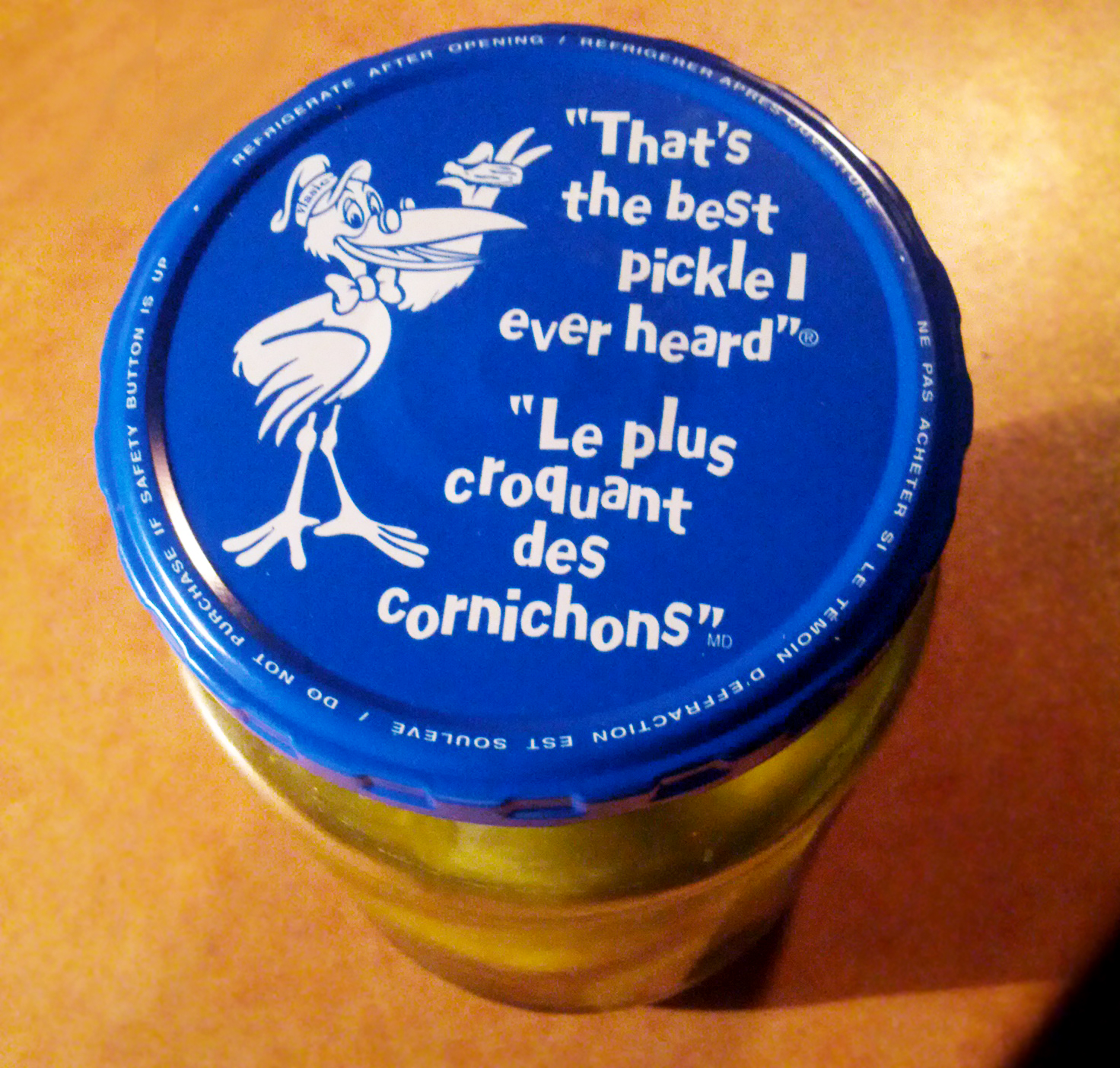
A jar of Vlasic Pickles, displaying the stork mascot introduced under Vlasic's leadership in 1974

He joined the family business after graduation, and took over its management in 1963. During the 1940s the company had expanded into fruits and vegetables, including pickles in glass jars. Vlasic got the company to move beyond distribution into production, making and selling sauerkraut and a wide variety of pickles.

He attracted public attention with light-hearted, whimsical commercials, saying that "pickles should be a fun food." Early print ads capitalized on the popular belief that pregnant women crave pickles, with a husband telling his wife "Sweetie, it’s time for your 4 o’clock pickle." The company's television ads since 1974 have featured a cartoon stork with a Groucho Marx accent, who chomps on a pickle instead of a cigar and plays up the pickle's crunch. In 1974 Vlasic published a book, Bob Vlasic's 101 Pickle Jokes.

In 1978, he sold the business to the Campbell Soup Company and took a seat on Campbell's board of directors, serving as its chairman from 1989 to 1993. He also served on multiple nonprofit and charity boards, including the chairmanship of the board of Henry Ford Hospital. A devout Catholic, he served as a financial advisor to the Archdiocese of Detroit.

== Personal life ==
In 1950, he married Nancy Reuter; they lived in Grosse Pointe Shores and later in Bloomfield Hills, where Vlasic died in 2022. The couple had five sons. Nancy died in 2016.
