= Maven Clinic =

Digital healthcare company

- Type: Private
- Industry: Information technology Health informatics
- Founder: Kate Ryder
- Headquarters: New York, New York, U.S.
- Key people: Kate Ryder, founder & CEO
- Number of employees: 500
- Website: www.mavenclinic.com

Maven Clinic is a women's digital healthcare company.

== History ==
Maven was founded in 2014. In the same year, the company raised $125 million, prompting a valuation of $1.7 billion. In April 2026, Maven was named as one of Time's 100 Most Influential Companies of 2026.

== Products and offerings ==
The platform connects women to virtual appointments with ob-gyns, fertility care providers, and other female-oriented healthcare specialists. Its service, Maven Wallet, also facilitates employer-sponsored healthcare reimbursements. The company uses Maven Intelligence, an artificial intelligence tool, to integrate its virtual clinic, care programs, and benefits services.

== Market ==
Maven is used by over 2,000 employers. Some of its competitors include Midi Health, Carrot Fertility, Kindbody, and Progyny, Inc.

== Leadership ==
The company is led by founder and Chief Executive Officer (CEO) Kate Ryder.
