= Steve Richardson (puzzle designer) =

American puzzle creator

- Education: Colby College (BA); University of Michigan (MBA)
- Occupation: Puzzle creator
- Known for: Founding Stave Puzzles

Steve Richardson is an American puzzle creator and founder of Stave Puzzles.

== Early life ==
Steve Richardson was formerly a student of math and computer science (BA Colby, MBA University of Michigan). He lived with his wife in New Jersey until 1969 when they moved to Vermont. Soon after arriving in Vermont, Richardson started a game design business with artist Dave Tibbetts.

== Stave Puzzles ==
Stave Puzzles was born in 1974 when a client offered $300 for a wooden jigsaw puzzle and Richardson and Tibbetts jumped at the opportunity. Richardson and Tibbetts combined their first names to form the name ‘Stave’. In 1976 Richardson bought out Tibbetts for $1 and a jigsaw. Richardson adopted the title ‘Chief Tormentor’ in 1978 and in the following years begin to receive national attention for his innovative puzzle designs. Clients of Richardson's designs include Bill Gates, Barbara Bush, and the Queen of the United Kingdom. "We have a sadomasochistic relationship with our customers," says Richardson.

As a puzzle innovator, Richardson is credited with inventing the "Phony Corner" (a corner that's not a corner) and the "Whammy Edge" (edge pieces that abut rather than interlock). Richardson carries on a long tradition of wood puzzle manufacturers that includes names such as Par, Straus, and Parker Brothers (as Pastime Puzzles). Richardson's puzzles never include a picture of the puzzle with the box and many puzzles contain hidden messages, custom shaped pieces, and even extra pieces that do not fit into the puzzle.

Richardson "prides himself on his company's high-quality products and attentive customer service".
