= Frank Acosta =

Mexican-American business man

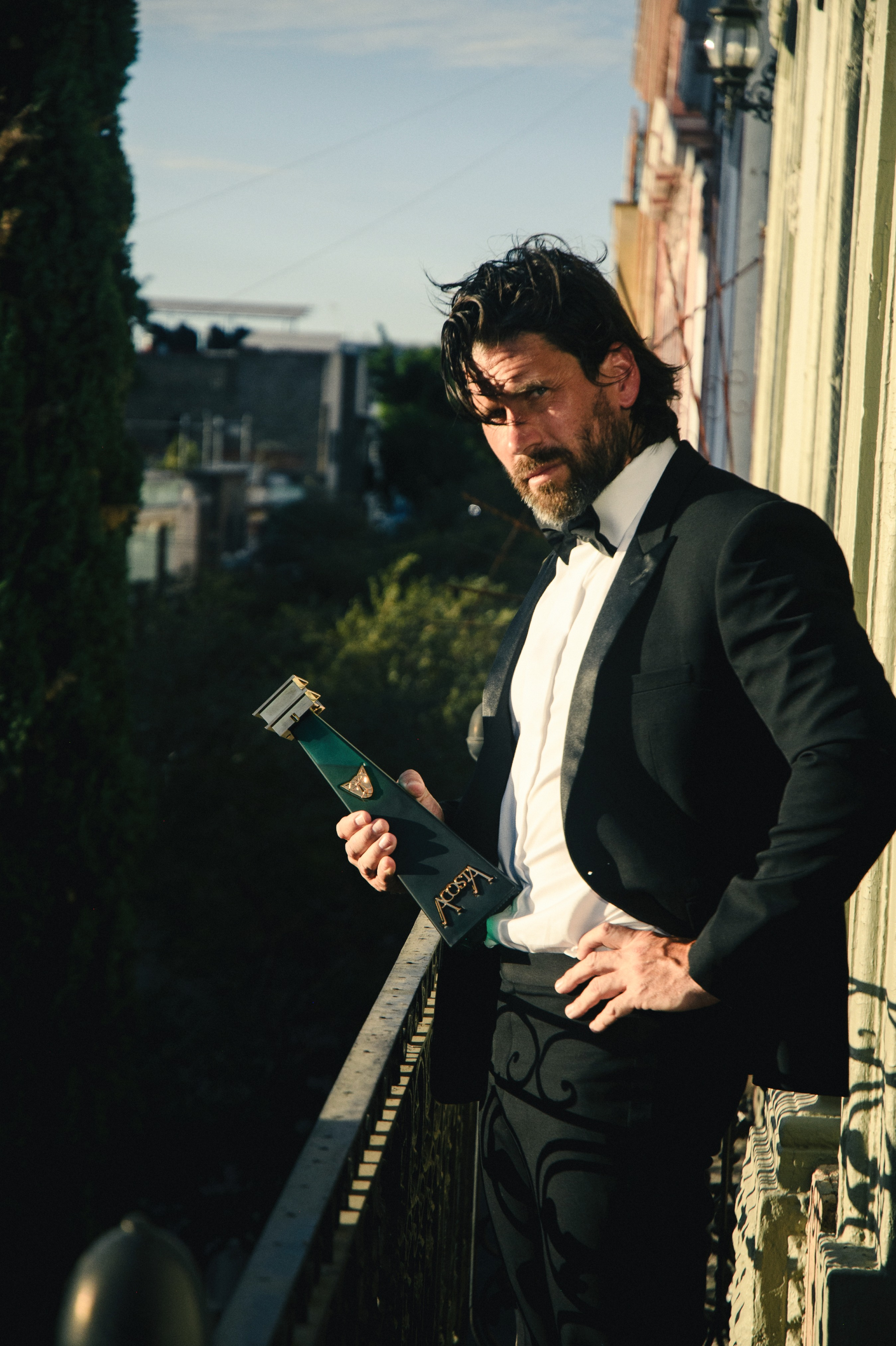
Frank Acosta

Frank Acosta is a Mexican-American businessman who co-founded Manhattan Milk in 2006, along with business partner Matt Marone. He made an appearance on The Real Housewives of Orange County

== Early life and education ==
Acosta grew up in Michigan and attended the University of Michigan as a pre-law student.

== Career ==
Acosta was a personal trainer before co-founding Manhattan Milk in 2006. In 2017, Manhattan Milk had eight trucks delivering and placing milk, eggs and other dairy, fruit and vegetable products into refrigerated boxes on the doorsteps of homes and businesses throughout Manhattan, Brooklyn, The Bronx, Long Island City and Westchester.

In 2019, Acosta founded Acosta Tequila as a tribute to his Mexican heritage.
