= Kate Ryder =

American healthcare entrepreneur and advocate

- Born: Minnesota
- Other name: Katherine Ryder
- Education: University of Michigan (Bachelor's); London School of Economics (Master's)
- Occupations: Founder and CEO of Maven Clinic

Kate Ryder is an American business person. She is the founder and CEO of the digital health company Maven Clinic.

== Early life and education ==
Kate Ryder grew up in Minnesota.She earned a bachelor's degree at the University of Michigan, majoring in both English and political science.

After graduating, Ryder moved to Spain to teach English at public schools. She later attended the London School of Economics and earned a master's degree in anthropology.

== Career ==
Ryder began her career as a business journalist, writing for The Economist, The New Yorker and The Wall Street Journal in Southeast Asia, New York and London.

In 2009, she collaborated with former U.S. Treasury Secretary Hank Paulson on his memoir, ''On the Brink''. In 2012, Ryder left journalism and joined Index Ventures, working for the company in Europe and the United States and focusing on early-stage investments.

In 2014, she founded Maven Clinic, a digital health company that focuses on the health of families and women.

Ryder has received recognition for her work in healthcare and entrepreneurship from publications including Fortune, Fast Company, and Time.

== Personal life ==
As of 2021, Ryder and her family live in Brooklyn, New York.

== See also ==
- List of University of Michigan business alumni
