= Stave Puzzles =

American jigsaw puzzle company

Stave Puzzles, Inc.
- Type: Private
- Founded: Norwich, Vermont, USA (1974)
- Founder: Steve Richardson, Dave Tibbetts
- Headquarters: Norwich, Vermont
- Area served: Worldwide
- Products: Jigsaw puzzles
- Owner: Steve Richardson
- Number of employees: 25 (2015)
- Website: http://www.stavepuzzles.com

Stave Puzzles is an American jigsaw puzzle company located in Norwich, Vermont. The company was started in 1974 by Steve Richardson and Dave Tibbetts and was called Stave—a portmanteau of their first names. They manufacture hand cut jigsaw puzzles made from cherry-backed, 5-layered, 1/4-inch (6.4 mm) wood. Stave produces several different puzzles types ranging from traditional puzzles, teaser puzzles which can have many open areas within the puzzles, trick puzzles in which the puzzles can be put together in two or more ways of which only one is correct. They also create three-dimensional puzzles, limited edition puzzles, and complete custom puzzles. Each puzzle is provided in a green and blue box and does not include a picture of the completed puzzle. Stave Puzzles is the largest hand-cut jigsaw puzzle company in the United States and competes with laser-cutting companies like Liberty Puzzles and Artifact Puzzles.

== Company history ==
Steve Richardson moved from New Jersey to Vermont in 1969 and started a game design business with Dave Tibbetts. In 1974, Richardson was offered US$300 to make a wooden jigsaw puzzle. Richardson and Tibbetts founded Stave Puzzles in the same year. In 1976, Richardson bought out Tibbetts' share of the company for US$1 and a jigsaw. He built a small shop behind his garage and hired his first employee.

In 1983, Stave introduced their first 2-Way Trick Puzzle, called Go Fish. In 1989, Stave Puzzles released an April Fools' Day joke puzzle called 5 Easy Pieces, which had no solution. The puzzle's first thirty buyers were refunded their purchase price. Owners of Stave Puzzles include Queen Elizabeth II, Barbara Bush, Stephen King, Julie Andrews, Tom Peters, and Bill Gates. In 1990, Stave Puzzles was listed in the Guinness Book of World Records as having the most expensive jigsaw puzzle. Stave Puzzles was named by Tom Peters as the 1991 Product of the Year.

== Products ==
=== Traditional puzzles ===
Stave produces traditional rectangular puzzles that range in size from 5 by 7 inches (13 cm × 18 cm) (75 pieces) to 20 by 25 inches (51 cm × 64 cm) (1000 pieces). For every hundred pieces, five custom pieces (such as dates, names, or silhouettes) can be cut into the puzzle.

=== Teaser puzzles ===
Stave's Teaser puzzles are designed in such a way as to make assembly of the jigsaw puzzle harder than in a traditional jigsaw creation. Stave commissions original artwork for these puzzles. Illustrators and Stave craftspeople work together on the design to reduce the number of visual cues that would normally make it easy to put together a traditional puzzle.

A typical Teaser design has some areas that are similar to traditional puzzles, making it easier to assemble some of the puzzle. However, in the center of the puzzle, or in other separate areas, holes are left into which many pieces have to fit. These pieces may be silhouettes of shapes that are representative of objects, people, animals, etc. It's not apparent how they fit together in the holes of the puzzle until they are played with and studied. The difficult rating system for Teasers is measured on a scale of one to four swords, with four swords being the most difficult.

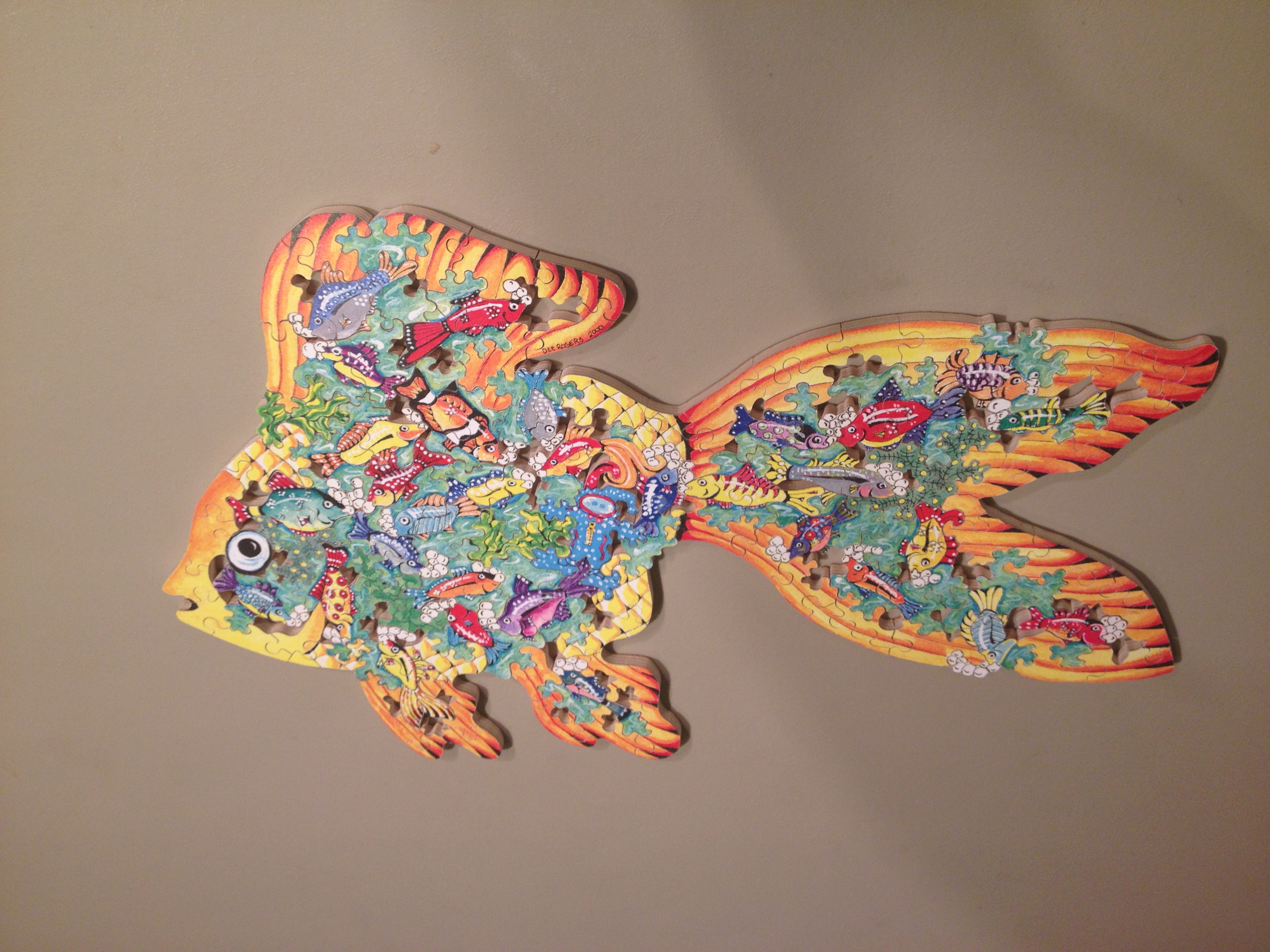
Stave Teaser Puzzle, Bubbles, Four Sword difficulty, 120 pieces, Artist: Dee Rogers

=== Trick puzzles ===
Steve Richardson earned the name Chief Tormentor for inventing the Trick puzzle, a puzzle genre in which some pieces fit in two or more different places, but only one of the solutions is considered correct. The object of a Trick puzzle is detailed on a small block of wood that accompanies Trick puzzles.

An example of a Stave Trick puzzle is Champ, which is made up of 44 blue pieces and fits together 32 different ways, only one of which is correct where the serpent eats its own tail. The difficulty rating system for Trick puzzles is measured on a scale of one to five lightning bolts, with five being the most difficult.

=== Limited-Edition puzzles ===
Stave Limited Edition puzzles are produced from custom-commissioned artwork and sold in a limited quantity. A typical limited edition has included only 50 units, although some runs have included as many as 100 units. The four main types of limited edition puzzles include: Double Deckers; Riddle; Mystery Story; and Trick. Some of the limited edition puzzles are hand painted (as opposed to a print affixed to the wood).

In general, the limited editions also include items that fit the theme and help guide the player through the puzzle and additional games. For example, the Limited Edition Trick Puzzle Time Traveler comes with several hand crafted booklets to link the puzzle to the time-travel theme underlying the puzzle. The theme of the puzzle is major events (cultural, historical, scientific discoveries, etc.) from 1000 CE to 2000 CE. The booklets guide you through untangling a set of chronological mishaps caused by an evildoer.

Trick: The limited edition trick puzzles are similar in general challenge types to the other trick puzzles sold by Stave. The main difference is greater theming and integration. Taking Time Traveler as an example, the entire puzzle has a theme, and solving the tricks and re-arranging the pieces is linked to a story and learning about history. Other puzzles such as Knight at Stavely Castle include 3D pop-ups such as an entire castle façade that goes together multiple ways and a 3D sword that you need to remove from a stone. These trick puzzles are thus more intense than the generally available trick puzzles because of the themed linking between the puzzle and accompanying materials. Olivia the octopus has 10,000 possible solutions.

=== Custom puzzles ===
Sample Custom Puzzle made from a Picture of a Puzzler's Cat Justin.

Custom puzzles are full custom work designed in conjunction with the crafters at Stave.

== Samples of unique features ==
Phony Corner

Whammy Edge

Enlarged Silhouette

Interacting Silhouette

Rebus

List of Limited Editions

Some of the Limited Editions which have been released by Stave include:

Name	Type	Artists	First Sold	Status	Comments
At the End of His Rope	Mystery	Andrea Farnham (art); Suzanne Stofflet (mystery)	1996	50/50	
Cinderella	Double Decker	Jennifer Brown	1992	23/50	This puzzle also includes a simple trick.
Densel the Dragon	Trick	Steve Richardson (tricks); Candy Thun (tricks and art)	1990	35/35	
Dickens of a Christmas	Riddle	Molly Delaney (art); Suzanne Stofflet (riddles)	1997	20/50	
Dollhouse Village	Handpainted	Jim Schubert (art)	1979	100/100	This puzzle is actually composed of five smaller puzzles that are now sold only as a set. There was a period where individual components could be purchased separately.
Hexed	Mystery	Andrea Farnham (art); Suzanne Stofflet (mystery)	1998	50/50	
HMS Pinafore	Trick	Steve Richardson (tricks and teasers); Suzanne Stofflet (word games); Molly Delany (art)	2000	7/50	
Knight at Stavely Castle	Trick	Steve Richardson (trick); Candy Thun (art)	1994	20/50	
Mad Tea Party	Riddle	Jennifer Brown (art); Suzanne Stofflet (riddles)	1997	25/50	
Midsummer Night's Dream	Double Decker	Henri Loustau	1981	77/100	
Nutcracker Suite	Double Decker	Jennifer Brown	1991	28/50	
Off with Her Head	Riddle	Jennifer Brown (art) ? (riddles)	1998	20/50	
Pentagon	Mystery	Andrea Farnham (art); Suzanne Stofflet (mystery)	1996	50/50	
Peter Pan & the Irate Pirate	Riddle	Molly Delaney (art); Suzanne Stofflet (riddles)	1997	26/50	
Pharaoh's Curse	Trick	Andrea Farnham (art and tricks)	1993	50/50	
Romeo and Juliet	Double Decker	Jennifer Brown	1999	12/50	
Snow White	Double Decker	Jennifer Brown	1993	19/50	This puzzle also includes a simple trick.
Stavely Manor	Trick	Steve Richardson (trick); Candy Thun (art)	1993	34/50	
Time Traveler	Trick	Andrea Farnham (art and tricks)	1999	50/50	
Treasure Island	Trick	Andrea Farnham (art and tricks)	1991	50/50	
Twain Foolery	Riddle	Molly Delaney (art); Suzanne Stofflet (riddles)	1999	16/50	
Under the Big Top	Trick	Andrea Farnham (art and tricks)	1992	22/50	
Wizard of Oz	Riddle	Molly Delaney (art); Suzanne Stofflet (riddles)	1998	27/50	
