= Stephen Swad =

American businessman

Stephen M. Swad is currently the President and COO of Apptopia Inc., mobile app market intelligence and alternative data company. Previously, he held the role of the former president and CEO of Rosetta Stone, having resigned effective April 1, 2015. He was Fannie Mae's Executive Vice President and Chief Financial Officer, since replaced by David Hisey. Swad was responsible for ensuring the accuracy, integrity, and timeliness of the financial reporting and accounting.

In May 2007, Swad served as Executive Vice President and Chief Financial Officer for AOL where he was the financial adviser to divisional presidents.

From 1998 through 2002, Swad served in various corporate finance roles with Time Warner. Before 1998, Swad was a partner in KPMG's national office. He also was the deputy chief accountant at the U.S. Securities and Exchange Commission. Before that, he was a senior manager at KPMG, in Detroit, Michigan.

Swad has a bachelor of business administration from the University of Michigan. He is a certified public accountant.
