= Vlasic Pickles =

Company specializing in pickled products

- Founded: 1942
- Founder: Frank Vlasic
- Headquarters: Parsippany, New Jersey (Produced in Imlay City, Michigan), United States
- Products: Pickled cucumbers: Relish
- Owner: Conagra Brands
- Website: vlasic.com

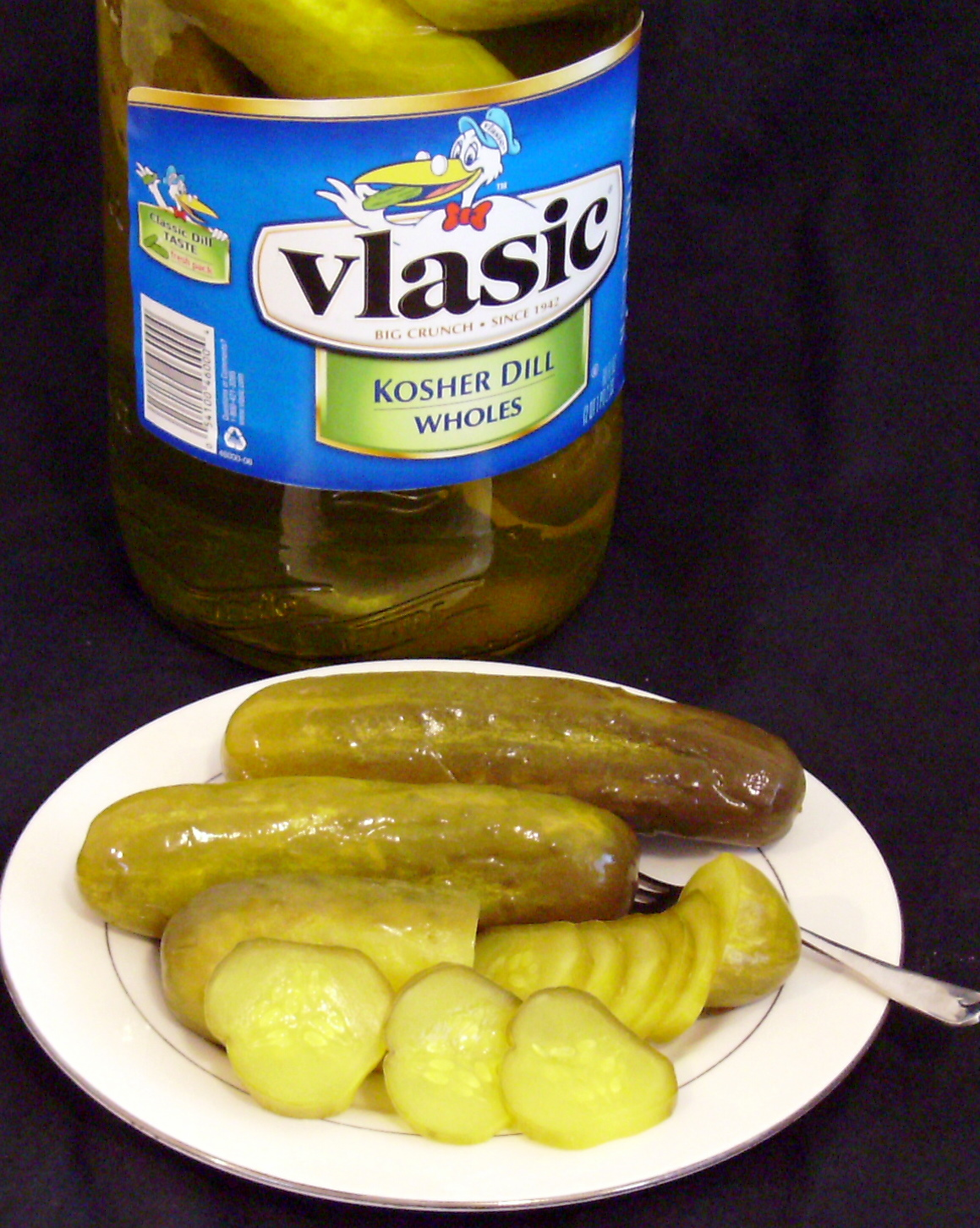
Vlasic Pickles

Vlasic is an American brand of pickles that is currently owned by Conagra Brands. Since its introduction in 1942, it has become one of the most popular pickle brands in the United States.

== History ==
Franjo "Frank" Vlašić, a Bosnian Croat emigrated from Livno, Bosnia and Herzegovina, at the time a condominium of the Austro-Hungarian Empire, to Detroit, Michigan, in 1912 and started a small creamery with savings from his factory job. His son Joseph acquired a milk route in 1922, which eventually grew into the state's largest dairy distributor. In 1937, Vlasic was approached to distribute a home-style pickle, later marketing their fresh-packed pickle in glass jars. Its first plant was built in Imlay City, Michigan. The business rapidly expanded in the post-war years, corresponding with growth in per capita pickle consumption.

A child-bearing stork was introduced as a mascot in 1974, merging the stork baby mythology with the notion that pregnant women have an above average appetite for pickles. Vlasic marketed themselves as "the pickle pregnant women crave...after all, who's a better pickle expert?" The modern Vlasic Stork speaks in a style reminiscent of Groucho Marx and holds a pickle like a cigar. The original voice was Ron Masak, since replaced by Doug Preis.

Vlasic Pickles was sold to Campbell Soup Company in 1978. It was spun off to Vlasic Foods International on March 30, 1998.

On April 13, 1999, the company introduced the Vlasic Hamburger Stackers, made from naturally grown but specially cultivated cucumbers sixteen inches (41 cm) long and over three inches (7.6 cm) in diameter, which enabled a single pickle chip to cover an entire hamburger.

In early 2001, the company voluntarily filed for Chapter 11 bankruptcy and its pickle and barbecue sauce units were initially planned to be sold to H. J. Heinz. By April of 2001, the company had backed out of the deal and was looking into other offers.

Vlasic is owned by Pinnacle Foods, a subsidiary of Conagra Brands, since its name change in 2001. In 2002, the Federal Trade Commission blocked a proposed merger between Vlasic and Claussen pickles on the grounds that it would have anticompetitive effects.

The Vlasic Stork was shown in "Icons", a MasterCard commercial during Super Bowl XXXIX in 2005 where he and many other famous advertising icons from food and cleaning equipment are shown having dinner together.

On April 10, 2019, at the Conagra Brands Investor Day event, Tom McGough, Conagra Co-Chief Operating Officer, announced that Vlasic Pickle Chips, made from vacuum-fried pickles, were in development.

The cucumbers used in Vlasic pickles are grown in Michigan, including the cities of Mount Pleasant and Kalamazoo, and processed at its plant in Imlay City, Michigan.

== See also ==
- List of brand name condiments
- Robert J. Vlasic
