= List of California companies =

This list of California companies includes notable companies that are, or once were, headquartered in California.

== Companies based in California ==
=== 0–9 ===
- 8minutenergy Renewables

=== A ===
- Aaron Sims Company
- Abgent
- Acadia Pharmaceuticals
- Accelrys
- Access Books
- ACT Biotech Inc
- Activision
- Actuate Corporation
- AdGreetz
- Adobe Inc.
- Advanced Micro Devices
- AECOM
- Aerojet Rocketdyne Holdings
- AeroVironment
- Agilent Technologies
- Airpush
- Aldila
- AleSmith Brewing Company
- Alphabet Inc.
- Altegris
- American Apparel
- American Honda Motor Company
- American River Bank
- Amgen
- Amy's Kitchen
- Anaheim Ducks Hockey Club, LLC
- Aniplex of America
- Answer Underground
- Antec
- Apple Inc.
- Applied Materials
- Applied Micro Circuits Corporation
- ArangoDB Inc.
- Arkeia Software
- Aspen Education Group
- AstraQom
- Autodesk
- Avery Dennison
- Avive

=== B ===
- Baker's Drive-Thru
- Ballast Point Brewing Company
- Banana Republic
- Bank of America Home Loans
- Bank of the West
- BatchMaster Software
- BAX Global
- bebe stores
- Beckman Coulter
- BEHR
- Belkin
- Big 5 Sporting Goods
- Bikram Yoga
- BioMarin Pharmaceutical
- Birdhouse Skateboards
- Birdwell
- BizLink Holding
- Black Angus Steakhouse
- Blizzard Entertainment
- Blue Shield of California
- BlueJeans Network
- Bolthouse Farms
- Boost Mobile
- Bristol Farms
- Broadcom Inc.
- Brown Safe Manufacturing

=== C ===
- Calico
- California Pizza Kitchen
- Callaway Golf Company
- CamelBak
- Cannabis Science
- CapitalG
- Carbon Lighthouse
- Carbon Sciences
- CareFusion
- CASA 0101
- Cathay Bank
- CBRE Group
- Century Theatres
- Charles Schwab Corporation
- Charlotte Russe
- The Cheesecake Factory
- Chevron Corporation
- Chicken of the Sea
- Circa
- Cisco Systems
- City National Bank
- The Climate Corporation
- Clorox
- Cloudera
- Cloudflare
- CNET
- The Conco Companies
- The Coffee Bean & Tea Leaf
- Corsair
- Cost Plus World Market
- Cramer's Bakery
- Cubic Corporation

=== D ===
- DataStax
- DC Entertainment
- DC Shoes
- Deckers Outdoor Corporation
- Del Monte Foods
- Del Taco
- Delta Scientific Corporation
- Deluxe Distribution
- Deluxe Media
- Diedrich Coffee
- DirecTV
- Disney
- Dodge & Cox
- Dole Food Company
- Drago restaurants
- DreamHost
- Driscoll's
- Ducommun
- Dwell
- Dwindle Distribution

=== E ===
- East West Bank
- eBay
- Edison International, owns Southern California Edison
- El Pollo Loco
- Elanex
- Electra Bicycle Company
- Electronic Arts
- Esurance
- EVGA Corporation
- Experian
- Extreme Pizza

=== F ===
- Facebook
- Facedown Records
- Factory 2-U
- Fallen Footwear
- Famous Stars and Straps
- Farmers Insurance Group
- Fatburger
- FinalCode
- First American Corporation
- First Republic Bank
- Fisker Inc.
- Fisher Investments
- Fitbit
- Fleming's Prime Steakhouse & Wine Bar
- Flip Skateboards
- Flipora
- Food 4 Less
- Forever 21
- Fosters Freeze
- Four Twenty Bank
- Fox Broadcasting Company
- Fox Racing
- Franklin Templeton Investments
- Fwix

=== G ===
- Gap Inc.
- Gateway, Inc.
- Genentech
- General Atomics
- Genesys
- Geni.com
- Ghirardelli Chocolate Company
- Gilead Sciences
- Girl Distribution Company
- Golden State Warriors, LLC
- Google LLC
- GoPro
- Gram Power
- Granite Construction
- Green Flash Brewing Company
- GreenScreen Animals
- Grimmway Farms
- Grocery Outlet
- Guess
- Guitar Center
- Guittard Chocolate Company

=== H ===
- The Hat
- Health Net
- Herbalife Nutrition
- Holden Outerwear
- Hortonworks
- Hot Dog on a Stick
- Hot Topic
- HP
- Hurley International
- Hyundai Motor America

=== I ===
- IHOP
- In-N-Out Burger
- Independent Truck Company
- Industrial Light & Magic
- Ingram Micro
- Insider Pages
- Intel
- IntelliCorp
- Intuit
- Iron Grip Barbell Company

=== J ===
- J.D. Power
- Jack in the Box
- Jacuzzi
- Jazzercise
- JBL
- Jelly Belly
- Jenny Craig, Inc.
- Jimboy's Tacos
- Johnny Rockets
- Jos. A. Bank
- JRK Property Holdings
- Juicy Juice
- Juniper Networks

=== K ===
- K-Swiss
- Kaiser Permanente
- Karman Holdings
- Karl Strauss Brewing Company
- Kashi
- KB Home
- Keenan & Associates
- Kikkoman
- Kingston Technology
- KLA-Tencor
- Klasky Csupo
- Kleiner Perkins
- Kyocera Communications, Inc.

=== L ===
- LA Fitness
- Lakai Limited Footwear
- Lakeside Herbal Solutions
- Lam Research
- Landmark Worldwide
- Lazy Acres Market
- Leap Wireless
- Levi Strauss & Co.
- Linksys
- Lionsgate
- Live Nation Entertainment
- Logitech
- Los Angeles Clippers Inc.
- Los Angeles Kings, LLC
- Los Angeles Lakers Inc.
- LRAD Corporation
- Lucas Oil
- LucasArts
- Lucasfilm
- Lucid Motors
- Lucky Brand Jeans
- Lucky Stores

=== M ===
- Macerich
- Mag Instrument, Inc.
- Mapbox
- Mattel
- Maxim Integrated
- Maxtor
- Maxwell Technologies
- Mazda North American Operations
- McAfee
- The McClatchy Company
- McKesson Corporation
- Mel Bernie Company
- Mendocino Redwood Company
- Mercury General
- Meta Platforms
- Metro-Goldwyn-Mayer
- Metropolis Technologies
- Microtek
- MindTouch
- Minor thread
- Mitsubishi Motors North America, Inc.
- Monster Energy
- Mozilla Corporation
- Music World Corporation

=== N ===
- Naked Juice
- National Steel and Shipbuilding Company
- Neogov
- Nest Labs
- Nestlé USA - Beverages Division
- NetApp
- Netflix, Inc.
- Netgear
- NetZero
- Neurocrine Biosciences
- Newegg
- Newlight Technologies
- NHS, Inc.
- Niman Ranch
- Nintendo
- NOZA, Inc.
- Nugget Markets
- Nvidia

=== O ===
- Oakley, Inc.
- Ocean Pacific
- OCZ
- Old Navy
- OneRoof Energy
- OpenAI
- OneWest Bank
- O'Reilly Media
- Original Tommy's
- Osiris Shoes

=== P ===
- Pacific Gas and Electric Company
- Pacific Lumber Company
- PacSun
- Panavision
- Panda Express
- Panda Inn
- PANTA
- Paramount Petroleum
- Paramount Pictures
- Parsons Corporation
- Party America
- Pat & Oscar's
- Patterson & Francis Aviation Company
- Pavilions
- Paxton Automotive
- PayPal
- PC World
- PCRUSH
- Peet's Coffee
- Pelican Products
- PeoplePC
- Permanente Quarry
- Petco
- Piggybackr
- Pinnacle Systems
- Pinterest
- Pixar
- Plan B Skateboards
- PMI Group
- Powell Peralta
- PowerColor
- Premiere Networks
- Princess Cruises
- Public Storage

=== Q ===
- Qualcomm
- Quantum Corporation
- Quest Software
- Quiksilver

=== R ===
- Rakuten.com
- Raley's Supermarkets
- Ralphs
- Rambus
- Rasta Taco
- Real Mex Restaurants
- Red Digital Cinema
- Reliance Steel & Aluminum Co.
- Rentech
- Rescue One Financial
- Restoration Hardware
- RingCentral
- Riot Games
- Rivian
- Robinson Helicopter Company
- Roblox
- Rockstar San Diego
- Ross Stores
- Round Table Pizza
- Rubio's Coastal Grill

=== S ===
- Safeway Inc.
- Saitek
- Saleen
- Salem Media Group
- Samsung Activewear
- Samsung Semiconductor
- San Jose Sharks, LLC
- SanDisk
- Sanmina Corporation
- SAP Ariba
- Save Mart Supermarkets
- Scaled Composites
- Scharffen Berger Chocolate Maker
- Scion
- ScyllaDB
- SD Entertainment & Kidtoon Films
- Seagate Technology
- See's Candies
- Sempra Energy
- Sendio
- Sephora (North American headquarters)
- Sequenom
- ServiceNow
- Shakey's Pizza
- Shea Homes
- Shubb
- Skechers
- Solar Turbines
- Sole Technology
- Sony Pictures Entertainment
- Souplantation
- SpaceDev
- The Spaceship Company
- SpaceX
- SpeakerCraft
- SSL
- Stater Bros.
- Stone Brewing Co.
- Sun-Maid
- Sunsweet Growers
- SureFire
- Surf Diva
- Sutter Health
- Symantec
- Synaptics
- SysIQ, Inc.

=== T ===
- Taco Bell
- Tapatio Foods
- Tastee-Freez
- Taylor Guitars
- TaylorMade
- Technicolor USA
- Teledyne Technologies
- Thrasher
- Ticketmaster
- Togo's
- Toshiba America Consumer Products (TACP) Inc., Toshiba America Information Systems Inc., Toshiba America Medical Systems Inc., and Toshiba America Mri Inc.
- Trader Joe's
- Transworld Skateboarding
- True Religion
- TYR Sport, Inc.

=== U ===
- Undrest
- Universal Pictures
- Upper Deck Company
- UTStarcom

=== V ===
- Vans
- Varian Medical Systems
- Veritas Technologies
- Viasat, Inc.
- ViewSonic
- Virgin Galactic
- Visa Inc.
- Vivid Entertainment
- Viz Media
- VMware
- Volcom
- Vons
- Vuori

=== W ===
- Warner Bros.
- Waymo
- WD-40 Company
- WebAssist
- Wells Fargo
- West Air
- Western Digital
- Western Mutual Insurance Group
- Wetzel's Pretzels
- Wienerschnitzel
- Williams-Sonoma, Inc.
- Winchell's Donuts
- Wolfgang Puck Worldwide Inc.

=== X ===
- X Development
- Xilinx
- Xirrus

=== Y ===
- Yahoo!
- Yelp
- You Bar
- YouTube
- Yum-Yum Donuts

=== Z ===
- Zero Skateboards
- Zoom

== Companies formerly based in California ==
=== A ===
- Adaptec
- Adio
- Aerojet
- AirCal
- Allergan
- Ameriflight
- Ameriquest Mortgage
- Andronico's
- Application Networks
- Averatec

=== B ===
- Baja Fresh
- Bank of California
- Bechtel
- Black Box Distribution
- BMW of North America
- Boeing Phantom Works
- Brio Technology
- Bubba Gump Shrimp Company
- Building Materials Holding Corporation

=== C ===
- California Lawyer
- Calpine
- Carvin Corporation
- Caterpillar Inc.
- Champion
- Chiron Corporation
- Circle K
- CKE Restaurants, parent of Carl's Jr., Hardee's, Green Burrito, and Red Burrito
- Coco's Bakery
- Computer Sciences Corporation
- Con-way
- Conexant
- ConSentry Networks
- Costco
- Covad
- Cricket Wireless
- Crowley Maritime
- Cunard Line

=== D ===
- Decillionix
- DIC Entertainment

=== E ===
- E-Loan
- Elephant Bar
- Emerson Network Power
- Euphonix

=== F ===
- Fairchild Semiconductor
- Fleetwood Enterprises
- Frederick's of Hollywood
- Fresh Choice

=== G ===
- Genencor
- Golden West Financial
- Good Earth Tea
- Gottschalks
- Gulf Oil
- Gymboree

=== H ===
- Häagen-Dazs
- Harris Company
- Hilton Hotels & Resorts

=== I ===
- International Lease Finance Corporation

=== J ===
- Jacobs Engineering Group
- Jamba Juice

=== K ===
- K2 Sports
- Kerio Technologies

=== L ===
- Longs Drugs
- Los Angeles Airways
- Lovecraft Biofuels
- LPL Financial
- LSI Corporation

=== M ===
- Mad Catz
- Malibu Boats
- Matson, Inc.
- Maxtor
- Maxygen
- Memorex
- Mervyn's
- Metropolitan West Financial
- MicroPower Technologies
- Microsoft
- Miro Technologies

=== N ===
- National Semiconductor
- Nationwide Asset Services
- Navigenics
- NBCUniversal
- Northrop Grumman
- Novellus Systems
- NUMMI

=== O ===
- Occidental Petroleum

=== P ===
- Pacer International
- Pacific Southwest Airlines
- Palm, Inc.
- Polar Air Cargo

=== R ===
- Riverdeep
- Rosewill
- Ruggable
- Ryan Aeronautical

=== S ===
- SAIC
- Sequoia Voting Systems
- The Sharper Image
- Silicon Graphics
- SIPphone
- Sirna Therapeutics
- The Sleep Train
- Solectron
- Spansion
- Submarina
- Sun Microsystems
- SwoopThat.com
- SYSTAT

=== T ===
- Tesla, Inc.

=== U ===
- Unified Grocers
- URS Corporation

=== V ===
- Vans
- Verisign
- Vigor Gaming
- Virgin America

=== W ===
- Waste Connections
- Watson Pharmaceuticals
- West Coast Choppers

=== X ===
- XCOR Aerospace

== See also ==
- List of companies based in the San Francisco Bay Area, with further subsets by city
