= Nationwide =

Nationwide may refer to:

== Organisations ==
- Nationwide Airlines (disambiguation), several airlines
- Nationwide Asset Services, a debt settlement company in the US
- Nationwide Building Society, a UK co-operative financial institution
- Nationwide Mutual Insurance Company, an insurance company based in Columbus, Ohio, US

== Sport ==
- Nationwide Series, or Nationwide formerly the Busch Series and now Xfinity Series, was an auto race series sponsored by the Nationwide Mutual Insurance Company
- Nationwide Championship, (1991–2000), a golf tournament in Georgia, US
- Nationwide Tour (2003–2011), the former name of a second-tier men's golf tour
- English Football League, formerly called the Nationwide League
- Kenyan Nationwide League, a league below the top tier of Kenyan football

== Television ==
- Nationwide (TV programme), a British current affairs series (1969–1983)
- Nationwide (Australian TV programme), a current affairs programme (1979–1984)
- Nationwide (Irish TV programme), a regional news programme
- "Nationwide" (Inside Victor Lewis-Smith), a 1993 episode

== Other uses ==
- Nationwide (album) (1990), a noise rock album by Surgery
- Nationwide Arena, a multipurpose arena in Columbus, Ohio, US

== See also ==
- Nationwide League (disambiguation)
