= Zettl =

Zettl is a German-language surname. It may refer to:

- Alex Zettl, American carbon scientist
- Mark Zettl (born 1998), German footballer
- Walter Zettl (1929–2018), German dressage rider and Olympic-level dressage horse trainer
