= Grantsmart =

Non-profit organization for grant seekers

Grantsmart, also known as grantsmart.org, was a non-profit organization founded in 1999 whose mission was to provide online "free access to information that assists grant seekers in locating funding for their projects." In addition to a searchable database it also offered research tools and an on-line discussion forum.

== History ==
Beginning in 2000 the IRS required all United States charitable foundations to file the 990-PF form, which details information for each foundation, including the total value of all assets, the investments held by the foundation, as well as complete listings of gifts, contributions and grants paid to nonprofits during the tax year, and grants that have been approved for future payment. Fundraisers and nonprofit researchers also use 990-PF tax returns to research which individuals or corporations are supporting the foundation, and information about the foundation's officers, directors, trustees, managers and contractors, their compensation, and grant application criteria, deadlines and geographical relationships. By accessing and utilizing the 990-PFs, Grantsmart made information available on all foundations, including ones lacking annual reports or websites. The Grantsmart model enabled persons and organizations seeking foundation funding to bypass print directories and use a simple, comprehensive, searchable free database.

In early 2008 the organization's founders decided to end the project.

== Equipment donations ==
Grantsmart announced its intention to donate the organization's hardware, which included two Apple Xserves with dual G4 processors, mirrored system drives and SCSI boards, one Apple Xserve with dual G5 processors and a fibre channel board; two Nexsan ATAboy RAID arrays (14 ata drives) with dual power supplies and dual SCSI connections with 4 to 6 TB each. In addition they offered a single Nexsan SATAboy RAID array (14 drives) with 9 TB and a fibre channel connection. They invited applicants with a message, "If you have a great project underway that can use some or all of this hardware please drop us an email detailing your project, why it's important and how you can use this hardware."

In addition they offered to make their database and technology, archived in a MySQL database (multithreaded, multi-user SQL database management system) available to any organization that would continue its mission of making the information searchable for free. NOZA, Inc. was chosen and in March 2008 combined Grantsmart's 990-PF database with its own searchable database of donors and nonprofit organizations. Grantsmart donated its Xserve and two NexSan ATAboy RAID arrays (totaling 9 Terabytes) to the SETI project at the University of California at Berkeley, and announced that in January 2008 all remaining hardware and equipment and the domain name would be auctioned on eBay. NOZA, a searchable database dedicated to nonprofits' use, acquired the database and the domain, which now redirects to its Official website.
