= Birdwell =

Birdwell can refer to:

- Birdwell, South Yorkshire, a village in South Yorkshire, England
- Birdwell (clothing), an American clothing company
- Brian Birdwell (born 1961), former U.S. serviceman and member of the Texas Senate
- Dwight W. Birdwell (born 1948), former U.S. serviceman, awarded Medal of Honor

== See also ==
- includes several other holders of the surname
