= Yum-Yum Donuts =

Donut shop chain

Yum Yum Donut Shops, Inc.

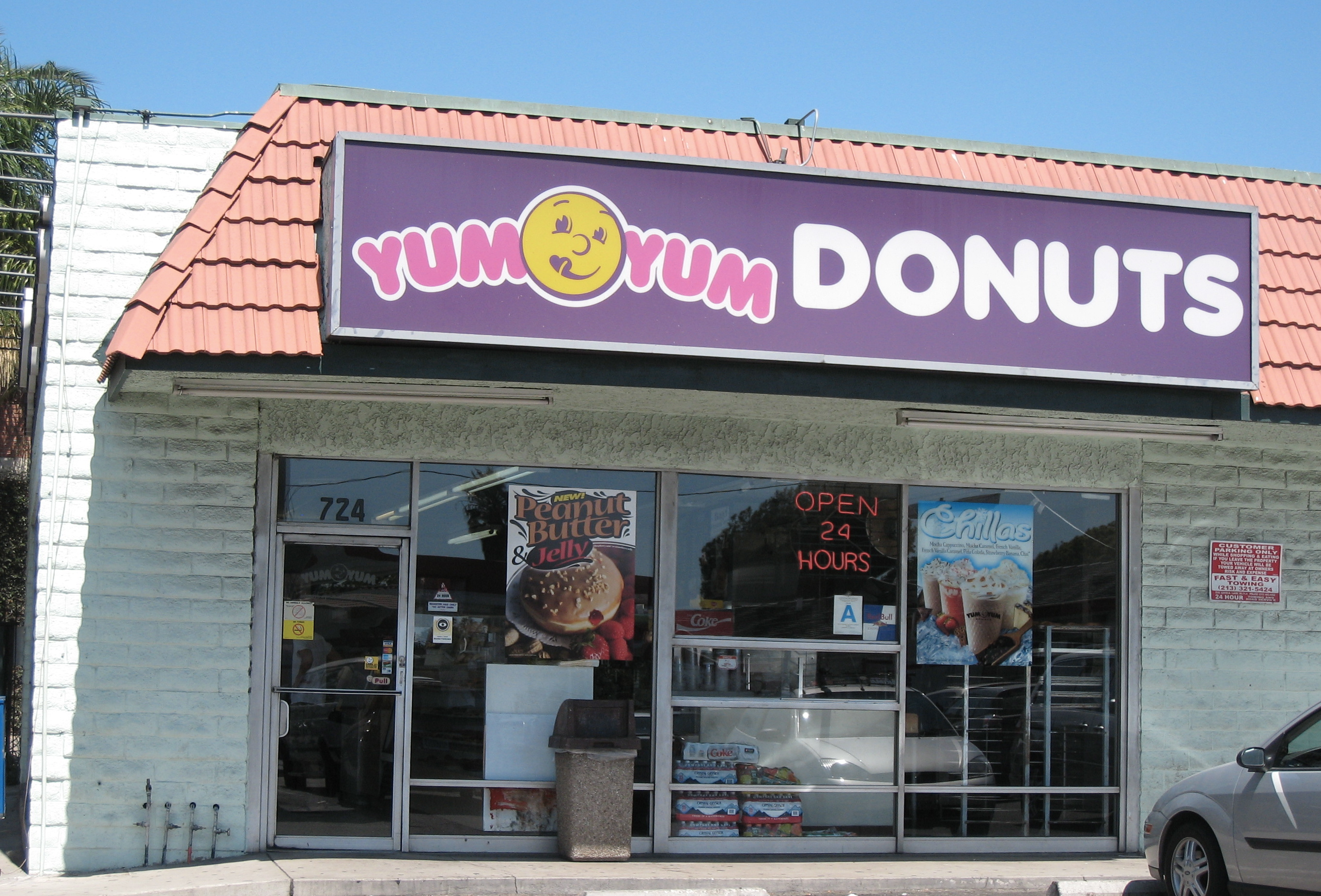
- Yum Yum Donuts on Melrose Avenue in Los Angeles, California
- Trade name: Yum-Yum Donuts
- Type: Private
- Industry: Restaurants
- Genre: Coffeehouse; quick service
- Founded: 1971; 55 years ago Cypress Park, Los Angeles, California, U.S.
- Founder: Phillip C. Holland
- Headquarters: City of Industry, California, U.S.
- Number of locations: 94
- Key people: Lincoln Watase (President)
- Products: Doughnuts; bakery items; sandwiches; coffee; teas
- Owner: Watase family
- Subsidiaries: Winchell's Donuts
- Website: yumyumdonuts.com

Yum Yum Donut Shops, Inc., doing business as Yum-Yum Donuts, is an American donut shop chain based in California. As of 2026, there are 94 stores, all located in California.

== History ==
Phillip C. Holland founded Yum Yum Donuts in 1971 in a former Orange Julius store. The original location, at Avenue 26 and Figueroa Street in the Cypress Park district of Los Angeles, California, is still in operation. Holland met his future business partner, Frank Watase, when he put out a newspaper advertisement seeking a business manager for his first shop. Holland expanded to three shops by 1973, sold half of the company to Watase, and together, they went on to open over 100 stores. In 1989, Holland retired and sold his share of the company to Watase, who owned and operated the company with his son, Lincoln Watase.

In 2004, Yum-Yum Donuts bought Winchell's Donuts, which added 70 shops to the Yum-Yum chain. As of 2019, there were 126 Winchell's and Yum-Yum Donuts shops in the greater Los Angeles area. Yum-Yum Donuts is the largest chain of privately owned donut shops in the United States. Both Yum-Yum Donuts and Winchell's are headquartered in the City of Industry, California.

Frank Watase died September 7, 2020, at the age of 96 and, today, his son Lincoln Watase remains President of Yum-Yum Donuts.

== See also ==
- List of doughnut shops
