= Airpush =

- Type: Private
- Industry: Mobile Advertising
- Founded: 2010
- Headquarters: Los Angeles, California, United States
- Number of locations: Los Angeles; Bangalore
- Key people: Asher Delug; Inman Breaux; David Kawamoto; Andrew Wang
- Number of employees: 250+
- Website: airpush.com

Airpush is a private company founded in 2010 that provides bootstrapped mobile advertising platform. It is known as one of the largest mobile ad platforms with over 120,000 live apps utilizing its SDK. Airpush is based in Los Angeles, California with offices in Bangalore, India.

Airpush was founded in 2010 by company CEO and Interactive Advertising Bureau director Asher Delug. Airpush is a member of the Interactive Advertising Bureau.

== History ==
Airpush launched in December 2010.

In June 2011, Airpush partnered with Nobotto, a Japanese developer of smartphone ad networks. Nobotto used Airpush's technology to distribute its ads in Japan.

In July 2013, Airpush launched AirDSP, a mobile real-time bidding platform for advertisers.

Airpush acquired Hubbl, a New York City-based developer of native advertising platforms, in October 2013. Hubbl was acquired for $15 million.

Forbes ranked Airpush #2 on its 2014 list of America's Most Promising Companies. In July 2014, Airpush received the DataWeek + API World 2014 award for Most Innovative Advertising Data Solution.

In 2015, the company launched VirtualSKY, an advertising platform that allowed clients to create and place ads in virtual reality (VR) games and videos. The platform is also able to track where consumers are looking during ads. VirtualSKY's first VR clients included PETA, Stand Up to Cancer and Charity: Water. In 2016, Post Cereals worked with the VirtualSKY platform to create a VR campaign for Pebbles cereal.

In 2016, Airpush released the mobi.info advertising platform. The platform allows app publishers the ability to monetize data collected by their apps whether or not the app shows an ad. The platform may also allow consumers to see less ads, while increasing their relevance.

== Products ==
At launch, the Airpush platform utilized push notifications. The company's platform has expanded to include banner, icon, video, app wall, dialog, landing page and rich media advertisements.

Airpush also offers AirDSP, a mobile real time bidding platform. Included in AirDSP is Optimizer, which provides metrics and reports to advertisers.

In February 2014, Airpush and OpenX launched AirX, a mobile private exchange.

== Criticism ==
Airpush has received criticism for utilizing push notifications. In response, Airpush introduced options, which required end-users to opt into its service.

== See also ==
- Mobile marketing
- Cloud computing
- Advertising network
