= The Aaron Sims Company =

Visual effects studio in Los Angeles

Aaron Sims Creative
- Industry: Production; Visual Effects
- Founded: 2005
- Headquarters: Los Angeles, California
- Key people: Aaron Sims (President, CEO); Steffen Reichstadt (Creative Director); Tyler Winther (Head of Development)
- Services: Development; Design; Previs; VFX; AR/VR; 3D Print
- Website: aaronsimscreative.com

Aaron Sims Creative is a studio in Los Angeles, California that creates visual effects for film, television and gaming. Founded in 2005 by Aaron Sims, it provides a variety of services including concept design and development, 3D printing, previs and real-time VFX, augmented and virtual reality, and video game development.

== Background ==
Aaron Sims began his career as a special effects artist under Rick Baker and Stan Winston, where he helped develop visual-effects techniques that had a significant influence on character and concept design for film and television. In 2005, he founded Aaron Sims Creative to create and realize characters, creatures and environments for all entertainment platforms.

== Feature film projects ==
- Skinwalkers (2006)
- The Hills Have Eyes II (2007)
- Dead Silence (2007)
- Hairspray (2007)
- 30 Days of Night (2007)
- Fred Claus (2007)
- The Mist (2007)
- The Golden Compass (2007)
- I Am Legend (2007)
- One Missed Call (2008)
- The Chronicles of Narnia: Prince Caspian (2008)
- The Incredible Hulk (2008)
- The Mummy: Tomb of the Dragon Emperor (2008)
- The Day the Earth Stood Still (2008)
- The Spirit (2008)
- Blood Creek (2009)
- The Unborn (2009)
- Blood: The Last Vampire (2009)
- X-Men Origins: Wolverine (2009)
- Cirque du Freak: The Vampire's Assistant (2009)
- Percy Jackson & the Olympians: The Lightning Thief (2010)
- Clash of the Titans (2010)
- Insidious (2010)
- Sucker Punch (2011)
- Hop (2011)
- X-Men: First Class (2011)
- Green Lantern (2011)
- Transformers: Dark of the Moon (2011)
- Rise of the Planet of the Apes (2011)
- The Thing (2011)
- Rites of Spring (2011)
- The Twilight Saga: Breaking Dawn Part 1 (2011)
- Wrath of the Titans (2012)
- The Apparition (2012)
- The Amazing Spider-Man (2012)
- Abraham Lincoln: Vampire Hunter (2012)
- The Twilight Saga: Breaking Dawn Part 2 (2012)
- G.I. Joe: Retaliation (2013)
- 300: Rise of an Empire (2014)
- I, Frankenstein (2014)
- Lights Out (2016)

== Television ==
- The River
- Falling Skies

== Video games ==
- Prototype
- Command & Conquer 3: Tiberium Wars
- Untold Legends: Dark Kingdom
- Infamous 2

== Commercial campaigns ==
- DirecTV
- Mercedes-Benz
- McDonald's
- Budweiser
- Toyota
- Jose Cuervo
- Gillette
- Energizer
- Verizon Wireless
- Autotrader
- DHL
