= Brown Safe Manufacturing =

Brown Safe Manufacturing, Inc.
- Company type: Private (family owned)
- Industry: Manufacturing
- Founded: 1980 (45 years ago) in California, U.S.
- Founder: Frederick Brown
- Headquarters: Vista, California, U.S.
- Products: Safes and vaults
- Number of employees: 60+
- Website: brownsafe.com

Brown Safe Manufacturing, Inc. is a family-owned security company that primarily manufacturers high-security custom and luxury safes and vaults, headquartered in Vista, California.

== History ==
Founded in 1980 by Fredrick Brown, Brown Safe Manufacturing Inc. was created with the intention to manufacture the world's most-secure safes.

Inspired by the engineering projects of his father and grandfather, Fredrick Brown set out to pursue his own work in the area of mechanical design. Brown graduated in 1976 with a Bachelor of Science degree in engineering from San Diego State University. Soon Frederick Brown's mechanical understanding and fascination with complex devices led him into the world of safe design.

Demand for Brown Safes remained fairly level throughout the 1990s as there were numerous local manufacturers and competition was strong. Soon an influx of highly affordable and less-well-built safes imported primarily from China rapidly put most American safe builders out of business. The few safe builders that survived did so primarily by employing the same strategy that nearly took them down. They built low-grade safes that could compete directly with the imports based on manufacturing costs. Many builders abandoned their role as manufacturers and became resellers of imported safes.

Safe sales dwindled and the family business struggled for years, relying primarily on military contracts and a dedicated employee base to weather those turbulent times.

The start of the 21st century and the rise of the internet brought tremendous opportunity for renewed growth to Brown Safe. It provided the perfect means to market high-end safes to a much larger market. With the help of an internet-savvy daughter and a now-highly-technical-minded son, Brown Safe launched its first website early in 2000.

Today, Brown Safe's facilities occupy over 85,000 square feet (7,900 m^{2}), employing a workforce of over sixty people, along with contracting out to numerous external agencies. Demand for Brown Safes continues at a steady pace.
