= Undrest =

American clothing brand

Undrest. is an American clothing brand owned by WEARUNDER, Inc. based in the Garment District of Downtown Los Angeles, California. The company represents a growing group of clothing companies that embrace the idea of progressive labor policies that include production, development, and manufacturing all within the United States. Its main garment line consists of high end intimate apparels made of 100% U.S. grown Supima cotton, knit and manufactured in "sweatshop free" garment contract facilities in Los Angeles, California. The main line includes babydolls, bedjackets, boy shorts, camisoles, chemises, nightshirts, panties, and bralettes.

== History ==
Undrest. launched its first collection in January 2007 for the spring/summer 2007. Maria Paz Navales is the founder and designer. Her inspiration for the line comes from various elements such as a 1940s Austrian bodysuit, colors inspired by Spanish flamenco posters from the 1930s, Harper's Bazaar magazine covers from the 1920s illustrated by artist/designer Erté, and from her travels to Rio de Janeiro and São Paulo, being exposed to the local lingerie fashions.
