= Altegris =

- Type: Private
- Industry: Financial services
- Founded: 2002
- Founder: Matt Osborne; Jon Sundt; Robert Amedeo; Richard Pfister
- Headquarters: San Diego, California
- Key people: Matt Osborne (CEO, CIO, & Co-Founder); Beth Strong(Head of Operations and Technology); Joe Colombo (Director of Research); Doug Grip (Board Chairman)
- Products: Alternative Investments
- Website: https://altegris.com/

Altegris is an alternative investment firm headquartered in San Diego.

== History ==
Based in San Diego, California, Altegris was founded in 2002, by Jon Sundt, Matt Osborne, Robert Amedeo and Richard Pfister. Osborne is chief executive officer and chief information officer.

== Acquisitions ==
Altegris was acquired by Genworth Financial in 2010 for $35 million.

Genworth sold its stake, and the Altegris group was acquired in 2013 by private equity firms Aquiline Capital Partners LLC and Genstar Capital.

In 2018, Altegris merged with Artivest. On September 9, 2020, Altegris announced that it had regained control of its assets from Artivest, and was rebranding as an independent company.
