= FinalCode =

- Type: Private
- Industry: Computer Software
- Founded: 2014; 12 years ago
- Headquarters: San Jose, California, United States (US)
- Area served: San Jose, California; Singapore; Japan; Australia; United Kingdom
- Services: Information Rights Management
- Website: finalcode.com

FinalCode, Inc. is a multi-national software company that provides data-centric security and information rights management (IRM) to help enterprises mitigate data leakage and meet compliance requirements. FinalCode allows users to securely collaborate and share files using any communication channel, including existing Enterprise Content Management (ECM), Cloud Storage and collaboration applications.

FinalCode is privately held and headquartered in San Jose, California, with additional offices in Singapore, Japan, Australia and United Kingdom.

== History ==
FinalCode, Inc was founded in 2014.

As part of an international expansion FinalCode opened a regional headquarters in Singapore in May 2016.

In September 2016 an additional regional headquarter was opened in London, UK, to cover the EMEA region.

FinalCode also has additional offices and presence in Japan and Australia.

== Features ==
FinalCode provides AES-256 encryption, granular permission sets, corporate and user policy templates, file lifecycle activity analytics, dynamic policy modification, and the ability to remotely delete files after they have been shared.

== Patented Technology ==
FinalCode's patented CryptoEase technology adds a layer of file protection that remains persistent whether the file circulates internally or outside an organization. Offering a comprehensive file-based Information Rights Management (IRM) that allows organizations and file owner retains comprehensive file control and auditing capability with the means recipients and usage permissions or delete files remotely.

== Industry Standards ==
FinalCode achieved Federal Information Processing Standards (FIPS) certification for FinalCode Crypto Module and FinalCode Crypto Module for Mobile.

FinalCode is also Suite-B compliant.

These standards are integrated into the current FinalCode solution.

== Awards and recognition ==
In 2017, FinalCode was named "Hot Product" at RSA Conference 2017. In 2016, FinalCode earned Ovum "on the radar" award.

Gartner designated FinalCode as a "Cool Vendor" in 2015.
