= Surf Diva =

- Industry: Retail
- Founded: 1996
- Founder: Izzy Tihanyi; Coco Tihanyi
- Headquarters: La Jolla, California
- Products: Surfboards; Clothing
- Website: https://surfdiva.com/

Surf Diva is a surf school and shop based in La Jolla, a community in San Diego, California. It offers surfing lessons at the nearby La Jolla Shores beach. Originally an all-women's surf school, co-ed classes are now offered. Surf Diva also offers a seasonal surf retreat in Costa Rica.

== History ==
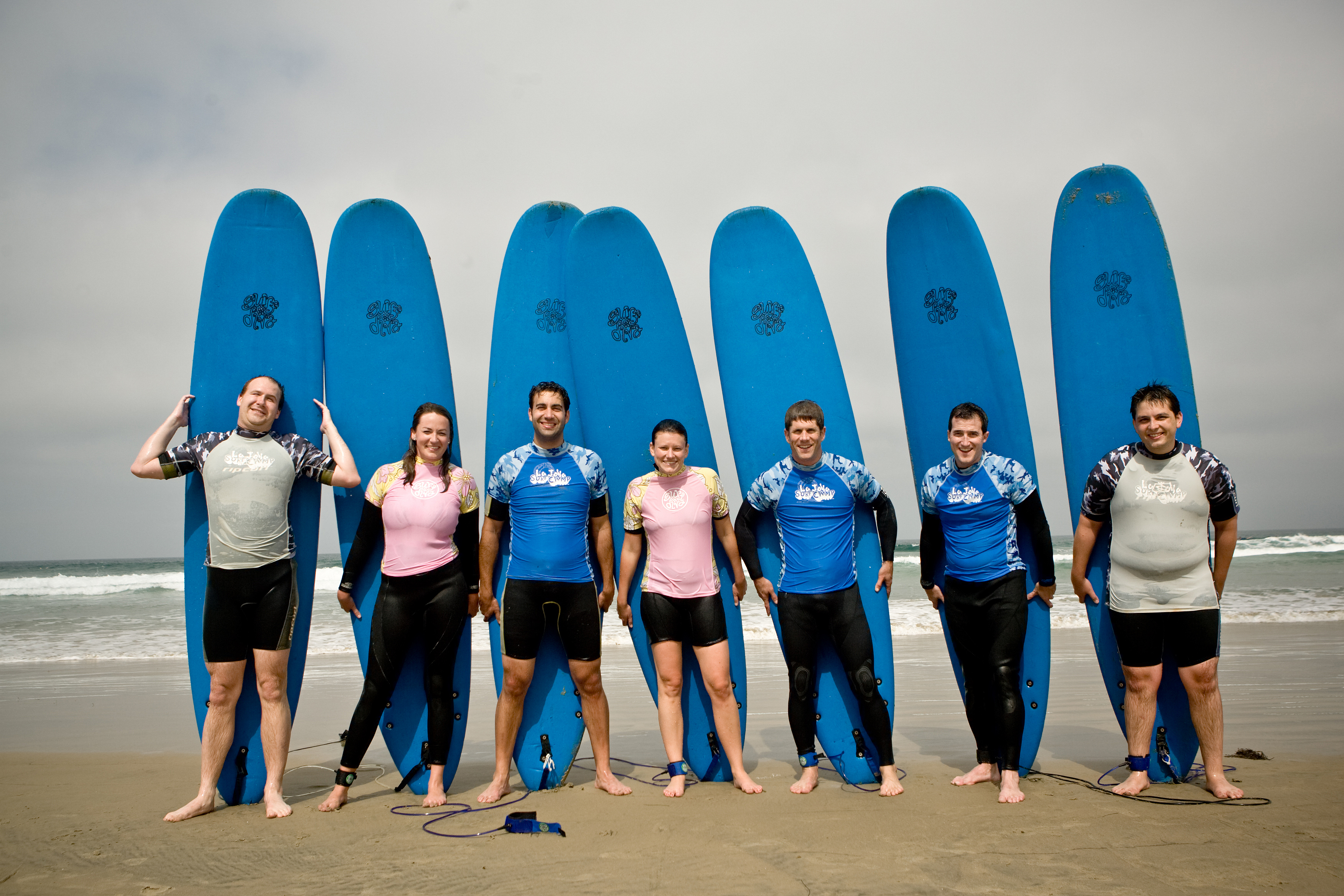
A class of surfers

Surf Diva was founded by twin sisters, Isabelle "Izzy" Tihanyi and Caroline "Coco" Tihanyi. Both Izzy and Coco were interested in surfing from a young age due to their upbringing by their father who was a competitive water polo player. The two twin sisters also have a younger sister, Valerie, who grew up with them in La Jolla, but lives in France with her husband. Izzy began surfing when she was eight years old, and all three sisters were taught how to surf by their father.

In 1996, Izzy and Coco Tihanyi opened Surf Diva, the first surf school that specifically catered to women. It was established in the coastal community of La Jolla where the sisters grew up surfing. The surf school was initially focused on providing surf lessons to women, but in 2002, the school expanded their offerings to include co-ed classes.

Surf Diva expanded its surfing programs to grow the business by acquiring La Jolla Surf Camp in 2003, and the Australian Surf Academy for teens in 2005. In 2003, Surf Diva also began a surf camp in Nosara, Costa Rica, with a program called “Welcome to the Jungle.”

In 2004, Surf Diva expanded, taking over the liquor store beneath their upstairs headquarters, to open a storefront, The Surf Diva Boutique. The shop carries general merchandise as well as Surf Diva branded clothing and accessories designed by Coco Tihanyi. Surf Diva branded surfboards are also sold in the store, designed by Izzy Tihanyi. Surftech surfboards manufactured and sold Surf Diva surfboards through a global license. Surf Diva fiberglass surfboards have been shaped since 1996 by shaper Craig Hollingsworth, a well-known surfboard shaper in the surf industry.

In 2005, Izzy and Coco Tihanyi released their first published book, Surf Diva: A Girl's Guide to Getting Good Waves. Aside from a how-to guide for women's surfing, the book also featured ways to find welcoming beach spots, selecting the perfect surfboard, recovering from wipeouts and general attitude and style of a surfer. It also offered advice from professional surfers, testimonials from surf students and instructors, and safety tips. The book was published by Harcourt Press with national distribution and has sold over 30,000 copies.

In 2011, Surf Diva added standup paddleboarding to their offerings, commonly known in the industry as SUP, to their school instruction. They collaborated with Focus SUP and created their own line of standup paddleboards beginning in 2012.

== Founders ==
After graduating from La Jolla High School, Izzy and Coco both attended the University of California, San Diego (UCSD), graduating in 1989. Izzy earned a Bachelor’s degree with a double major in communication and literature/writing, Coco earned a Bachelor’s degree in communication. While studying at UCSD, Izzy competed for their women's surfing team. She also began surfing competitively in surf industry contests and teaching the sport to other women as well. Izzy is also a former National Scholastic Surfing Association (NSSA) collegiate overall points champion.

Both sisters have also previously worked in the surf industry, with Izzy behind the scenes and as a show producer of a local television show for action sports, called STV (Snow, Skate, Surf Television). Izzy also worked at Transworld Media and managed events including Board Aid. Coco worked for surf brands including as an Assistant National Sales Manager for REEF sandals.

Izzy taught surfing in college and later for the La Jolla YMCA and at San Diego State University. She posted flyers at local women’s shop, Water Girl, after finding out their female clientele was not buying the boards because they did not know how to surf. From that flyer, Izzy got enough women interested to set up continuous weekend surf clinics and ultimately expand it into a business.

== Mission and philosophy ==
Surf Diva's mission has always been to empower women through surfing. They believe that surfing is not just a sport but also a way to build self-confidence, strength, and a sense of community. Their philosophy revolves around the idea that women can excel and be empowered to surf in a fun and encouraging environment surrounded by other women.

They also emphasize the importance of ocean skills, as well as sustainability and environmental preservation, and consciousness through their work with the Surfrider Foundation, who has partnered with Surf Diva in past events to present classes to the campers on ocean conservation.

=== Promoting women's surfing ===
In 1998-99, Izzy Tihanyi was invited to bring Surf Diva on the VANS Warped Tour as part of the Ladies Lounge organization which had partnered with the VANS Warped Tour for promoting inclusion of more women in surf-skate-snow-bmx sports, during its action sports and music themed concert. Izzy toured with the Ladies Lounge and VANS Warped Tour concert during the west coast leg of the tour, promoting Surf Diva and women’s surfing.

Surf Diva also helped the Girl Scouts of the USA to develop the program behind the surfing merit badge, which the San Diego council of the Girl Scouts began offering in 2000.

In 2020, co-founder Izzy Tihanyi was invited to also serve as a panelist to speak at the Surf Park Central Summit at the Scripps Seaside Forum in La Jolla, about new opportunities for the growing movement of wave pools and surf parks in landlocked areas, to unlock greater participation of women in the sport of surfing.

In 2021, Surf Diva celebrated 25 years of being recognized in the world as the original all-women’s surf school.

=== Contributions ===
Surf Diva is actively involved in charities and outreach programs to support both the local community and to raise awareness to protect the environment. To date, Surf Diva has been involved with the Surfrider Foundation, Coastkeeper, Life Rolls On Foundation, Freedom is Not Free, TOMS Shoes, and Liquid Nation. They have also made charitable contributions by donating surf school lessons to women focused and conservation causes, and to local schools in the community.

=== Legacy ===
Izzy and Coco Tihanyi have been praised by other women entrepreneurs including award-winning podcast host of REI’s Wild Ideas Worth Living, TedTalk speaker and published author Shelby Stanger who commended Surf Diva for their work in amplifying women’s role in surfing. They were also praised for running a successful women’s surf brand in the male-dominated surf industry, by Sean Smith, Executive Director of the Surf Industry Manufacturers Association (SIMA), who commented in 2014 by saying, “They’re not putting on an act and they’re not outsiders trying to take advantage of a trend. They’ve definitely grown up with surfing, and it’s very clear.”

Izzy and Coco Tihanyi have credited their strong work ethic as having been instilled from an early age by being raised by immigrant parents.

== Awards and honors ==
Since its inception, Surf Diva has received several awards and honors including:

- 2001: Awarded "Cool Women of the Year" by Girl Scouts of America
- 2003: Surfrider Foundation Stewardship Award
- 2003: Surfrider Foundation Waterperson Award
- 2004: City of Anaheim Women of Sports
- 2005: Named "Top 26 Entrepreneurs" by Inc. Magazine
- 2005: Small Business of the Year Award by the State of California 75th District
- 2007, 2008, 2009, 2010: Voted San Diego’s "Best Beachwear" store in San Diego
- 2007-2009: Voted #1 beachwear shop by ABC News
- 2008: Awarded "Entrepreneur of 2008" by Action Sports Innovators
- 2008: Named one of the nations “Sexiest Wet n Wild Jobs” on E! Entertainment Network
- 2010: Founding Member, Friends of Olympic Surfing
- 2012: Pacific Women’s Sports Foundation, Inspiration Award
- 2013: Awarded “Women's Retailer of the Year” by SIMA (Surfing Industry Members Association)
- 2019: Trailblazer Award by NAWBO (National Association of Women Business Owners
- 2020: Surf Diva was voted Best Surf Shop in the La Jolla Light’s Best of La Jolla readers’ poll
- 2021: Surf Diva was voted Best Surf Shop in the La Jolla Light’s Best of La Jolla readers’ poll
- 2022: Surf Diva was voted Best Surf Shop in the La Jolla Light’s Best of La Jolla readers' poll

== Media recognition ==
Surf Diva has been featured on CNN, MTV, ESPN, MSNBC, NBC, Today Show, E! Entertainment, The Travel Channel, as well as others. They have also been featured in various publications including INC Magazine, Entrepreneur Magazine, Time Magazine, Wall St. Journal, New York Times, L.A. Times, USA Today, InStyle, Sunset, Vogue, Glamour, Cosmopolitan, GQ, Newsweek, Oprah’s Magazine, Condé Nast Travel Magazine and many other newspapers and publications.

Surf Diva has also had many celebrity clients who have either taken a surf lesson or visited their surf storefront including: actor Will Ferrell, actress Busy Phillips, actress Helen Hunt, British Olympic gold medalist and diver Tom Daley, actress and show host Drew Barrymore, actress Alyssa Milano, journalist Lisa Ling, actress Minnie Driver, reality star Audrina Patridge and Kendra Wilkinson.
