= Minor thread =

Minor Thread is a handmade goods company from California, founded in 2003.

== History ==
Minor Thread began in Oakland, California as a line of one-off totes and accessories made from recycled materials. The company moved to Los Angeles in 2009 and has begun creating organic tea and spice blends, along with organic herbal sachets.
