= American River Bank =

Community bank founded in 1983

- Company type: Public
- Traded as: Nasdaq: AMRB
- Industry: Banking
- Founded: 1983; 43 years ago
- Defunct: 2021
- Headquarters: Sacramento, California
- Key people: David E. Ritchie (CEO)
- Revenue: $23,600,000
- Number of employees: 107
- Website: AmericanRiverBank.com

American River Bank was a community bank founded in 1983 by Robert H. Daneke, who served as first president and CEO, and Bill L. Withrow, the first Chairman of the Board, and served the Greater Sacramento area in California. As of 2019, It operated ten branches in Northern CA. American River Bank which offered both business and personal financial services and was a wholly owned subsidiary of American River Bankshares.

== History ==
American River Bank was founded in Fair Oaks, California by Robert H. Daneke who served as first President and CEO and William Young. Throughout its history it acquired several banks, such as the North Coast Bank, Bank of Amador, as well as the Placer Bank of Commerce. In October 2005, it opened up its sixth branch located in Rancho Cordova, California. The bank ended 2006 with $563.2 million in assets, down 1.8 percent from $573.7 million in 2007.

The company was acquired by Nasdaq-listed Bank of Marin on August 6, 2021, in an all stock deal with American River being delisted from the Nasdaq.
