= Gram Power =

Indian energy technology company

Gram Power is an energy technology company founded in 2010 out of University of California Berkeley. The company addresses electrification challenges in developing nations and set up India's first solar powered smart microgrid in the Rajasthan hamlet of Khareda Lakshmipura in March 2012. The company provides on-demand, theft-proof power which end users may purchase as needed and was selected among the top 10 Cleantech Innovations by NASA in 2011.

== Founders ==
Gram Power's founders are Yashraj Khaitan and Jacob Dickinson, engineering graduates of the University of California, Berkeley, with support from Eric Brewer.

== Microgrid ==
Gram Power's microgrid is powered by a centralized array of solar panels and battery array to collect and store DC energy. It is converted to AC electricity via an inverter and distributed via overhead power lines. The system is monitored wirelessly for energy theft or other usage abnormalities.

Households on the grid have a prepaid smart meter that draws energy from the microgrid, tracks remaining energy credits, and provides feedback for users about the power consumption of their appliances. Credits for the meters are purchased from local sellers who buy from the company at bulk rates. Gram Power's microgrids can also be integrated with the utility grid.
