= SysIQ, Inc. =

- Company type: Private company
- Industry: eCommerce
- Founded: 2000
- Headquarters: San Francisco, California, United States
- Key people: Igor Gorin, Founder & CEO; Ilya Vinogradsky, Founder & CTO; Roman Martynenko, Founder & CFO
- Website: sysiq.com

SysIQ, Inc. is an electronic commerce provider based in San Francisco, California and offices overseas particularly in Ukraine. The company provides full range of custom services from development through marketing that includes system integration, search engine optimization and branding. Along with the Haas School of Business at the University of California, Berkeley SysIQ launched the Internet Consumer Purchase Behavior Study (ICPBS) - a first academic tool for evaluating user experience. In 2010 SysIQ developed an online Return on Investment calculation tool to help ecommerce retailers to determine possible ROI prior actually changing ecommerce website. In 2012 SysIQ developed first mobile device adapted website for restaurant equipment parts distributor with full online catalog.

== Clients ==
SysIQ clients include Woodland Hills, Men's Wearhouse, Parts Town, Sam Ash Music, Gumps, Moss Motors and more.

== Notables ==
Since 2010 SysIQ offers PIM system based on Heiler Product Management Platform for ecommerce with IBM WebSphere Commerce and Intershop Enfinity Suite combined.
