= Answer Underground =

Social Education Company based in San Francisco, California, United States

- Type: Private
- Industry: Mobile, Social, elearning, online tutoring
- Founded: San Francisco, California, United States (2012)
- Founder: Sallie Severns, CEO
- Headquarters: San Francisco, California, U.S.
- Area served: U.S.
- Products: Answer Underground
- Website: www.answerunderground.com

Answer Underground was a social education company based in San Francisco, California. It developed an app for teachers and students to find information via group Q&A.

== History ==
Answer Underground was founded in 2012 by Sallie Severns, a former executive at information company Answers.com. Severns created the first prototype of the Answer Underground app in 2011, and it was released to open beta in May 2012.

== Service ==
Originally, the Answer Underground app was designed for mobile devices and was optimized for iOS. Users were authenticated through Facebook.

The app focused on academic groups categorized by major subject areas. Members were able to post questions to academic groups. In 2013, a verification feature was added to identify experienced academics to differentiate credible responses.
