= Sendio =

American e-mail security company

- Company type: Private
- Industry: E-mail security
- Founded: 2003; 23 years ago
- Headquarters: Newport Beach, California, United States
- Products: E-mail Security Platform (ESP)
- Website: Official website

Sendio is a Newport Beach, California-based e-mail security company. The privately held company was founded in 2003 by Tal Golan, who currently serves as the company's president and CTO. By using Sender Address Verification technology, Sendio provides an e-mail security solution which stops spam, viruses, malware, phishing attacks and unsolicited e-mail from reaching the e-mail inbox. In February 2007, Sendio received $4 million in venture capital funding from Vicente Capital, Shepherd Ventures and Athenian Venture Partners. Former Microsoft CIO Rick Devenuti was appointed to the Board of Directors at Sendio in 2007.

Sendio customers include Central DuPage Hospital, Arnerich Massena, Inc., The Leading Hotels of the World, Penn State and Sentinel Real Estate Corporation.

== Technology ==
Sendio's E-mail Security Platform, (formerly named I.C.E. Box) is an appliance solution which eliminates spam and viruses. The E-mail Security Platform (ESP) uses a verification model with first-time, unsolicited senders and scans for viruses and phishing in both directions. Outbound message recipients are added to the user's personal accept contact list. Once authenticated, all subsequent messages from that sender are assured of reaching the recipient's inbox.

ESP combines Silverlisting, a technology which includes a set of low-level simple mail transfer protocol (SMTP) tests to determine the legitimacy of the sending e-mail server, and Sender Address Verification, which verifies the authenticity of first-time, unsolicited senders, and introduces a human element into the process. This combination of Silverlisting and SAV prevents 100% of spam.

ESP employs a verification model similar to the one embraced by millions of social networking users, such as Facebook and LinkedIn, and the “buddy” list model used by leading instant messaging providers such as Skype, Yahoo!, Google and AOL.

== Recognition ==
Sendio's I.C.E. Box was named the "Best of the Best" product of the year in 2006 by Government Computer News and as the eMail Integrity Award Winner 2007 by Tomorrow's Technology Today.

Sendio was named as an emerging vendor by CRN Magazine in the security technology sector in June 2008.
