= Rescue One Financial =

Rescue One Financial, LLC.
- Type: Private
- Industry: Financial services
- Founded: 2007; 19 years ago
- Headquarters: Irvine, California, United States
- Key people: Bradley Smith, Mark Photoglou, and Branden Millstone, Co-Founders and CEOs
- Products: debt management, debt consolidation
- Website: rescueonefinancial.com

Rescue One Financial is an American debt management and debt consolidation company located in Irvine, CA. It provides services to individuals that have debt problems by consolidate their debts into one new loan to reduce outstanding debts. They also assist in reducing debt through negotiation repayment plans. The company is a member of the American Fair Credit Council.

== History ==
Rescue One Financial was founded in 2007 by Bradley Smith, Mark Photoglou, and Branden Millstone with a focus on consumer debt management. Services are offered in 31 states. The company manages $2 billion of consumer debt, with over 750 million dollars of unsecured debt settled.

In 2013, the company showed a three-year growth of 1,406%, with revenues of $31.6 Million in 2012, compared to $2.1 Million in 2009. During that time, they added 26 jobs, bringing the total number of employees for 2013 to 53. Currently, the company boasts 181 employees in 2019.

Co-Founder and CEO Bradley Smith was previously a key player in a notable Rule 144 trade at Merrill Lynch, selling more than 5 million shares of The Walt Disney Company. Smith was featured in Inc. Magazine in September 2010 as "America's Fastest Growing Debt Collector", in Inc's award-winning article "The Psychological Price of Entrepreneurship" by Jessica Bruder in September 2013, and has been featured in the media as a financial expert. The Deadline Club award in Magazine Personal Service category was won for the article "The Psychological Price of Entrepreneurship". Smith was also named part of the Forbes Executive Financial Council and the company manages over 100,000 clients.

== Accreditations ==
- The company is Member of the AFCC, The American Fair Credit Council.
- The company is Certified by the International Association of Professional Debt Arbitrators (IAPDA).
- The company is a member of the United States Organizations for Bankruptcy Alternatives (USOBA).

== See also ==
- Bankruptcy
- Debt
- Credit Counseling
- List of finance topics
