= ACT Biotech Inc =

American biopharmaceutical company

ACT Biotech Inc is a San Francisco-based, privately held biopharmaceutical company focused on the development and commercialization of targeted cancer drugs. It was founded in 2008.

The Company's clinical stage pipeline includes:

- Telatinib, an oral kinase inhibitor for the first-line treatment of advanced gastric cancer. It has been granted Orphan Drug status by the U.S. Food and Drug Administration (FDA). It has reported encouraging interim results from a phase II trial.
- ACTB1003, an oral kinase inhibitor that targets cancer cells through multiple modes of action. It inhibits cancer cell growth by targeting the FGF receptor family, which are mutated in a number of human cancer types. ACTB1003 also directly induces apoptosis by targeting kinases downstream of the PI3K pathway, all at low nanomolar concentrations.

Other pipeline products include an oral Aurora A and B kinase inhibitor at the pre-IND stage, and an ABL tyrosine kinase inhibitor targeting the T315I mutant enzyme in pre-clinical development.
