= You Bar =

American food company

- Company type: Private
- Founded: 2006
- Founder: Ava Bise; Anthony Flynn

YouBar is an American food manufacturing company that produce protein bars, baked goods, and functional snack products for private-label and branded clients.

== History ==
YouBar was founded in 2006 by Anthony Flynn and Ava Bise. The company originated from a home-based operation producing protein bars, which later expanded into commercial production. In its early years, YouBar operated an online platform that allowed customers to create customized protein bars by selecting ingredients.

In 2011, YouBar relocated to a facility in downtown Los Angeles and subsequently expanded its operations into contract manufacturing.

Later in 2012, the company discontinued its direct-to-consumer customization service and transitioned fully to contract manufacturing for other brands. Over time, additional members of the founding family joined the company’s management, with Anthony Flynn continuing as chief executive officer.

== Operations ==
As of 2025, YouBar operates multiple food production facilities in the Los Angeles metropolitan area. These facilities are used for the manufacturing and packaging of protein-based snack products, including baked and extruded items. The company utilizes a combination of automated and manual production processes to accommodate different product formats.

YouBar also maintains an internal research and development operation focused on product formulation and process scaling. Product development is conducted in collaboration with clients and includes formulation testing and preparation for commercial production.

== Product ==
YouBar manufactures a range of protein-focused and functional snack products, including bars and baked snack items. The company has expanded beyond traditional protein bars to include bakery-style products. Its products are distributed under third-party brand names through national retail and e-commerce channels in the United States.
