= Building Materials Holding Corporation =

BMC - Building Materials and Construction Solutions
- Company type: Public
- Traded as: Nasdaq: BMCH
- Industry: Building Materials and Construction Services
- Founded: 1987; 39 years ago, in Boise, Idaho as BMC West
- Fate: Acquired by Builders FirstSource
- Headquarters: Raleigh, North Carolina
- Number of employees: 9,500 (2017)
- Website: www.buildwithbmc.com

Building Materials and Construction Solutions (BMC) is an American construction supply company with corporate headquarters in Raleigh, North Carolina. The company operates principally in the South and West regions of the United States and has in excess of 9,000 employees. In 2021, the company merged with Builders FirstSource in an all-stock deal.

== History ==
BMC was founded in 1987 as a building materials distributor. BMC distributes building materials, manufactures building components, and provides construction services across the U.S.

Ready-Frame was launched in 2006, and was known as the Optimized Wall Division. After the bankruptcy, it was renamed to Ready-Frame in 2013. This service provides professional builders with computerized pre-cut framing lumber for constructing roof and floor trusses. The online business, BuildwithBMC.com, was launched in 2015 and carries over 40,000 items.

On August 28, 2018, It was announced that BMC Stock Holdings would move its headquarters from Atlanta to Raleigh, North Carolina effective September 30, 2018. The move came 3 years after it merged with STOCK building Supply (which formed the name BMC Stock Holdings) in 2015, (STOCK Building Supply is also a Raleigh-based company).

== Markets ==
The firm operates in 18 states spanning from the Pacific Northwest to the Mid-Atlantic coast with locations in 45 metropolitan areas.
