= Elanex =

American translation services company

Elanex, Inc.
- Type: Private company
- Industry: Translation services
- Founded: 2002 in San Francisco, California, USA
- Headquarters: San Francisco, California, USA
- Key people: Donald Plumley (Chairman, CEO, President); Jonathan Kirk (Founder)
- Products: Language localization, translation, interpreting, machine translation
- Parent: Straker Translations
- Website: www.elanex.com

Elanex, Inc. commonly known as Elanex, was a translation services company based in San Francisco, California, USA. The company was acquired by Straker Translations of New Zealand in February 2017. Elanex provided localization, translation, and interpreting services. Elanex primarily offered professional human translation, managed by an advanced internally developed technology platform. They primarily served the high technology, financial services, manufacturing, energy, retail, and mergers and acquisitions (M&A) industries.

== History ==
The company was founded in 2002 by Jonathan Kirk, has operations in Silicon Valley, Seattle, Washington, New York, New York, San Francisco, California, USA; Tokyo, Japan; London, England; Sydney, Australia; Montreal, Quebec, and Canada.

In June, 2012, Elanex launched expressIt, a rapid response translation service that marries the best of professional human translators with AI-guided automatic workflow.

In September, 2014, Elanex launched VeriFast, a service that combines machine translation with expert human verification. Building on Elanex's automation and workflow technologies, it enables large volumes of content to be quickly translated and reviewed for accuracy.

== See also ==
- Translation Search Engine
