= Application Networks =

- Industry: Software Development
- Defunct: June 2006
- Fate: Acquired by Reuters
- Headquarters: Palo Alto, California, United States
- Products: JRisk

Application Networks Inc. (AppNet) was a Palo Alto–based company, provider of JRisk, a packaged financial risk management software to use on-premises or as part of cloud computing environments. Its customers included global banks. Banks used JRisk for the risk management of their portfolio of securities, OTC contracts and financial derivative transactions.

Application Networks Inc. was acquired by Reuters in June 2006.
