= MicroPower Technologies =

- Company type: Private
- Industry: Video surveillance
- Founded: 2008, San Diego, California
- Defunct: 2016, San Diego, California
- Headquarters: San Diego, California, United States
- Key people: Aaron Tankersley, President and CEO
- Products: Solar wireless surveillance solutions
- Website: www.micropower.com

MicroPower Technologies was a company based in San Diego, California, that developed solar-powered wireless video camera technology from 2008 until 2016.

MicroPower was financially supported in 2008 by the angel investor network in its entirety, Tech Coast Angels. In August 2013, MicroPower Technologies also announced $5.7M in new funding.

On January 9, 2012, MicroPower announced a $6.5 million round of investment which included funding by Motorola Solutions Venture Capital, the strategic investment arm of Motorola Solutions (NSYE:MSI).

== Awards ==
In 2014, MicroPower won the American Technology Award for green technology.

MicroPower won the 2010 Telecom Council of Silicon Valley SPIFFY award for most disruptive technology.

The 2011 ASIS International (American Society for Industrial Security) show awarded MicroPower a "New Product of the Year Award" in the "Security Products" division.

MicroPower won the 18th annual Tech America San Diego 2011 award in the "communications technology" category.
