= Rasta Taco =

American restaurant and catering company

- Type: Private
- Industry: Restaurants- Fast Casual
- Founded: Orange County, California (2006)
- Founder: Mario Melendez
- Headquarters: U.S.
- Area served: Southern California
- Products: Rasta Rita Margarita Trucks, Rasta Taco Cantina & Event Venue, Rasta Taco Carts, Rasta Taco Food Trucks, Rasta Taco Restaurant,
- Services: Event Venue, Food Truck Catering, Margarita Truck Catering, Taco Cart Catering, Restaurant Venue
- Website: www.rastataco.com

Rasta Taco is a restaurant and taco catering company known for its fusion of Mexican and Jamaican cuisines. Founded in 2006 by Mario "Maji" Melendez, the brand has grown from a single taco cart to concepts such as the Rasta Rita Margarita Truck, catering and event venue services.

== History ==
Rasta Taco was established in 2006 when Mario Melendez, inspired by a trip to Negril, Jamaica, noticed the absence of tacos among local food offerings. That afternoon, Melendez wrote a business plan on the back of a cocktail napkin. Upon returning to the United States, he launched a website to promote a mobile taco catering concept focused on Mexican and Jamaican fusion. The business received its first booking within minutes of the website going live, even before a taco cart was physically available.

Melendez quickly sourced a taco fabricator from Tijuana, Mexico. A month later, the taco cart rolled into business and in a few months Rasta Taco had expanded to more than 10 carts, catering up to 15 events per day with its Mexican and Jamaican fusion menu.

In 2007, the company introduced Rasta Rita, a bartending service specializing in margaritas, which later evolved into the Rasta Rita Margarita Truck in 2009. The truck became one of the first licensed mobile margarita bars in the United States, later expanding into a fleet.

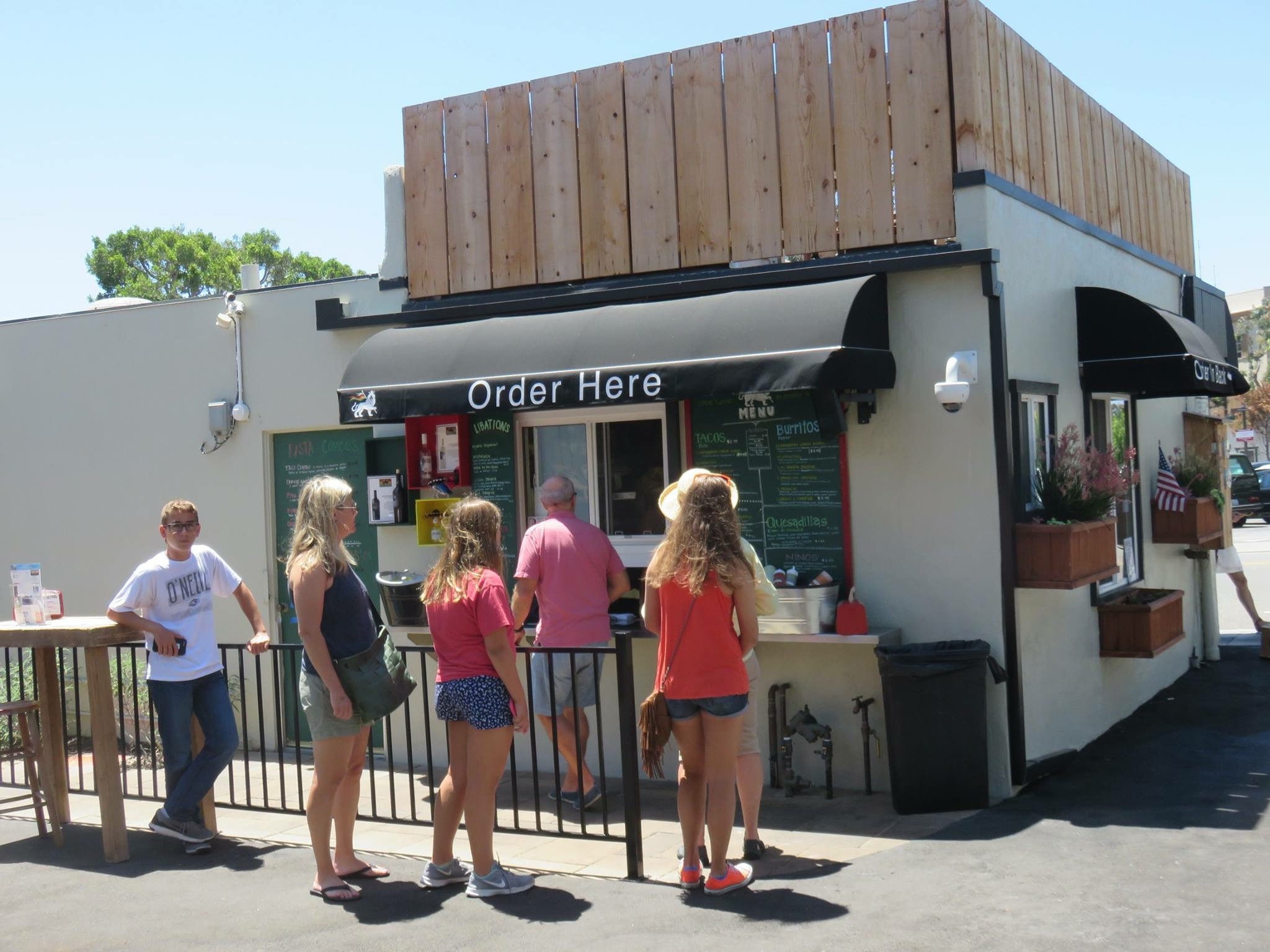
Rasta Taco Laguna Beach

In 2014, Rasta Taco opened its first brick-and-mortar location in Laguna Beach, California. The smallest restaurant in the state of California, the 220-square-foot Reggae-rasta themed restaurant quickly gained popularity with its signature dishes, including Jamaican Jerk Chicken Tacos.

In 2017, Melendez negotiated with Chris Blackwell, the founder of Island Records and producer behind Bob Marley & The Wailers, for a Rasta Taco space in Blackwell's Island Village project. From 2017 to 2020, Rasta Taco operated by the cruise port terminal in Ocho Rios, Jamaica, marking the first taco shop on the island and the first international location for the company. The location closed due to COVID-19-related restrictions.

In 2021, the Rasta Rita Cantina and Venue opened in Twentynine Palms, California, near Joshua Tree National Park. Renovated from a former military supply building for the U.S. Marine Corps, the venue now accommodates up to 275 guests for events.

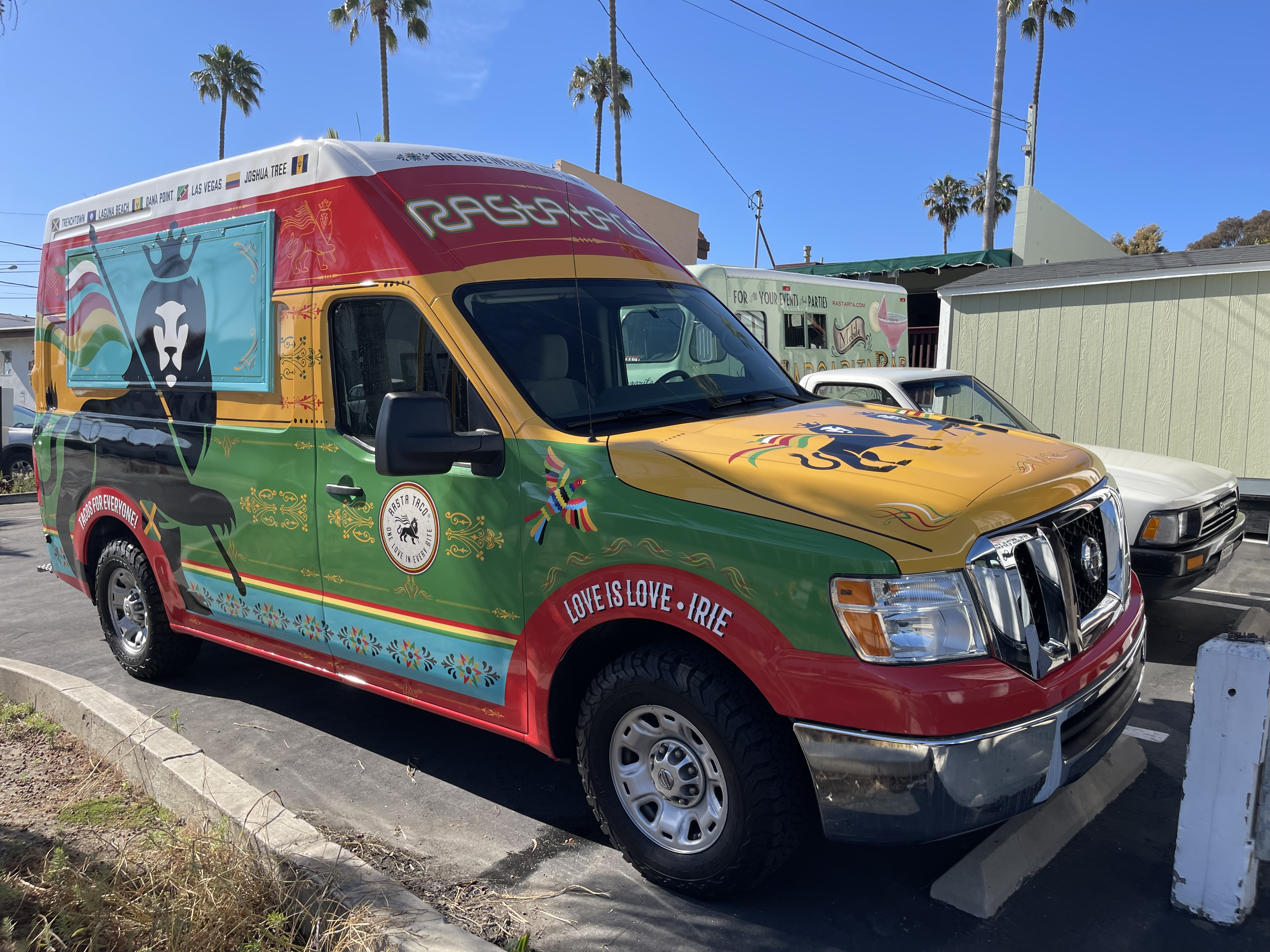
Rasta Taco Food Truck

In 2022, the company expanded its catering capabilities with a fleet of Rasta Rita Taco Food Trucks. Rasta Taco has since provided catering services for nearly 7,000 events across California.

Rasta Taco headquarters in San Clemente, California. Its holding company, JAH Rasta Holding, Inc., is located in Laguna Beach, California.

== Culinary Offerings ==
Rasta Taco's menu features a blend of Mexican and Jamaican flavors with homage to popular Reggae musicians. Popular items include:

- Jamaican Jerk Chicken Tacos
- Caribbean Carne Asada Burrito
- Reggae Wraps
- One Love Vegan Burrito
- Reggae Bowls
- Eek-a-Mouse Quesadillas
- Pato Banton Potato Taco

Breakfast burritos and a kids' menu are also available. A selection of alcoholic beverages includes beer, wine and cocktails such as the Rasta Rita margarita and "Bloody Marley."

== First Margarita Trucks ==
The Rasta Rita Margarita Truck, launched in 2009, was the first mobile margarita bar in the United States. The original truck was a refurbished 1965 GM coffee truck purchased online for $1,000. After months of restoration, Melendez posted a new website and the first booking occurred in hours.

The truck began serving custom, organic alcoholic and non-alcoholic beverages and has since grown into a fleet of refurbished vintage food trucks that are dispatched throughout California and surrounding states.

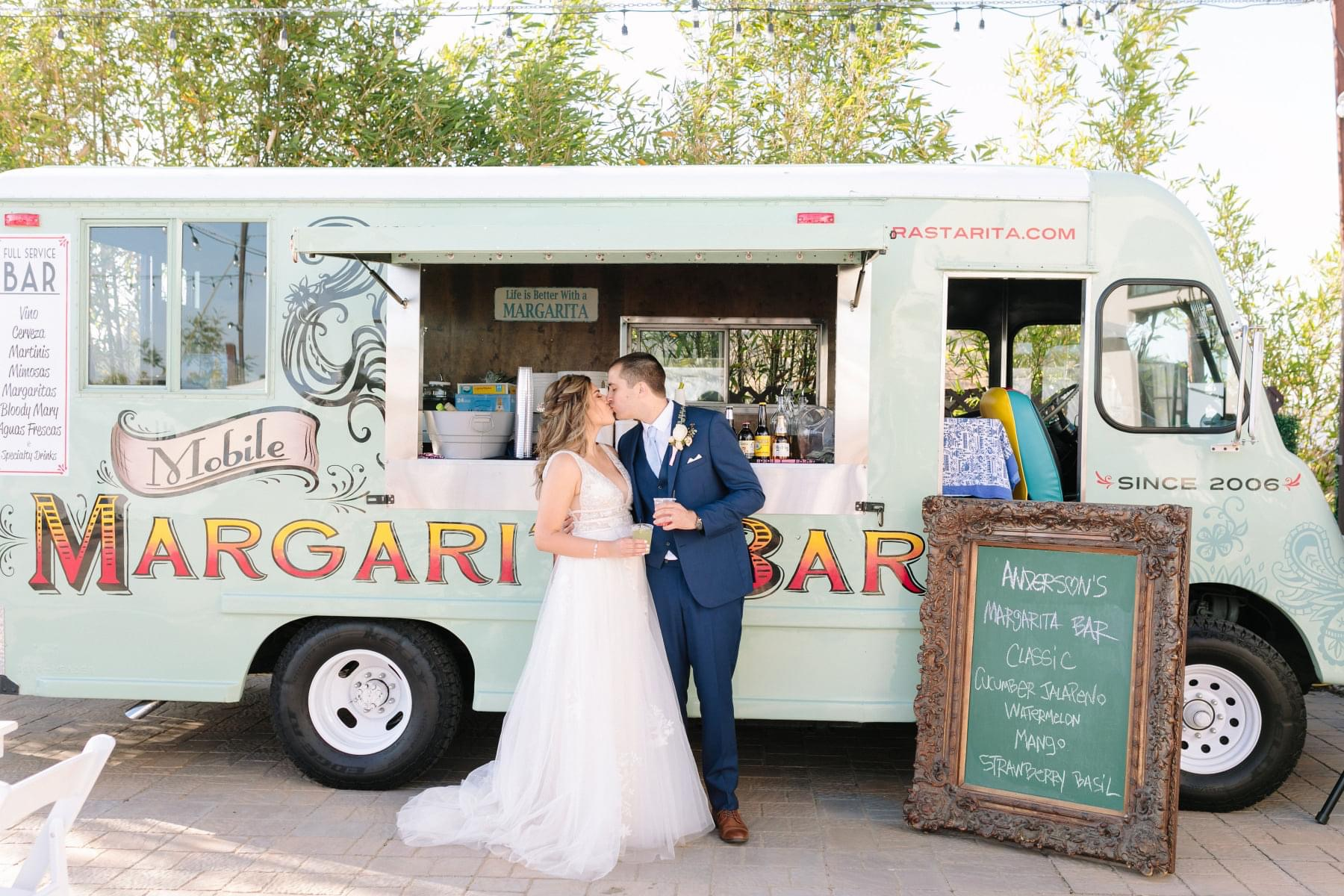
Rasta Rita Beverage Catering

Collectively, the trucks have served more than 500,000 margaritas, including 15,000 at a single event. The trucks have been liked, followed and shared more than 10 million times on social media.

In 2017, the company introduced Margarita Lady. This mobile bar operates from a restored vintage 1973 Balboa RV.

== Rasta Rita Cantina & Venue ==
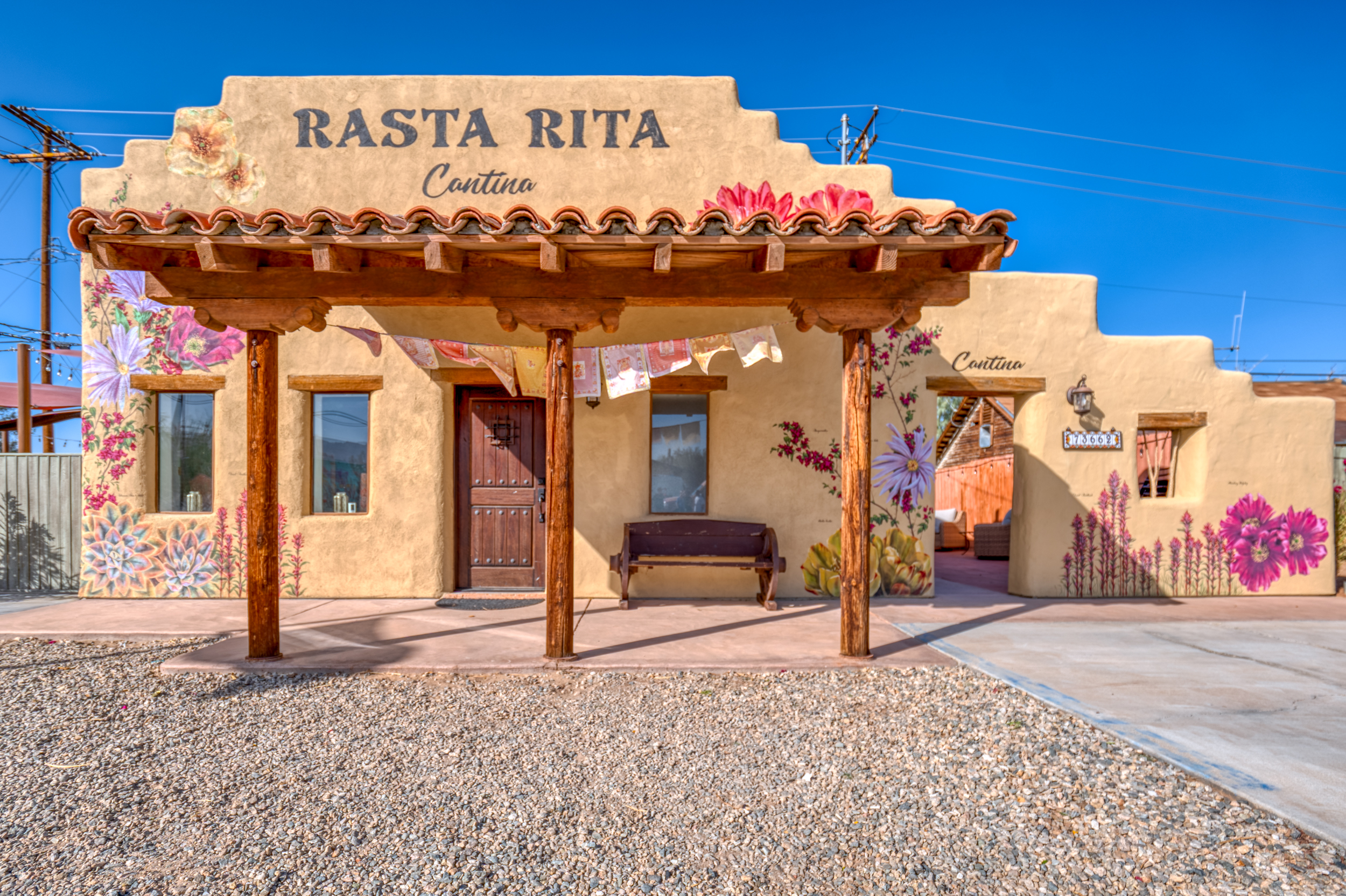
Rasta Rita Cantina & Venue

Opened in 2021 in Twentynine Palms, California, the Rasta Rita Cantina and Venue operates in an historic building once used as a U.S. Marine Corps supply station.

Keeping storied elements in place in honor of the U.S Marines, Melendez created a Juliette balcony from the previous loading dock, evolved the Marines' commissary into a catering kitchen, and created an outside dance floor where the Marines once ate meals.

The venue is a City-approved location for large public gatherings consisting of more than 250 people.

== Community Involvement ==
Rasta Taco engages in community outreach through donations and partnerships with local organizations, including schools, nonprofit groups, and law enforcement initiatives. The company contributes to events organized by the Orange County Sheriff's Department and participates in charity golf tournaments.
