= Miro Technologies =

Miro Technologies, Inc.
- Company type: Privately Held
- Industry: Aerospace / Defense and Commercial MRO software
- Founded: 1981
- Headquarters: La Jolla, CA; Yeovil, Somerset, United States; UK
- Products: GOLDesp (Enterprise Service Platform), AuRA, WRAM Online (Work Recording & Asset Management)
- Website: www.mirotechnologies.com

Miro Technologies, Inc. was a privately held company headquartered in La Jolla, California that developed and supplied ground-based Maintenance, Repair and Overhaul (MRO) and supply management software to the Aerospace / Defense (A&D) and commercial MRO sectors.

Miro initially provided an aftermarket logistics application called GOLD to the A&D market in the USA starting in 1981, and subsequently expanded their product line and customer base to serve both A&D and commercial MRO customers in Europe, India, Asia and South America. Miro’s technology has been deployed in combat by the UK Ministry of Defence in both Iraq and Afghanistan over the last decade.

On 25 October 2012, Boeing acquired Miro Technologies. Miro became part of the Global Services & Support business that falls under Boeing Defense, Space & Security, which is a unit of The Boeing Co.

In March 2016, Miro Technologies was merged with its sister company, Tapestry Solutions in San Diego CA, and no longer exists as a separate organization.

== Products ==
- GOLD: Integrated Maintenance & Supply management software designed for Aerospace / Defense market.
- GOLDesp: Java EE compliant ‘Enterprise Service Platform’ based on the functionality of original GOLD application.
- AuRA: Integrated Maintenance & Supply management software designed for commercial MRO market.
