= Nationwide Airlines =

Nationwide Airlines may refer to the following airlines:

- Nationwide Airlines (South Africa), 1991–2008
- Air South (Georgia), founded in 1969 as Nationwide Airlines Southeast
