= Four Twenty Bank =

Cannabis dispensary and lounge in Palm Springs, California, U.S.

Coordinates: 33.8197°N 116.5468°W

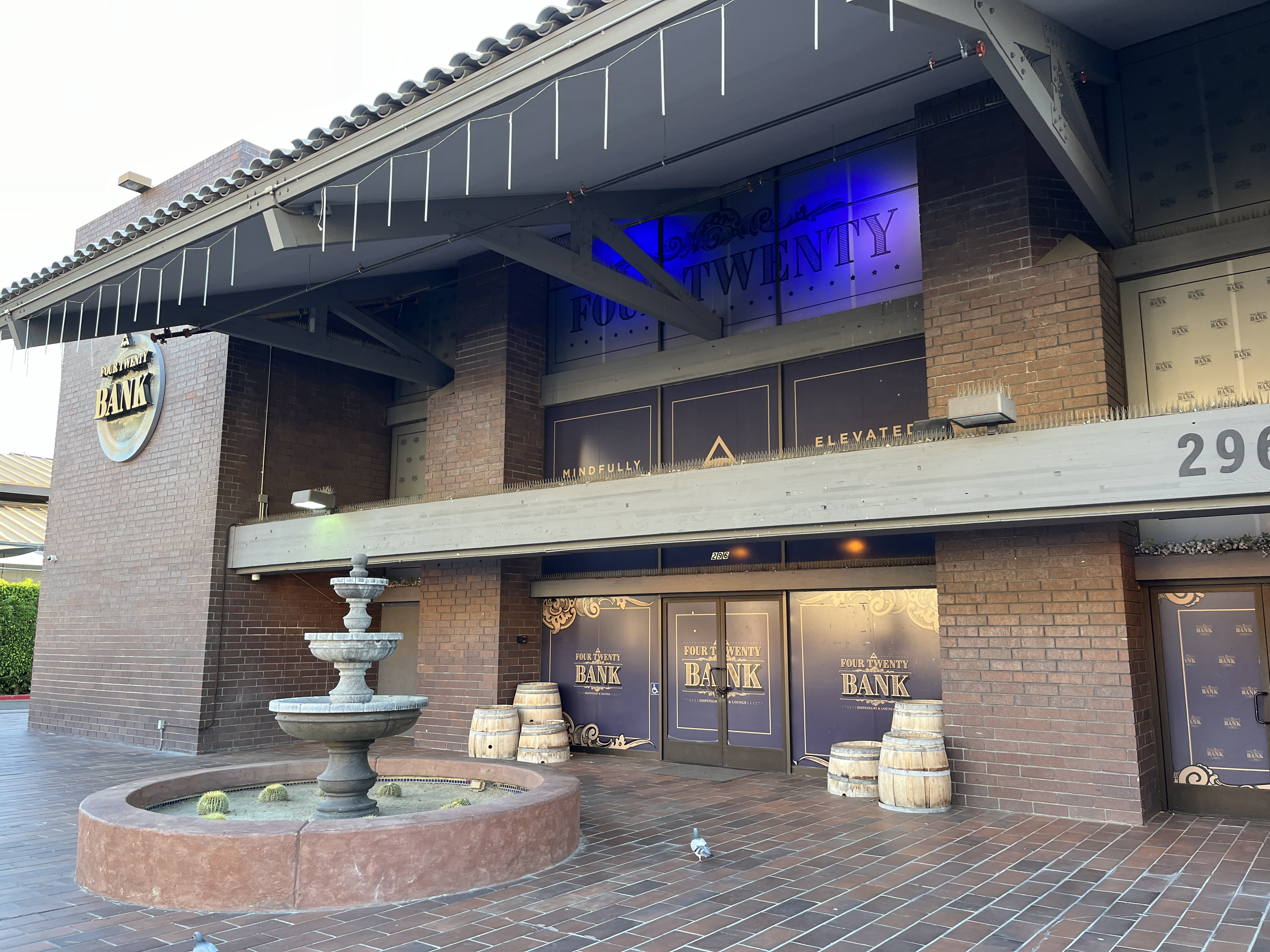
- The lounge's exterior, 2024
- Industry: Cannabis
- Founded: 2021; 5 years ago
- Headquarters: Palm Springs, California, United States
- Owners: Julie Montante; Nolan Moore
- Website: fourtwentybank.com

Four Twenty Bank is a cannabis dispensary and lounge in Palm Springs, California, United States.

== Description and history ==
The cannabis dispensary and lounge Four Twenty Bank operates in downtown Palm Springs. The business bills itself as the "world's largest consumption lounge". It opened in 2021, in a two-story building that previously operated as a First Interstate Bank branch.

The interior features air hockey, billiard tables, couches and other seating, Jenga, pinball, vending machines, and video games such as Ms. Pac-Man. Julie Montante and Nolan Moore are co-owners.

== See also ==
- 420 (cannabis culture)
- Cannabis in California
