= Jimboy's Tacos =

American Mexican fast food restaurant chain

- Type: Private
- Industry: Restaurants
- Genre: Fast food restaurant
- Founded: 1954; 72 years ago Kings Beach, California
- Headquarters: Folsom, California, United States
- Number of locations: 40 plus (2022)
- Area served: United States
- Website: jimboystacos.com

Jimboy's Tacos is a fast food restaurant chain and franchise, serving Mexican-American cuisine.

The company was founded in 1954 by Jim and Margaret Knudsen, and is headquartered in Folsom, California.

Its signature dish is a Parmesan dusted taco filled with ground beef, cheese and lettuce. In 2022, the company had over 40 locations in California, Nevada and Texas.

== Concept ==
The restaurant bills its signature dish as "The Original American Taco", and a company spokesperson said, "We don’t consider ourselves authentic Mexican food".

== Menu ==
The restaurant's signature dish is its Parmesan dusted taco, filled with ground beef, cheese and shredded lettuce.

Other taco fillings include pork carnitas and a halved hamburger patty, called a taco burger. Ingredients of the taco burger include "diced tomatoes, lettuce, pickles, shredded cheese — and a 'special sauce' that tasted like extra-tangy mayonnaise.

Many Mexican restaurants in the Kansas City area also serve parmesan tacos, and it appears that the dish was developed independently in both locations.

The restaurant also serves burritos with charred exteriors. Most locations also serve craft beers.

== History ==
In 1949, Jim and Margaret Knudson visited a friend's home for dinner. They were served tacos for the first time, and having experience in the food business, Jim thought the taco would have universal appeal, and so he developed his own taco recipe. He added his recipe to the menu of his restaurant "Jimmy's 49er Cafe" located in Grass Valley, California. In the first few years, customers were not enthusiastic about trying the menu item, but it gradually gained popularity.

In 1954, the two converted a 16-foot trailer into a mobile kitchen. A frequent customer gave Jim the nickname, "Jimboy". This inspired the two to rename the restaurant, "Jimboy's Spanish Tacos". Around the summer of 1954, the couple towed the recently converted trailer to Kings Beach, California on the north shore of Lake Tahoe. The fledgling restaurant soon became popular with celebrities like the cast of the Bonanza TV series that filmed nearby and members of the Rat Pack who were performing at casinos in the area.
