= Carbon Lighthouse =

American clean technology company

Carbon Lighthouse is an American clean technology and property technology company that works to reduce carbon emissions. The organization is headquartered in San Francisco.

== Mission ==
Carbon Lighthouse was created to use market forces to stop climate change. Carbon Lighthouse's data-driven approach has led it to be known as “The Ghostbusters of Energy Efficiency."

== History ==
Carbon Lighthouse was founded in 2009 by Brenden Millstein (CEO) and Raphael Rosen (President). The organization began with energy projects in California and Oregon and through the support of various social innovation competitions including the Echoing Green Fellowship, the Stanford StartX Fellowship, the Stanford Social Innovation Fellowship, and others. On March 13, 2018, chief executive officer Brenden Millstein announced they had raised $27 Million from various sources to expand its engineering and marketing efforts.

== Business approach ==
Carbon Lighthouse's business approach was designed to minimize the cost and time required to reduce energy consumption in commercial & industrial buildings. The organization does not focus on energy studies or capital-intensive retrofits but earns income by delivering energy savings, primarily through the optimization of existing equipment already installed in buildings. Carbon Lighthouse engineers collect and analyze large amounts of data. The firm takes an entire building approach.
