= PANTA =

PANTA Systems
- PANTA Systems logo
- Company type: Private
- Industry: Computer hardware and data warehousing
- Founded: 2002
- Defunct: 2007
- Headquarters: Santa Clara, California, United States
- Products: Data warehouse appliance
- Website: No longer available

PANTA Systems was founded in 2002 and headquartered in Santa Clara, California with offices in Austin, Texas and Pune. PANTA manufactured and sold Data Warehouse Appliances until 2007. The PANTA appliances ran the Oracle 10g database engine on servers and storage manufactured by PANTA and clustered together with an InfiniBand fabric.

PANTA Systems was a foundation member of the Oracle Information Appliance Initiative, since renamed the Oracle Optimized Warehouse Initiative (OWI). As of 2008, OWI members included Dell/EMC, HP, IBM, SGI and Sun.

PANTA Systems is the only data warehouse appliance vendor to validate their claims of high perform, high availability and low cost with an externally verified world record.

== See also ==
- Business intelligence
- Data mining
- Data marts
- Data warehouse appliance
