= Iron Grip Barbell Company =

American exercise equipment manufacturer

- Industry: Fitness
- Founded: 1993
- Founder: Michael Rojas and Scott Frasco
- Headquarters: Santa Ana, California, USA
- Products: Commercial free weight equipment
- Website: www.irongrip.com

The Iron Grip Barbell Company is an American manufacturer of commercial free weight equipment based in Santa Ana, California.

== History ==
Founded in 1993, its website claims it is the only company that still manufactures a complete line of equipment in the United States.

Iron Grip holds many patents, and is internationally known.
