= ConSentry Networks =

- Founder: Jeff Prince

ConSentry Networks was an American computer networking hardware company. It sold intelligent switching products, providing user and application control for enterprises. ConSentry access layer LAN switches understand the username, device, role, application at Layer 7, and destination for each flow and apply policy dynamically. The company's patented multi-core CPU hardware enables this intelligent switching at up to 10 Gbit/s throughput.

Jeff Prince, who co-founded Foundry Networks, was a co-founder of ConSentry. ConSentry was headquartered in Milpitas, CA and had offices throughout the world.

ConSentry Networks went out of business on August 20, 2009.

== See also ==
- Network access control
