= Lakeside Herbal Solutions =

Cannabis dispensary in Clearlake, California

- Company type: Cannabis dispensary
- Industry: Cannabis
- Headquarters: 4345 Mullen Avenue, Clearlake, California, United States
- Owner: Chris Jennings
- Website: www.lakesideherbal.com

Lakeside Herbal Solutions is a cannabis dispensary located on Mullen Avenue in Clearlake, California.

== Description ==
Lakeside Herbal Solutions, owned by Chris Jennings, is one of three cannabis dispensaries located in Clearlake, California. Lakeside Herbal Solutions sources its cannabis from Jennings' own South Lake Farms, for which he reportedly spent tens of thousands of dollars and hired a handful of consultants to meet California's environmental impact requirements for cannabis applications. In August 2018, it was reported that, due to California's then-new packaging and testing regulations that took effect on July 1 of that year, the price of an eighth of an ounce of flower rose from $35 to $62.
