= OneRoof Energy =

OneRoof Energy, Inc.
- Company type: Public company
- Traded as: TSX Venture Exchange: ON
- Founded: 2011
- Headquarters: San Diego
- Key people: David Field, CEO; Dan Halvorson, CFO
- Website: http://www.oneroofenergy.com/

OneRoof Energy was an American solar energy financing company that provided leasing options for homeowners seeking to have photovoltaic solar panels installed. OneRoof energy was a public company that traded on the TSX Venture Exchange under the symbol ON between 2011 and 2020. The company began to wind down operations in 2017 as it sold its portfolio to Greenbacker Residential Solar LLC for $8 million in cash.

At one point, OneRoof Energy had offices in five states, including its headquarters in San Diego, California, and offices in Phoenix, Arizona, Honolulu, Hawaii, Newton, Massachusetts, and Lake Success, New York.

== History ==
OneRoof Energy was a California-based startup that was founded in 2011 and went public in December 2012. In February 2013, OneRoof Energy announced the creation of a $100 million fund backed by Morgan Stanley to assist in the company's rooftop solar panel financing operation.

According to the reports in December 2016, OneRoof Energy announced that it would be winding down its operations.

== Business Offerings ==
=== Residential Solar Leasing ===
OneRoof Energy partnered with traditional energy retailers to offer customers a menu of solar energy system leasing options through its SolarSelect program. They had partnered with Frys Electronics.

=== SunOpps ===
SunOpps was an online portal from OneRoof Energy designed to allow users to customize financing options, track installation progress, and monitor performance of their solar system for increased energy efficiency.
