= Winchell's Donuts =

American doughnut shop chain, founded 1948

Winchell's Donut House, Inc.

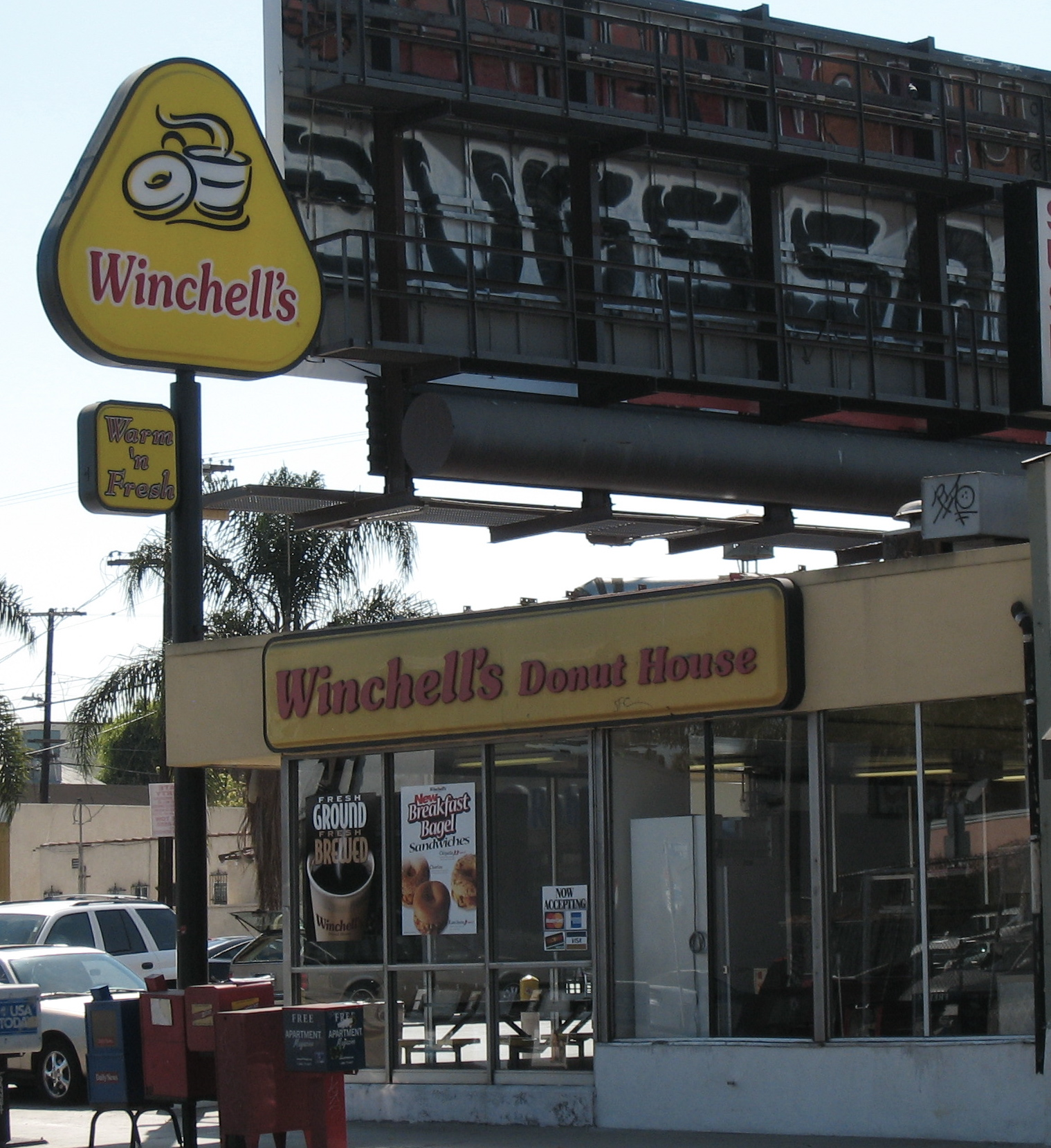
- Winchell's Donut House in Los Angeles
- Type: Subsidiary
- Industry: Coffeehouse
- Genre: Fast casual; Bakery
- Founded: October 18, 1948; 78 years ago in Temple City, California, U.S.
- Founder: Verne Winchell
- Headquarters: Industry, California, U.S.
- Number of locations: 170 (of which 100 in United States)
- Area served: United States, Guam, Saipan
- Key people: Bob Zanolli (President)
- Products: Doughnuts; Coffee; Sandwiches; Tea; Baked goods; Breakfast
- Parent: Denny's (1972–2004); Yum Yum Donut Shops, Inc. (2004–present)
- Website: winchells.com

Winchell's Donut House is an international doughnut company and coffeehouse chain founded by Verne Winchell in 1948, in Temple City, California. In 1999, when the company was owned by Canadian company Shato Holdings, there were 293 Winchell's locations in the Western United States; by 2004, when it was bought by competing chain Yum Yum Donut Shops, Inc., the chain had been reduced to nearly 200 locations; by 2025, this had been further reduced to Winchell's 100 locations in six states, plus locations in Guam and Saipan. In the past, there have also been franchise locations in Japan, Korea, New Zealand and Saudi Arabia, though information on these operations needs to be updated as of October 2025.

== History ==
Vintage sign and logo styling

Verne Winchell founded the company on October 8, 1948, in Temple City, California.

In 1999, then owned by Canadian company Shato Holdings, there were 293 Winchell's locations in the United States. That same year, in response to the arrival of Krispy Kreme donut franchises in Southern California, Winchell's introduced the concept, and slogan, "Home of the Warm 'n Fresh Donut", in addition to its existing offer of a 14-doughnut dozen, as opposed to the standard baker's dozen of 13.

In 2004, Winchell's had been reduced to just under 200 locations in the United States when it was purchased by Yum-Yum Donuts, a company which operates donut shops under its own name; the purchased operations continued to operate under the Winchell's name.

From 2002 to 2008, Winchell's closed its shops in Portland, Oregon and they were replaced by "Heavenly Donuts".

In 2005, it withdrew from the Kansas City, Missouri area.

While Winchell's was headquartered in Santa Ana, California at the time of its 2004 sale to Yum Yum, by 2022 it was co-headquartered at the Yum Yum head office in the City of Industry, California. As of October 2025, the chain operates 170 locations, in the United States, Guam and Saipan, of which 100 locations are in the United States: 74 in California, 12 in Colorado, 9 in Nevada, 3 in Nebraska, and one each in Kansas and Oklahoma.

== See also ==
- List of doughnut shops
