= Cramer's Bakery =

Bakery in San Diego, California, United States

- Formerly: Liberty Bakery
- Company type: Bakery
- Founded: 1891 in San Diego, California
- Founders: George Cramer; Bertha Cramer
- Defunct: 1943
- Fate: merged with IBC
- Area served: San Diego County, CA; Imperial County, CA; Yuma County, AZ
- Products: Butter Cream Bread

Cramer's Bakery was founded in 1891 by George and Bertha Cramer in San Diego. For 52 years, the business delivered bread to residences and businesses in San Diego County, Imperial County, CA and Yuma County, AZ. During that time, Cramer's Bakery became famous in the area for their Butter Cream Bread. The bakery merged with Interstate Baking Company (IBC - eventually Hostess Brands Inc) and sold to the Long Beach-based Weber-Millbrook Bakery Division of IBC in 1943.

== History ==
George Cramer settled in San Diego at the height of the land boom in 1886. After the real estate slump, the couple began baking bread out of their home at 1955 Julian Ave in San Diego. For the first decade, the bakery was known by the name of Liberty Bakery, but was changed to Cramer's Bakery. It was the first bakery in San Diego to deliver bread by automobile only. In 1926, the business was reorganized and sons Henry and Herman Cramer became president and assistant manager of the Bakery. In 1927 an addition was added to the bakery including installing an electric traveling oven with capacity of 1200 lbs per hour. In 1929 Cramer's Bakery opened an additional plant in El Centro California to support the Imperial Valley and Yuma business. In 1931, for the celebration of the 40th anniversary, it was noted in the San Diego Union that more than 225,000 slices of Butter Cream Bread were consumed in San Diego country every day of the week.

In 2006, Weber/IBC/Hostess vacated the bakery at 1955 Julian Ave in San Diego. In 2012, the building and equipment was purchased and will become a mixed use facility that will include residential and artist spaces, known as Bread & Salt.
