= Flipora =

Web content recommendation service

- Flipora product logo
- Founded: 13 June 2012
- Headquarters: Sunnyvale, United States
- Website: flipora.com

Flipora was a personalized content recommendation service that recommended web content to users based on their interests and web activity. Flipora's machine learning algorithm automatically categorized the web into thousands of interest categories and provides content to users that suits their identified interests. Users could also follow topics and other like-minded users to receive content recommendations that are further personalized. Flipora users could upvote content recommendations they enjoy and automatically promote those content recommendations to their followers. Flipora had amassed 8 million users by June 2012 and crossed 25 million users worldwide in April 2014.

Flipora also had a content recommendation iPhone app. The app allowed a user to connect their Facebook and Twitter accounts. The app then used machine learning to infer a user's interests based on their Facebook and Twitter activity along with the activity within the app. Finally, the app made recommendations to users based on topics deemed to be within their sphere of interest.
