= Avive =

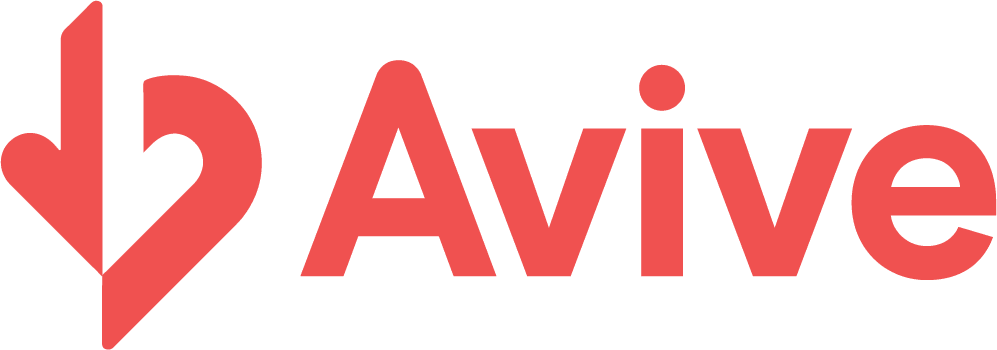
- Company type: Private
- Industry: Automated external defibrillator
- Founded: 2017
- Founders: Rory Beyer; Moseley Andrews
- Headquarters: Brisbane, California, United States
- Key people: Sameer Jafri (CEO)
- Website: avive.life

Avive is an American developer and manufacturer of automated external defibrillator and connected emergency response software for cardiac arrest emergencies. Based in Brisbane, California, it is known for developing Avive AED and 4 Minute Community program.

== History ==
Avive was founded in 2017 by Rory Beyer and Moseley Andrews as Revive to develop a next-generation AED aimed at increasing survival rates from sudden cardiac arrest (SCA). Beyer and Andrews developed an initial AED concept while studying at the Massachusetts Institute of Technology (MIT). During the development phase, Beyer met Sameer Jafri, founder and president of the Saving Hearts Foundation, a nonprofit focused on SCA prevention, who later joined the company.

In December 2018, the company completed a $3.4 million seed financing round led by Greenbox Venture Partners. In June 2020, Avive raised an additional $7 million in funding with participation from the Laerdal Million Lives Fund, IrishAngels, and ResMed. In March 2022, Avive raised $22 million in Series A funding co-led by Questa Capital, Catalyst Health Ventures, and Laerdal Million Lives Fund.

In October 2022, the Avive AED received approval from the Food and Drug Administration (FDA).

== 4 Minute Community program ==
Avive operates the 4 Minute Community program (originally launched as the 4-Minute City program), which deploys networks of Avive Connect AEDs throughout communities based on historical sudden cardiac arrest data. The program makes Avive AED accessible within 4 minutes of a cardiac arrest incident.

In 2021, Avive announced the city of Jackson, Tennessee as the first 4 Minute City Program partner, in collaboration with Friends of Heart, The City of Jackson Fire Department, West Tennessee Healthcare, and others. Two years later in the summer of 2023, Avive launched the first 4 Minute Cities in Jackson, Tennessee; Forsyth County, Georgia; and Cumberland County, Pennsylvania.

== Device ==
The first iteration of Avive's automated external defibrillator (AED) was developed by Massachusetts Institute of Technology (MIT) students Rory Beyer, Moseley Andrews, and Priscilla Agosto in 2017 as a part of a senior capstone design course at the university. Their initial project was a defibrillator fully powered by a smartphone. Beyer and Andrews further developed electronic circuits capable of delivering sufficient power from a rechargeable battery, the size of a cell phone. Their work led to the production of the Avive Connect AED, a defibrillator weighing slightly over two pounds. The device was designed with assistance from San Francisco-based industrial design firm, NewDealDesign.

== Awards and recognition ==
In August 2023, the Avive Connect AED won two International Design Excellence Awards (IDEA) from the Industrial Designers Society of America (IDSA) in the service design and medical and health categories.
