= Patterson & Francis Aviation Company =

American aircraft manufacturer

- Industry: Aircraft manufacturer and maintenance
- Predecessor: Patterson Aeroplane Company
- Headquarters: San Francisco, California
- Key people: C.H. Patterson, John Thompson Patterson, Roy Newell Francis

Patterson & Francis Aviation Company was an American aircraft manufacturer and repair service in the earliest days of powered flight. The company started as the Patterson Aeroplane Company, based in San Francisco, California.

In 1912, Chas H. Patterson built and tested his own aircraft based on a Nieuport design. Later aircraft included twin tractor designs from his future partners, Roy Francis and Frank Bryant. Shortly afterward, production moved to 1410 Howard Street.

Patterson built Nieuport style aircraft and custom parts for early aviators such as Fritz Schiller and E.F. De Villa. The company also built aircraft to compete for the Gordon Bennett Trophy. Allan Haines Loughead, co-founder of Lockheed, contracted Patterson for a float to be used on the first Loughead aircraft, the ALCO model G.

In 1913, the company produced a twin-propeller flying boat that competed in the 1913 Great Lakes Reliability Trophy. Competing against Glenn L. Martin, Francis earned 6722 points flying a route around the Great Lakes. The aircraft developed mechanical difficulties around Pentwater, leaving Francis with a twelve-hour train ride to get parts to continue.

The historical papers of the company are now held by the Burton Historical Collection of the Detroit Public Library.

== Aircraft ==
Aircraft built
| Model name | First flight | Number built | Type |
|---|---|---|---|
| 1912 Patterson Twin | 1912 | 2 | Pusher biplane |
| 1913 Patterson Twin Seaplane | 1913 | 1 | Seaplane |
| 1913 Patterson Twin Tractor | 1913 | 1 | Dual-prop single-engine tractor |
