= Newlight Technologies =

- Industry: Climate technology, carbon sequestration
- Founded: 2003 in California, United States of America
- Founders: Mark Herrema, Kenton Kimmel
- Headquarters: 14382 Astronautics Dr, Huntington Beach, CA 92647, USA
- Key people: Mark Herrema, CEO; Kenton Kimmel, CTO
- Website: newlight.com

Newlight Technologies is a company based in Huntington Beach, California, known for carbon sequestration into materials and products. The company is headquartered and manufactures in Huntington Beach, CA, and staffs over 200 employees.

== History and corporate affairs ==
As of October 2020, Newlight Technologies has one facility located in Huntington Beach, California, which serves as its headquarters, R&D, operations, and manufacturing facility.

== Technology ==
Currently, Newlight captures methane from a dairy farm in California. The methane is transported to a bioreactor. From there, the methane is mixed with air and interacts with enzymes to form a polymer trademarked as Aircarbon. According to Popular Science, the material performs similarly to most oil-based plastics but costs less to produce. Aircarbon has already been contracted for use in desk chairs, computer packaging, and smart phone cases. Newlight Technologies has also commercialized its own lines of carbon-negative eyewear and foodware, formerly known as Covalent and Restore.

== Recognition ==
In 2014, AirCarbon was named Popular Science's Innovation of the Year, and in 2016, Aircarbon was awarded the Presidential Green Chemistry Challenge Award by the U.S. EPA.
