= Access Books =

California non-profit organization

- Formation: 1999
- Founder: Rebecca Constantino
- Legal status: Non-profit organization
- Headquarters: Los Angeles

Access Books is a nonprofit volunteer organization that gives books to disadvantaged children's libraries in Southern California. These are primarily public and charter school libraries in the inner city, where over 90% of the population lives in poverty and books are generally scarce. As one study showed, children in Beverly Hills have ready access to as many as 400 times more books than children living in the Compton and Watts areas of South Los Angeles. Underfunded libraries also tend to be in worse physical condition and less user-friendly than their affluent counterparts.

== History ==
Rebecca Constantino founded Access Books in 1999 while doing graduate research on the roles of school and community libraries in Los Angeles. Working with a school in Brentwood, she discovered a plan to throw away hundreds of books to make way for new ones. She salvaged the rejected books and donated them to a public school in Compton. The library at this elementary school had been closed for so long that "the door was locked and no one knew where the keys had gone." This was the start of Access Books. As Constantino said, "If you take away poverty as a predictor, the state of the school library is the best indicator of literacy, reading achievement, success in school. I can't possibly take away poverty.... But I can do something about the libraries in our children's schools.”

So far, Access Books has given more than 2 million new and used books to over 325 libraries and community centers in Southern California. Primarily intended to encourage reading for pleasure, these books include popular fiction, early picture and chapter books, biographies, classics, and young adult novels. The emphasis on pleasure reading is intended to encourage children to become motivated readers, to help provide them with a foundation for all reading, including academic reading.

Access Books acquires new books via donations from publishers and distributors or buying them at a discount with grants from charities, businesses, or wealthy individuals. Recipient libraries may request specific titles that are of particular interest to their communities. Used books mostly come from individual donations and book drives by ad hoc groups or local organizations such as middle-class suburban and private schools. Access Books encourages partnerships between schools that have resources and those needing them, as with a book drive led by two students at Oaks Christian School, a private school in Westlake Village. This drive yielded over 11,000 books for new charter schools in North Hollywood and downtown L.A.

Access Books delivers and helps process the thousands of books that go to each library. At Saturday library events scheduled during the school year, volunteers from Access Books and the donating and receiving schools together sort, label, and shelve the books. This reduces overhead and speeds up the availability of the books for use. To further improve the libraries, volunteers also paint colorful literacy-themed murals and install items such as comfortable furniture and rugs for reading. The Saturday events expedite this work and facilitate contact between diverse communities.

Access Books fundraisers and community outreach events have included book signings with authors Jamie Lee Curtis, Cornelia Funke, and Jeff Kinney as well as conferences for young writers and illustrators. The conferences, held at venues such as the Milken Community High School and UCLA, have included keynote speakers and workshops led by professional writers.
