= Party America =

American party store chain

Party America is a chain of stores that sell supplies for parties such as balloons, party favors, cards, and seasonal items (e.g. fog machines for Halloween).

There are 144 total Party America stores (not counting Paper Warehouse, the party store chain Party America owns) and they are located in 46 states (counting Paper Warehouse stores). Party America is not located in Maine, New Mexico, Hawaii, or Alaska.

== History ==
Party America had 1,764 employees in 2005. For fiscal year 2015 its revenue was $160 million.

The Small Business Administration (SBA) lists Party America franchisees as eligible for "streamlined review" for SBA loans.

== Acquisition ==
In December 2005, Party America was acquired by Amscan along with Party City.

Party America was acquired by ABN AMRO in September 2006. Party America's CEO in 2005 was Marty Allen.

== See also ==
- Party City
