= Lovecraft Biofuels =

American company

- Industry: Engine fuel
- Founder: Brian Friedman
- Headquarters: Silverlake, California, United States
- Products: LoveCrafts (car conversion allowing diesel engines to operate on vegetable oil)

Lovecraft Biofuels was a Silverlake, California operation that proved typical diesel engines could run on vegetable oil using what is known as a "single tank" conversion.

== Company ==
It opened in early 2006 in Silver Lake. LoveCraft Biofuels was founded by Brian Friedman on Sunset Boulevard in Los Angeles. He invented a pump that pushes vegetable oil through diesel Mercedes engines. He began selling the converted vehicles for around USD$6000 to $8000 each. According to Friedman, the engines are quieter and burn cleaner than diesel engines. He was interviewed about the engines by NPR in 2006. By 2006, he had converted around 150 cars, with a waitlist. A conversion cost $700 and four hours to complete. By that summer, among clients were Mandy Moore.

On July 6, 2006, the City of Los Angeles gave Lovecraft a certificate of appreciate for efforts "to move Los Angeles forward". It was featured on the History Channel's show Modern Marvels in the episode "Renewable Energy Sources."

Governor Arnold Schwarzenegger was reportedly a customer, and brought in a Hummer to be modified. The road test team from Wired Magazine tested the conversion process in May 2007, on a 1983 Mercedes Benz.

The Los Angeles Times noted in August 2006 that vegetable oil had not been certified as a car fuel, and Friedman was working on a way to add some diesel to the car tanks, to effectively make a dirtier but legal fuel. Friedman stated "the cars aren't illegal because they're multi-fuel cars," and that while he was trying to comply with all laws, few addressed his type of operation.

In 2007, Tacee Webb took over the business from founder Brian Friedman, with Friedman to stay on as a consultant. Afterwards, a legal battle took place between the businesses' former and current owners. In February 2008, Friedman was barred from the business, or doing any business that might compete with the brand. By April 2008, the company sold conversion kits and conversions, not the cars themselves.

== Conversion cars ==
The company's car conversions can run on either diesel, filtered waste vegetable oil, new vegetable oil, or any combination thereof. Some versions do not heat the vegetable oil which may compromise filtering quality. With the success of converting diesel engines to using biofuels, home-made scam conversion kits of questionable quality were installed in old, inexpensive diesel cars and resold in more favorable alternative fuel markets.
