= Decillionix =

Defunct computer music hardware company

- Founded: 1983
- Defunct: 1987
- Headquarters: Sunnyvale, California
- Key people: Dan Retzinger
- Products: DX-1; Splash; Echo II; Synthestra; The Box

Decillionix was a company based in Sunnyvale, California which sold computer music hardware and software in the mid-1980s. Its first product was the DX-1 for the Apple II, sold in 1983. The DX-1 consisted of a monophonic 8-bit audio input card, a monophonic 8-bit audio output card, and the DX-1 Effects II software. Decillionix later produced MIDI software and hardware.

Decillionix was run by Dan Retzinger.

Decillionix ceased operations in 1987.

== Products ==
- Original DX-1 two-card sampler, and Effects II software for Apple II (1983)
- Single card version of the hardware for Apple II (1984)
- Splash, an audio visualization program for Apple II (1984)
- Echo II, an effects program for Apple II (1985)
- P-Drum, a percussion sequencing program for Apple II (1985)
- Synthestra, an hierarchical MIDI sequencing program for Apple II (1986)
- The Box, a standalone MIDI effects device (1986)

Splash, P-Drum, and Synthestra were written by David Van Brink who also wrote Tubeway.
