= BizLink Holding =

Taiwanese auto cable corporation

- Type: Public
- Traded as: TWSE: 3665
- Founded: 1996
- Founders: Roger Liang
- Key people: Roger Liang (chair); Felix Teng (CEO)
- Revenue: NT$71,247,272,000 (2025)
- Net income: NT$8,595,400 (2025)
- Number of employees: 22572 (2025)
- Website: bizlinktech.com

BizLink Holding Inc. is a company that produces cables, connectors, wire harnesses, and custom cable assemblies for automobiles and electronics. It was established in 1996 and headquartered in Fremont, California and employs more than 20,000 employees in more than 40 manufacturing sites.

== History ==
BizLink was established in 1996. Roger Liang is a co-founder and chair. Felix Teng is the chief executive officer. In 2020, the company acquired Singapore-based Speedy Industrial Supplies, adding manufacturing sites in Malaysia and Singapore. In 2021–2022, BizLink acquired Leoni AG for 451 million euros, adding an additional fifteen manufacturing sites in Europe and North America. BizLink had previously acquired Leoni's electrical appliance business in 2017.

BizLink announced plans to acquire the Slovak electrical equipment producer Easys in 2024. In 2025, BizLink opened a new manufacturing facility in Tainan in June. The company also acquired Switzerland-based Alpha Elektrotechnik AG and XFS Communications. In 2026, it acquired Blackstone Inc.'s Interplex unit.

=== Operations ===
BizLink is headquartered in Fremont, California. The company had over 40 manufacturing facilities as of 2025, including in China, Europe, Malaysia, Mexico, and Taiwan. In China, BizLink operated plants in Kunshan and Shenzhen in 2017.

=== Products ===
The company produces hardware such as electrical cables, connectors, and harnesses, which are used for automobiles, chipmaking equipment, consumer electronics, robotics, data centers, and other purposes. BizLink also designed products for computing and power cabinets to support high-speed connectivity and AI-ready data centers, according to DigiTimes.

== Finances ==
BizLink generated a revenue of NT$22.54 billion and a net profit of NT$1.83 billion (US$64 million) in 2020. The company generated $1.01 billion in revenue in 2021, representing a 33 percent increase from 2020. Net profit was $72.6 million, an increase of 17.5 percent. According to Nikkei Asia, 34 percent of revenue came from information technology equipment and data centers, 8 percent from home appliances, 19 percent from industrial equipment, and 17 percent from automotive applications. In 2022, BizLink reported a revenue of NT$53.66 billion, representing a 87.08 percent increase over 2021, as well as a total net profit of NT$4.4 billion.
