= Fwix =

- Company type: Private
- Website type: Consumer Web
- Available in: English
- Founded: Palo Alto, California
- Headquarters: San Francisco, California, {{{location_country}}}
- Area served: US, Canada, UK, Ireland, Australia, New Zealand
- Website: fwix.com
- Current status: Inactive

Fwix is a local information company for developers and media publishers. Fwix aggregates, in real-time, the news, events, status-updates, photos, reviews, places, and other social media in your city.

After a two years internship at Facebook, Daren Shirazi decided to found his own company Fwix in 2008.

== Pivot to Radius ==
In April 2012, the company announced it had rebranded the company as Radius Intelligence and changed its business model.

== See also ==
- Location-based service
