= Mark Zettl =

German footballer

Personal information
- Date of birth: 28 December 1998 (age 27)
- Place of birth: Munich, Germany
- Height: 1.71 m (5 ft 7 in)
- Position: Midfielder

Team information
- Current team: VfR Garching
- Number: 21

Youth career
- 2012–2017: SpVgg Unterhaching

Senior career*
| Years | Team | Apps | (Gls) |
| 2017–2018 | SpVgg Unterhaching | 1 | (0) |
| 2018– | VfR Garching | 26 | (2) |
- * Club domestic league appearances and goals as of 23 November 2019

Mark Zettl (born 28 December 1998) is a German footballer who plays as a midfielder for VfR Garching.
