= WebAssist =

American software company

WebAssist.com Corporation
- Type: Private
- Industry: Software
- Founded: Encinitas, California
- Founders: Ray Borduin (President); Hieu Bui; Neil Hansch; Matt Eastling; Tom Gade; Eric Ott; Tim Sweeney
- Headquarters: San Diego, California
- Area served: Worldwide
- Key people: Anna Robinson (VP of Operations); Michael Lekse
- Products: Dreamweaver Extensions; Pre-built Web Solutions
- Number of employees: 20 - 25 (October 2009)
- Website: http://www.webassist.com

WebAssist.com Corporation is a U.S. based software company that develops, licenses and supports a variety of web related software products for Adobe Dreamweaver. Headquartered in San Diego, California, the company’s core focus has been the creation of Dreamweaver extensions for web development.

While WebAssist primarily develops Dreamweaver extensions, the company has also built Microsoft Expression Web add-ons. In addition, WebAssist has offered custom software development services for Adobe Acrobat Connect Pro, Blackboard, and WebCT.

WebAssist is a privately held California C-corporation with approximately 20-25 employees. The company’s most prominent partners include Adobe, Microsoft, PayPal, AOL, eBay, Yahoo!, Google and Affinity.

== History ==
WebAssist was founded in the 1990s by Ray Borduin, Hieu Bui, Neil Hansch, Matt Eastling, Tom Gade, Eric Ott, and Tim Sweeney. Ray Borduin, WebAssist’s president, started as the sole employee building software extensions in his garage located in Carlsbad, California. The first product produced by Ray Borduin was called Line Maker, which was built for Elemental Software’s web development platform Drumbeat. Ray Borduin also produced a variety of eCommerce applications for Drumbeat, one of his core competencies leading up to the development of eCart a current product of WebAssist.

Soon after Elemental Software was acquired by Macromedia, Drumbeat was discontinued and Dreamweaver Ultradev was released. At this time Ray Borduin switched his focus to Dreamweaver, moved to an office in Solana Beach, California, and built the company’s first Dreamweaver extension named Cookies Toolkit. WebAssist has also been located in Encinitas, California, and San Diego, California, where the company is currently headquartered.
