= Aldila =

American golf equipment company

Aldila, Inc.
- Company type: Subsidiary
- Industry: Sporting Goods
- Genre: Golf
- Founder: Jim Flood
- Headquarters: Carlsbad, California, United States
- Products: Carbon Fiber products, including Golf club shafts and Archery Arrows
- Number of employees: over 1,400
- Parent: Mitsubishi Chemical Holdings Corp.
- Website: www.aldila.com

Aldila, Inc. is a sports equipment manufacturing company based in Carlsbad, California, United States. The company specializes in OEM and consumer golf club shafts, but also manufactures other carbon fiber products.

Aldila manufactures OEM shafts for many of the major golf club manufacturers including Callaway, TaylorMade and Ping, in addition to a range of Aldila branded consumer shafts. Production of shafts takes place outside of the United States, Vietnam, and China, while prepreg production occurs in Poway.

As the global economic downturn continued in late 2008, Aldila reduced its workforce in light of diminishing prospects for the golf industry going into 2009.

Aldilà is an Italian word meaning "the next life", "the after life", or "above and beyond" depending on the context in which it is used.

== Sponsored Tournaments ==
Aldila sponsors the Aldila Juniors at Oak Tree in the American Junior Golf Association.

== Advisory staff ==
Aldila has contracted the services of many professional golfers on an advisory basis. Players, past and present, who have worked with Aldila are listed below.

- (Australia) Stuart Appleby
- (United States) Boo Weekley
- (Zimbabwe) Nick Price
- (United States) Rich Beem
- (United States) Heath Slocum
- (United States) Paula Creamer
- (United States) Gary McCord
- (United States) Peter Kostis
