= Nationwide League =

Nationwide League may refer to:

- Nigeria Nationwide League, the third level of club football in Nigeria
- Nationwide Football League, English Football League
- Nationwide League (Kenya), replaced by FKF Division One
- Nationwide League (Kenya Rugby Union), a domestic Kenyan rugby union competition
