= BatchMaster Software =

- Industry: Enterprise resource planning
- Founded: 1983; 43 years ago
- Headquarters: 9861 Irvine Center Dr., Irvine, CA 92618
- Key people: Dr. Sahib Dudani, President & CEO; Ingrid Leon, Vice President; Sanjay Panjwani, Vice President Operations
- Number of employees: ~ 300
- Website: www.batchmaster.com

BatchMaster Software is a software company that develops enterprise resource planning (ERP) solution.

The company is headquartered in Laguna Hills, California, USA and has offices in New York, India, New Zealand and Mexico.

It is a Microsoft Gold Certified Partner and reseller of SAP Business One.

== History ==
BatchMaster was founded by Randy Peck as Pacific Micro Software Engineering and later changed the name to BatchMaster DOS. In 2000, the Company was acquired by eWorkplace Solutions and was reincorporated as BatchMaster Software. The company then started the project to come up with Windows based application software. In 2001, Infocus Solutions Pvt. Ltd. (ISPL) was formed in Indore, India to finish the project. ISPL started its operation with a team of seven people and within four years more than hundred people were working for the organization. The company formally announced its India operations in 2006 and changed the name to BatchMaster Software Pvt. Ltd.
