= AdGreetz =

American marketing services company

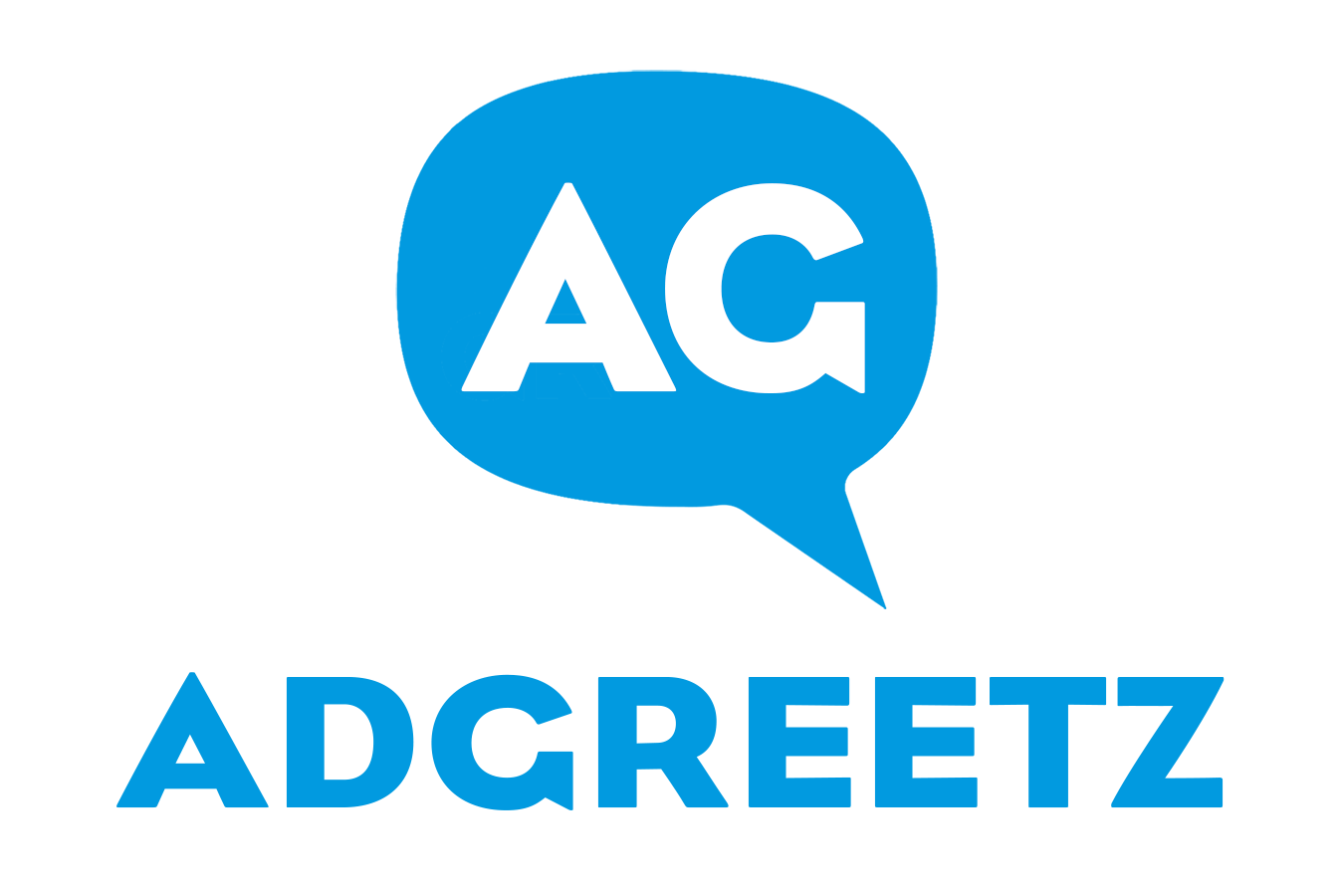
- Company type: Private
- Industry: Advertising, marketing
- Founded: 2009
- Headquarters: Los Angeles, CA, USA
- Key people: Eric Frankel, CEO
- Website: AdGreetz.com

AdGreetz is a marketing services company based in Los Angeles, California, United States. It was founded in 2009 by Eric Frankel, who serves as the company's CEO.

== Platform ==
The company uses adaptive video in its SaaS video personalization platform. Video messages are distributed through email, social media, websites, and banner ads.

AdGreetz has created videos for companies in various industries, including Flipkart and Forever 21. The campaigns are personalized to the ad viewers. The company also developed an email campaign for the film Fifty Shades of Grey, where recipients heard their name spoken through the voice of a character from the film. The company also created a campaign for the film Smurfs: The Lost Village.

In 2019, AdGreetz created the AdChef platform.
