= SpeakerCraft =

- Type: Private
- Founded: 1976
- Founder: Ed Haase; Ken Humphreys
- Headquarters: Petaluma, California
- Products: Loudspeakers, Home audio, Architectural speakers, Home cinema, Theater electronics, Theater control systems
- Website: www.speakercraft.com

SpeakerCraft is an American manufacturer of custom-installed audio/video and home theater products based in Petaluma, California. Founded in 1976 by Edward Haase, Ken Humphreys, and Eugene Humphreys, the company evolved from a retail stereo store and original equipment manufacturer to a designer and installer of custom audio systems. Over the years, SpeakerCraft has developed proprietary technologies such as AIM, TIME, WavePlane, and MODE, and has produced more than 1000 products, including architectural speakers, subwoofers, and control systems. The company has experienced significant growth and multiple ownership changes, including its sale to Nortek, Inc. in 2004. SpeakerCraft is recognized for its innovative approach and quality products, despite some criticism regarding cost.

== History ==
SpeakerCraft was founded in 1976 by Edward Haase, Ken Humphreys and Eugene Humphreys. Beginning as a retail stereo store and original equipment manufacturer of loudspeakers for companies such as Sonance, Niles Audio, Bang and Olufsen, JBL, Polk Audio, and many others, the company evolved into a designer and installer of custom audio systems. In 1988 Humphreys sold his interest to Jeff King, Sr. Jeff remained with the company until it ultimately sold in 2000 to Burkhardt, Management and Kinsman Capital. Jeff was a major force in both operations and development as well as defining the companies position for future growth. He was the primary decision maker that included hiring Jeremy Burkhardt in 1991 in the companies 16th year of business. Jeff Francisco managed the custom installation business and retail store where he studied product development and developed custom systems for the company.

In 1994, Ed Haase, Jeff King and Jeremy Burkhardt founded The SpeakerCraft Brand of architectural loudspeakers as a line of high-end custom speakers; they were set on making a new brand for the CEDIA marketplace. In 1999 Haase and King offered Burkhardt a partnership. From 1994 to 2000 this team invented and patented products, grew the brand and took market share. As mentioned Burkhardt, Management and Kinsman Capital bought out Haase and King, with the two exiting the company in 2000. Burkhardt remained with the company, serving as Vice President of Sale and Marketing Along with Jim Munn the companies CEO and Bob Cavasos the companies CFO. This team-up led to the fastest growth in company history, Kinsman's access to capital vaulted SpeakerCraft to the number one position in the industry.

Management and Kinsman sold SpeakerCraft again in 2004 to Nortek, Inc, for 58 million dollars, and Burkhardt, like all minority shareholders benefited proportionately from this sale. Munn and Cavasos stepped out and Burkhardt remained as a 32-year-old CEO with a vision for growth, seeing the iPod as forever the defining grounds for SpeakerCraft's future in distributing audio through the home. Selected by CE PRO magazine as a top ten industry leader, Burkhardt again leveraged his ownership and became an owner in Nortek, Inc and was promoted to company CEO. The company currently produces more than 1000 products, which include loudspeakers, amplifiers, iPod multi-room music distribution systems, and accessories that allow for various system configurations and sizes. SpeakerCraft's patented AIM series of speakers is available in ceiling and wall versions; these were patented by Haase, Francisco and Burkhardt are the largest advancements in architectural speakers. In 2007 Haase returned to SpeakerCraft as Chief technical Officer. Developing some of the finest SpeakerCraft inventions, Haase is known as the man that invented the in-wall speaker.

=== Early research ===
Ken Humphreys and Edward Haase developed a series of architectural speakers, speakers that use the structure of a building as the “cabinet”, at the request of Fleetwood Enterprises of Riverside, California, which wanted to incorporate high-end speakers in its motor homes without taking up much space. Their first experiment with replacing bulky box speakers was a speaker featuring an in-wall mounted subwoofer, a loudspeaker used to produce low-pitch sounds. They then tested the feasibility of using walls and ceilings as alternatives for speaker cabinets; all experimenting was done with anechoic chambers, microphones, and wall enclosures. Soon Humphreys and Haase reproduced the high quality sound produced by large, space-consuming box speakers in flush-mounted architectural speakers. Much of this early work was done in conjunction with Sonance (Dana Innovations) and both companies are credited with many early developments for architectural speakers.

== Proprietary technologies ==
=== Architectural speakers ===
SpeakerCraft's first innovation was the development of the architectural speaker. Architectural speakers are built into either walls or ceilings and use the structure of the wall or ceiling as the “cabinet” to enhance performance. Components of an architectural speaker include the driver (actual speaker), cross-over (which sends the correct frequencies to the correct driver), and termination point (which is where the speaker wires connect to the frame). Driver configurations typically consist of two or three drivers that provide for the playback of the bass (low frequencies), the midrange (mid-level frequencies), and tweeter (high frequency) signals.

==== AIM ====
To overcome the directional limitations of in-wall/in-ceiling speakers, Haase, Burkhardt and Francisco invented and patented the AIM speaker technology fully represented in SpeakerCraft’s directional in-ceiling and in-wall loudspeakers. AIM in-ceiling speakers pivot in a patented ball-and-socket arrangement toward the listener while recessed in the ceiling and in the wall they move side to side and AIM toward the listening area.

==== TIME ====
TIME (Theater In Motion Experience) Series speakers are flush-mounted ceiling speakers that descend and rotate to direct sound to different positions in the room. This type of “directable” speaker was first invented by SpeakerCraft in response to customer demand for customizable sound configurations.

=== WavePlane ===
SpeakerCraft invented the WavePlane, a baffle that isolates the tweeter from the woofer in a coaxial ceiling speaker, which results in improved high frequency dispersion and fidelity.

=== MODE ===
Music On Demand Experience or MODE is an audio control system that connects the Apple iPod to a house-wide music system.

== Current product lines ==
=== In-ceiling ===
In-ceiling speakers are a type of architectural speaker designed to flush-mount into the ceiling of a structure. SpeakerCraft in-ceiling speakers include TIME and AIM Series, CRS, and DT.

=== In-wall ===
In-wall speakers are a type of architectural speaker designed to flush-mount into the wall of a structure. SpeakerCraft in-wall speakers include AIM LCR, AIM7 MT, The Rogue, AIM Cinema, AIM Cinema Dipole, AIMLCR3, and AccuFit IW7.

=== Subwoofers ===
Subwoofers are loudspeakers designed to respond to only the lowest acoustic frequencies. SpeakerCraft’s subwoofers include powered compact subwoofers, passive in-ceiling subwoofers, powered floor subwoofers, and powered in-wall subwoofers.

=== Box speakers ===
Box speakers are speakers with their own integrated cabinet (compare with architectural speakers). SpeakerCraft box speaker products include AIM Monitor and AIM MDU.

=== Outdoor speakers ===
SpeakerCraft’s Outdoor Elements (OE) and Rox lines are specialized box speakers meant to be used outdoors.

=== Control systems ===
Control systems are a variety of remotes and keypads that allow the users to operate their speaker systems. SpeakerCraft control systems include MODE, Multi Zone Controllers, EZ-Pad System, and SmartPath.

== Market share ==
SpeakerCraft competes with major brands in the home audio and home theater markets such as the following:

- TruAudio
- Paradigm Electronics
- JBL
- Klipsch
- Sonance
- Triad
- Def Tech
- NHT

== Opinions about SpeakerCraft ==
SpeakerCraft is viewed by trade publications and magazines as a niche producer of audio equipment on par in quality and price with Klipsch and JBL, but has been distinguished from its competitors for its innovation and ability to adapt to and incorporate new technologies such as Apple’s iPod.

=== Criticism ===
Consumers have criticized SpeakerCraft for the cost of its products. However, audiophiles also praise SpeakerCraft for its lifetime warranty on products and the quality of its product design, features, and sound.

=== Legal action ===
In 1995, Dana Innovations (Sonance) sued SpeakerCraft for infringement of patents on a method of retrofitting a wall to mount speakers. The speaker mounting system Sonance claimed to have patented was in fact largely invented by the SpeakerCraft partner Ken Humphreys as is evidenced by his name as an inventor. This invention is composed of a bracket attached by screws through the wall to the speaker support. The speaker is then wedged between the bar and the support surface in a hole in the wall, resulting in the speaker being flush-mounted to the wall. SpeakerCraft moved for a summary judgment of invalidity. The district court of California held that the patents were invalid because they were anticipated by an in-wall speaker offered by Boston Acoustics Inc. more than a year prior to the application dates of each patent. The U.S. Court of Appeals held that the patents were not anticipated by the Boston Acoustics product and reversed the district court’s decision and remanded the case for further proceedings. The circuit court affirmed the district court’s decision.

SpeakerCraft then developed Mounting System 540040012, which eliminated the need for the separate bracket used in the Sonance design.
