= PCRUSH =

pcRUSH.com, an Atman Inc. company
- Type: Private
- Founded: 1998
- Headquarters: El Segundo, California, U.S.
- Key people: Fred Bokhoor (Founder & CEO) Frank Khalili (Founder & COO)
- Revenue: ▲US$50 million (2013) estimate
- Number of employees: 60 (2013)
- Website: www.pcrush.com

pcRUSH.COM, an Atman Inc. company, was an internet retailer / etailer, authorized value-added reseller, and solutions provider that supplied computer/technology, consumer electronics and other products. The company was based in El Segundo, California. The company ceased operations in 2017.

== Timeline ==
pcRUSH.com was founded by Frank Khalili and partners in 1998 during the height of the technology boom.

In 2005, pcRUSH.com was named one of the Internet's Top 500 retailers by Internet Retailer Magazine, with 2004 sales revenue of $22 million. Web sales for pcRUSH.com reached $32 million in 2007, an increase of 15.1% from sales of $27.8 million in 2006.

On July 8, 2008, pcRUSH.com enters mobile commerce space with technology from industry-leading CardinalCommerce.

On December 10, 2009, pcRUSH.com / Atman, Inc. is Awarded General Services Administration (GSA) Schedule to provide technology hardware to the various Branches of the United States Federal, State/Local Governments and other entities that are eligible or required to purchase off a GSA Schedule. Schedule (GS-35F-0099W).
