= NOZA, Inc. =

NOZAsearch
- Developer(s): Blackbaud
- Website: www.nozasearch.com

NOZA, Inc., formerly a privately held Santa Barbara, California-based company established in 2006 by Craig Harris, was acquired in 2010 by Blackbaud. Blackbaud incorporated the application NOZAsearch into its analytics offering for nonprofit organizations as an Internet search engine and online database built for fundraising and prospect research by nonprofit and charitable organizations.

== History ==
After completing service as a Peace Corps volunteer in the 1990s, Harris joined with other former Peace Corps volunteers to found Servicios Ecoforestales para Agricultores (SEPA), a Paraguayan agroforestry demonstration farm. After returning to the United States he became Santa Barbara County, California’s food bank development director and a nonprofit fundraising consultant. His experience fundraising for nonprofit organizations motivated him to found NOZA. Initial funding was provided by private investors.

== Distinguishing features ==
NOZAsearch, first developed in 2005 by a team which included Chief technical officer Lonny Rollins, COO David Ruehlman, and Executive Vice President Dan Cudahy is proprietary. Search results dating from 1994 to the present are isolated and converted from publicly, though not necessarily currently, available Internet sources into a relational database and derive from, and include, charities’ annual reports, newsletters, capital and other campaign lists, and lists of event sponsors.

== Competitive position ==
Blackbaud claims the database contains more than 69,000,000 records.
