= Carbon Sciences =

Company

- Type: Public
- Traded as: OTCID Basic: CABN
- Industry: Gas to liquids
- Founded: Nevada (August 25, 2006)
- Headquarters: Santa Barbara, California
- Key people: Byron Elton (president and CEO); Naveed Aslam (CTO)
- Number of employees: 3
- Website: www.carbonsciences.com

Carbon Sciences is a public corporation based in Santa Barbara. The company was founded in 2006 and incorporated as Zingerang, Inc. Originally, the company was involved in mobile communication, but has since switched to developing CO_{2} to fuel technology. Calcium carbonate, CaCO_{3}, was briefly looked at as another end product of CO_{2} recycling. On April 2, 2007, the name was changed to Carbon Sciences Inc. Their process differs from other projects in that it does not utilize high pressure or high temperature. This would be a significant advantage when trying to scale the technology up to commercial production.

== Technology ==
Byron Elton, the CEO and president of Carbon Sciences, explained in a report with Newsweek that they are in the developmental stages of a carbon recycling technology that involves capturing the greenhouse gas, CO_{2}, and transforming it into gasoline, jet fuel, diesel fuel, methanol, propane, and butane. The main process involves taking the oxygen molecules out of water and carbon dioxide in a biocatalytic process. The remaining carbon monoxide and hydrogen are then combined to make basic hydrocarbons using the Fischer–Tropsch process. These hydrocarbons are then transformed into a variety of fuels. In the early stages of the technology the process required pure carbon dioxide and pure water. However, updates to the technology will allow it to be placed at the output of a large emitter, such as a power plant, where many other elements and compounds are present. Their catalyst was developed in partnership with the University of Saskatchewan. If the methane is obtained from a landfill, the process would completely utilize recycled compounds. The end product would be much cleaner than natural fuels because it would not contain smog-causing air pollutants.

An application has been sent in for funding from the Department of Energy under the category "Innovative Concepts for Beneficial Uses of CO_{2}" and a patent application has been submitted to the United States Patent and Trademark Office. Similar technology is also being developed at the Sandia National Laboratories and at a joint venture between UOP LLC and the University of Southern California. Robert Boyce, an editor for the New York Times, challenged the wisdom of carbon capture asserting that is an energy-intensive process and "unlike natural gas, carbon dioxide is a worthless waste product." Elton responded with a letter that was published in both the print and online versions of the newspaper. In the letter he states "The problem with C.C.S. is not the C.C. (carbon capture), but the S. (storage). C.C.R., on the other hand (carbon capture and recycling), is a terrific bet on carbon." He also added "Our CO_{2}-based technology is a radical departure from conventional GTL processes. We anticipate we will significantly reduce capital costs and be CO_{2} negative, two major current challenges." After Carbon Sciences announced successful testing of their catalyst, Ariel Schwartz pointed out that until the project can be tested outside of a lab setting it is still a big "if".

== See also ==
- Carbon capture and storage
- Carbon sequestration
- Carbon dioxide removal
- Global warming
- Energy policy of the United States
