= Birdwell (clothing) =

American surf clothing company

- Company type: Subsidiary
- Industry: Retail, textile
- Founded: 1961; 65 years ago
- Headquarters: Santa Ana, California, United States
- Area served: Worldwide
- Products: Surfwear • Streetwear
- Website: www.birdwell.com

Birdwell, makers of Birdwell Beach Britches, is an American surf clothing company headquartered in Santa Ana, California. Founded by Carrie Birdwell Mann in 1961, the company manufactures and sells customized heavy-duty swimsuits, which are sold internationally. With four basic models, various fabrics, including Surfnyl, Tactel, heavy nylon, sailcloth, and canvas, more than 40 colors, and various other options, the combinations that can be created are nearly endless. The company's motto is "Quality is our Gimmick." The motto was coined by Surfer Magazine publisher, Steve Pezman.

The swimsuits themselves, which resemble board shorts, are paneled swimsuits, with waistbands resembling those of boxing trunks, always double-stitched, always with two layers of fabric. These shorts are known and favored among surfers, lifeguards, and paddleboarders, because of their quick-drying design and extreme durability; with an estimated 10 years for average use, and 2–5 for more strenuous use. Their core nylon shorts made from their "Surfnyl™" blend are made in USA and have been since 1961.

On all of the trunks there is a 2 square inches (13 cm^{2}) logo, of a stylized anthropomorphic surfboard, wearing, of course, Birdwell Beach Britches, nicknamed "Birdie".

The company has grown to develop a full line of apparel for four seasons, including pants, shorts, sweatshirts, and its iconic jackets made from Surfnyl™, its proprietary nylon blend.
