= Nationwide Asset Services =

Debt settlement company

- Industry: Financial services
- Founded: 2001 in Phoenix, Arizona and Sacramento, California
- Defunct: May 5, 2015
- Headquarters: Phoenix, Arizona and Sacramento, California
- Key people: William Anderson, President; Gary K. Brown, Secretary and Treasurer; Glen P Stewart, President of American Debt Arbitration (affiliate)
- Products: Debt settlement
- Website: www.nationwideasset.com

Nationwide Asset Services was a US-based privately owned debt settlement company based both Phoenix, Arizona and Sacramento, California. The company was also affiliated with several other firms that provide nearly identical services and their own separate websites including American Debt Arbitration, Universal Nationwide and Universal Debt Reduction. The company faced law suites in a number of states which resulted in it being barred from providing debt settlement services in those states. It was shut down in 2015.

== History ==
Debt settlement companies negotiate with creditors to accept reduced payments. Following the “Nationwide Plan,” the company claimed that a person with $20,000 in debt could pay as little as $14,400 over three years time to eliminate the debt.

In 2010, the Better Business Bureau reports that Nationwide Asset Services and American Debt Arbitration had an “F” rating, the lowest rating given, and that it had received dozens of complaints against the company in the previous 36 months.

== Controversy ==
These companies had faced lawsuits in at least four states:

=== Illinois ===
In February 2010, Illinois Attorney General Lisa Madigan filed suit against Nationwide Asset Services and American Debt Arbitration. The suit alleges that the defendants have violated the Illinois Consumer Fraud and Deceptive Business Practices Act by misrepresenting the services they can provide to consumers and the impact that those services will have on consumers’ credit. The complaint asked the court to enter a permanent injunction barring the defendants from engaging in debt settlement in Illinois and order the defendants to pay restitution for aggrieved consumers, civil penalties of $50,000 for violating the Consumer Fraud Act, an additional $50,000 penalty for each violation committed with the intent to defraud, as well as a $10,000 penalty per violation committed against a person 65 years or older.

=== Florida ===
In October 2009, The Florida Attorney General Bill McCollum filed a lawsuit against Nationwide Asset Services and its many affiliates. The suit alleges several charges including charging consumer excessive fees, false and misleading advertising, and deceptive and unfair trade practices. The attorney general said that most of the firm's sales were made by outbound telemarketing sales calls.

=== New York ===
In May 2009, New York Attorney General Andrew Cuomo sued Nationwide Asset Services for fraud, deceptive practices and false advertising. The suit alleges that customers paid high fees in advance but were still harassed by creditors, often ending up with more debt than they had before. Nationwide Asset officials said they've been cooperating with the attorney general's probe. According to Nationwide's attorney, the firm denied any wrongdoing.

=== California ===
In December 2005, the State of California issued a “Desist and Refrain Order” against Nationwide Asset Services and all of its affiliates, requiring them to cease doing business in that state without the proper licenses. The order also mentioned that Nationwide Asset Services has affiliates operating under four different names, and listing six different addresses. Further filings were made in 2006 and 2007.
