= List of companies based in the San Francisco Bay Area =

This is a list of current and former companies based in the San Francisco Bay Area, broken down by type of business.

Fortune 500 rankings are indicated in parentheses. As of 2020, 38 Fortune 500 companies had headquarters in the San Francisco Bay Area.

San Francisco-based businesses are not listed here; the subset of San Francisco-based businesses by type is at the list of companies based in San Francisco. This list includes extant businesses formerly located in the Bay Area, which have moved, or been bought out by other companies and had their headquarters relocated. With the booming tech industry in San Francisco, businesses face a lot of pressure to keep up with the surge of new companies.

== Companies currently based in the San Francisco Bay Area ==
=== Aerospace/defense ===
- L3 Technologies – Menlo Park (Randtron), San Leandro (Applied Technologies), Santa Rosa (Sonoma EO)
- Lawrence Livermore National Laboratory – Livermore
- Lockheed Martin Space Systems – Palo Alto, Sunnyvale
- Redwire Space – Mountain View
- NASA Ames Research Center – Moffett Field
- Sandia National Laboratories – Livermore
- Space Systems Loral – Palo Alto

=== Apparel ===
- Allbirds – San Francisco
- Bebe – Brisbane
- Ben Davis – San Rafael
- Betabrand – San Francisco
- Dolls Kill – San Francisco
- Everlane – San Francisco
- Gap Inc. (199) – San Francisco
- Jos. A. Bank – Fremont
- Levi Strauss & Co. (495) – San Francisco
- Marmot – Petaluma
- ModCloth – San Francisco
- Mountain Hardwear – Richmond
- O'Neill – Santa Cruz
- Poshmark – Redwood City
- Quay – San Francisco
- Title Nine - Emeryville
- Ross Stores (202) – Dublin
- Stitch Fix – San Francisco
- Tea Collection – San Francisco
- Zazzle – Redwood City

=== Automotive ===
- Cruise – San Francisco
- Lucid Motors – Newark
- Motiv Power Systems – Hayward
- Nio – San Jose
- Rivian – Palo Alto
- Uber – San Francisco
- Waymo – Mountain View
- Zoox – Foster City

=== Biotechnology ===
- 23andMe – Mountain View
- Anthera Pharmaceuticals – Hayward
- Bio-Rad Laboratories – Hercules
- BioMarin Pharmaceutical – San Rafael
- Buck Institute for Age Research – Novato
- Calico – South San Francisco
- Chiron – Emeryville
- Codex Labs - San Jose
- Genentech – South San Francisco
- Gilead Sciences (140) – Foster City
- Intuitive Surgical – Sunnyvale
- Mendel Biotechnology, Inc. – Hayward
- Nektar Therapeutics – San Francisco
- Roche Molecular Systems – Belmont
- Signature BioScience – San Francisco
- Verily Life Sciences – Mountain View
- Cepheid – Sunnyvale, California

=== Consumer goods ===
- Benefit Cosmetics – San Francisco
- Bianchi USA – Hayward
- CamelBak – Petaluma
- Clorox (474) – Oakland
- GoPro – San Mateo
- Method – San Francisco
- Sephora – San Francisco
- Specialized Bicycle Components – Morgan Hill

=== Creative/design ===
- Ammunition – San Francisco
- fuseproject – San Francisco
- IDEO – San Francisco
- Landor Associates – San Francisco
- Traction – San Francisco

=== Education ===
- Chegg – Santa Clara
- Course Hero – Redwood City
- Coursera – Mountain View
- Khan Academy – Mountain View
- KiwiCo – Mountain View
- Quizlet – San Francisco
- Remind – San Francisco
- Spring Education Group – Campbell
- Udacity – Mountain View

=== Electronics ===
- Adaptec – Milpitas
- Advanced Micro Devices (AMD) (448) – Sunnyvale
- Agilent Technologies (547) – Santa Clara
- Altera (Intel) – San Jose
- Antec – Fremont
- Apple Inc. (4) – Cupertino
- Applied Materials (218) – Santa Clara
- Asus – Fremont
- Barracuda Networks – Campbell
- Broadcom Inc. (138) – San Jose
- Brocade Communications Systems – Santa Clara
- Cisco Systems (64) – San Jose
- Daylight Computer Co. – San Francisco
- Digidesign – Daly City
- Dust Networks – Hayward
- E-mu Systems – Scotts Valley
- Fairchild Semiconductor – San Jose
- Fitbit – San Francisco
- Fujitsu Computer Products of America – Sunnyvale
- Genesis Microchip – Santa Clara
- Hewlett-Packard (58) – Palo Alto
- Hewlett Packard Enterprise (109) – San Jose
- Hitachi Data Systems – Santa Clara
- Hitachi Global Storage Technologies – San Jose
- Integrated Device Technology – San Jose
- Intel – Santa Clara
- JDS Uniphase – Milpitas
- Juniper Networks – Sunnyvale
- Keysight – Santa Rosa
- KLA Tencor – Milpitas
- Lam Research (331) – Fremont
- Logitech – Newark
- Marvell – Santa Clara
- Maxim Integrated – San Jose
- Microchip Technology – San Jose
- Monster Cable Products – Brisbane
- Nest Labs – Palo Alto
- NetApp (478) – Sunnyvale
- Nvidia (292) – Santa Clara
- Philips Lumileds Lighting Company – San Jose
- Plantronics (Now Poly) – Santa Cruz
- Rambus – Los Altos
- Sanmina-SCI (385) – San Jose
- Seagate Technology (174) – Cupertino
- Silicon Graphics – Fremont (acquired by Rackable Systems)
- Silicon Image – Sunnyvale
- Solectron Corporation – Milpitas
- Sony Optiarc America Inc. – San Jose
- Supermicro – San Jose
- Synnex (130) – Fremont
- Synopsys – Mountain View
- TDK – San Jose
- Terayon – Santa Clara
- THX – San Rafael
- Western Digital (198) – San Jose
- Xilinx – San Jose

=== Energy ===
- Bloom Energy – Sunnyvale
- Chevron (15) – San Ramon
- Cupertino Electric – San Jose
- Energy Recovery Inc. – San Leandro
- Mosaic Inc. – Oakland (solar power crowdfunding)
- PG&E (189) – Oakland
- Rosendin Electric – San Jose
- SolarCity – San Mateo
- SunEdison – Belmont
- Sungevity – Oakland
- SunPower – San Jose
- Sunrun – San Francisco

=== Engineering and construction ===
- DPR Construction – Redwood City
- Granite Construction – Watsonville
- Katerra – Menlo Park
- Swinerton – San Francisco
- Webcor Builders – San Francisco

=== Entertainment ===
- American Zoetrope – San Francisco
- Capcom U.S.A. – San Francisco
- Crunchyroll – San Francisco
- Dolby Laboratories – San Francisco
- Electronic Arts – Redwood City
- Industrial Light & Magic – San Francisco
- Kerner Optical – San Rafael
- Lucasfilm Animation – San Rafael (Lucas Valley)
- Netflix (164) – Los Gatos
- Niantic – San Francisco
- Pandora Radio – Oakland
- Philo – San Francisco
- Pixar – Emeryville
- Roblox Corporation – San Mateo
- Sega of America – San Francisco
- Skywalker Sound – San Rafael (Lucas Valley)
- Sony Interactive Entertainment (PlayStation) – San Mateo
- Ubisoft – San Francisco
- Zynga – San Francisco

=== Financial ===
- Bill.com – San Jose
- Block, Inc. – San Francisco
- Brex – San Francisco
- Calypso Technology – San Francisco
- Coinbase – San Francisco
- FICO (Fair Isaac Corporation) – San Jose and San Rafael
- Fireman's Fund Insurance Company – Novato (now Allianz Global Corporate & Specialty)
- First Republic Bank – San Francisco
- Fisher Investments – Woodside
- Franklin Templeton Investments (493) – San Mateo
- Lending Club – San Francisco
- Patelco Credit Union – Dublin
- PayPal (182) – San Jose
- Robert Half International (482) – Menlo Park
- Robinhood – Menlo Park
- SigFig – San Francisco
- Silicon Valley Bank – Santa Clara
- SoFi – San Francisco
- TPG Sixth Street Partners – San Francisco
- Visa, Inc. (137) – San Francisco
- Wells Fargo Bank (30) – San Francisco
- Yodlee – Redwood City

=== Food and drink ===
Food and drink establishments with one location are not included in this list. Local and regional establishments with more than one location are included.

- 21st Amendment Brewery – San Leandro
- Anchor Brewers & Distillers, LLC – San Francisco
- Annabelle Candy Company – Hayward
- Annie's Homegrown – Berkeley
- Black Angus Steakhouse – Los Altos
- Blue Bottle Coffee – Oakland – subsidiary of Nestle
- C&H Pure Cane Sugar – Crockett
- Clif Bar – Emeryville
- Columbus Salame – Hayward
- Dreyer's Grand Ice Cream – Oakland
- Extreme Pizza – San Francisco
- Ghirardelli Chocolate Company – San Leandro
- Häagen-Dazs – Oakland
- Hodo – Oakland
- Il Fornaio – Corte Madera
- Impossible Foods – Redwood City
- Jelly Belly – Fairfield
- Martinelli's – Watsonville
- Mountain Mike's Pizza – Hayward
- Odwalla – Half Moon Bay
- Otis Spunkmeyer – San Leandro
- Peet's Coffee & Tea – Emeryville
- Point Reyes Farmstead Cheese Company – Point Reyes Station
- PowerBar – Berkeley
- R. Torre & Company, Inc. – San Leandro
- See's Candies – South San Francisco
- Shasta – Hayward
- Takaki Bakery (Andersen Institute of Bread and Life) – Hayward
- Togo's – San Jose
- Verve Coffee Roasters – Santa Cruz

=== Healthcare ===
- Castlight Health – San Francisco
- Eargo – Mountain Valley
- Kaiser Permanente – Oakland
- One Medical – San Francisco
- Palo Alto Medical Foundation – Palo Alto

=== Internet ===
- Airbnb – San Francisco
- Alphabet Inc. (11) – Mountain View
- Ask.com – Oakland
- Box – Redwood City
- Cisco (64) – San Jose
- Craigslist – San Francisco
- Deel – San Francisco
- DoorDash – San Francisco
- Dropbox – San Francisco
- Ebates – San Francisco
- eBay (295) – San Jose
- Evernote – Redwood City
- Fandom – San Francisco
- Glassdoor – Mill Valley
- Google – Mountain View – subsidiary of Alphabet Inc.
- Instacart – San Francisco
- LinkedIn – Sunnyvale
- Lyft – San Francisco
- Meta (46) – Menlo Park
- Pinterest – San Francisco
- Poll Everywhere – San Francisco
- Poshmark – Redwood City
- Postmates – San Francisco
- Quora – Mountain View
- Replit – Foster City
- Rubrik – Palo Alto
- Salesforce.com (190) – San Francisco
- Slack Technologies – San Francisco
- SurveyMonkey – San Mateo
- Tripping.com – San Francisco
- Twitch – San Francisco
- Uber (228) – San Francisco
- Wikimedia Foundation – San Francisco
- Workday – Pleasanton
- Yelp – San Francisco
- YouTube – San Bruno – subsidiary of Alphabet Inc.
- Yummly – Palo Alto – subsidiary of Whirlpool Corporation
- Zendesk – San Francisco
- Zoom Video Communications – San Jose
- Zoosk – San Francisco

=== Media ===
- Communication Arts – Menlo Park
- Complex – San Francisco
- Daily Review – Hayward
- Dwell – San Francisco
- Future US – South San Francisco
- POPSUGAR Inc. – San Francisco
- San Francisco Chronicle – San Francisco
- San Jose Mercury News – San Jose
- University of California Press – Berkeley

=== Mobile media ===
- Bleacher Report – San Francisco
- MobiTV – Emeryville
- TubeMogul – Emeryville

=== Musical instruments and accessories ===
- Dunlop Manufacturing – Benicia
- E-mu Systems – Scotts Valley
- Saga Musical Instruments – South San Francisco
- Santa Cruz Guitar Company – Santa Cruz
- Universal Audio – Scotts Valley

=== Networking ===
- A10 Networks – San Jose
- Arista Networks – Santa Clara
- Aryaka Networks – Milpitas
- Barefoot Networks (Intel) – Palo Alto
- Brocade Communications (Broadcom) – San Jose
- Cisco (64) – San Jose
- Ericsson – Santa Clara
- Extreme Networks – San Jose
- F5 Networks – San Jose
- Fortinet – Sunnyvale
- Juniper Networks – Sunnyvale
- Minerva Networks – San Jose
- NETGEAR – San Jose
- Palo Alto Networks – Santa Clara

=== Real estate ===
- Digital Realty – San Francisco
- Jay Paul Company – San Francisco
- LiquidSpace – San Francisco
- Prologis – San Francisco
- Trulia – San Francisco

=== Retail ===
- BevMo! – Concord
- California Closets – Richmond
- Cost Plus Inc. – Alameda
- Gap.com – San Francisco
- Grocery Outlet – Emeryville
- Gymboree – San Francisco
- Jos. A. Bank – Fremont
- Levi's – San Francisco
- Macys.com – San Francisco
- Minted – San Francisco
- Pottery Barn – San Francisco
- Restoration Hardware – Corte Madera
- Ross Stores (412) – Dublin
- Safeway – Pleasanton – subsidiary of [Albertsons]
- Sephora – San Francisco
- Shutterfly – Redwood City
- Timbuk2 – San Francisco
- Walmart.com – San Bruno
- West Marine – Watsonville
- Williams-Sonoma, Inc. (489) – San Francisco
- Zazzle – Redwood City

=== Software ===
- Adobe Inc. (285) – San Jose
- AppDynamics – San Francisco
- Autodesk – San Rafael
- Box – Redwood City
- Business Objects – San Jose
- Cloudera – Palo Alto
- Cloudian - San Mateo
- DocuSign – San Francisco
- Dropbox – San Francisco
- Friend (AI) - San Francisco
- Genesys – Daly City
- GitHub – San Francisco
- Imperva – San Mateo
- Intuit (445)– Mountain View
- Malwarebytes – Santa Clara
- McAfee – Santa Clara
- Medallia – Palo Alto
- Mozilla – Mountain View
- Neo4j – San Mateo
- New Relic – San Francisco
- Nutanix – San Jose
- Objectivity, Inc. – San Jose
- Palantir Technologies – Palo Alto
- People Power Company – Palo Alto
- Piggybackr – San Francisco
- Pivotal Software (VMware) – San Francisco
- Qualys – Foster City
- Sage Intacct – San Jose
- SAP – Palo Alto
- ServiceNow – Santa Clara
- Splunk – San Francisco
- Sybase (SAP) – Dublin
- TeleNav – Santa Clara
- TIBCO Software – Palo Alto
- Trimble – Sunnyvale
- VMware – Palo Alto

=== Sports ===
- 24 Hour Fitness – San Ramon
- All Pro Wrestling – Hayward
- Bay Area Panthers – San Jose
- Fox Racing Shox – Scotts Valley
- Giro – Santa Cruz
- Golden State Warriors – San Francisco
- GoPro – San Mateo
- JumpSport – San Jose
- Kestrel USA – Santa Cruz
- Oakland A's – Oakland
- Pac-12 Conference – Walnut Creek
- San Francisco 49ers – Santa Clara
- San Francisco Giants – San Francisco
- San Jose Barracuda – San Jose
- San Jose Earthquakes – San Jose
- San Jose Sharks – San Jose
- Santa Cruz Bicycles – Santa Cruz
- Santa Cruz Skateboards – Santa Cruz
- Santa Cruz Warriors – Santa Cruz
- Specialized Bicycle Components – Morgan Hill
- TRX System – San Francisco
- Strava - San Francisco

=== Telecommunications ===
- Avaya – Santa Clara
- Pacific Telemanagement Services – San Leandro

=== Transportation and logistics ===
- Gillig Corporation – Livermore
- Lime – San Francisco
- Lyft – San Francisco
- Uber – San Francisco

== Companies formerly based in the San Francisco Bay Area ==
This list contains both extant companies which have moved their headquarters out of the Bay Area (often during a corporate buyout), and defunct companies.

- Bank of America (9) – relocated to Charlotte, North Carolina
- Bare Escentuals – purchased by Shiseido, now headquarters in Rutherford, New Jersey
- Bechtel – relocated to Reston, Virginia
- Best Manufacturing Company – San Leandro (defunct)
- Calpine Corporation (318) – relocated to Houston, Texas
- Caterpillar Inc. (50) – relocated to Peoria, Illinois
- Chaosium – formerly based in Oakland, then Hayward, now based in Ann Arbor, Michigan
- Charles Schwab Corporation (271) – San Francisco – moved to Westlake, TX
- Charlotte Russe – acquired by YM Inc.
- ComputerLand – Hayward (defunct)
- Esprit – relocated to Ratingen, Germany and Hong Kong, China
- Etec Systems, Inc. – Hayward (defunct)
- Excite@Home – purchased by Ask.com
- Flickr – acquired by Yahoo!
- FMC Corporation (Farm Machinery Corp, Farm Machinery and Chemical Corp) – moved headquarters from San Jose to Chicago; subsequently moved to Philadelphia
- Folgers Coffee – acquired by The J.M. Smucker Co.
- Friden, Inc. – San Leandro (defunct)
- Hambrecht & Quist, LLC – purchased by Chase Manhattan Bank, later folded into JP Morgan Securities following Chase's purchase of JPM
- Hearst Corporation – relocated to New York City
- Hills Brothers Coffee – purchased by Massimo Zanetti Beverage USA
- Hunt Brothers Cannery – moved from Hayward
- JanSport – Alameda acquired by VF Corporation
- Jamba Juice – moved from Emeryville to Frisco, Texas
- Knight-Ridder – purchased by The McClatchy Company
- Leslie Salt – purchased by Cargill in 1978
- Maxtor – Milpitas – acquired by Seagate
- McKesson Corporation – moved from San Francisco to Irving, Texas
- Mervyn's – Hayward (defunct)
- Montgomery Securities – purchased by NationsBank Corporation on June 30, 1997
- National Semiconductor – Santa Clara – acquired by Texas Instruments
- NUMMI – automobile manufacturer (defunct)
- Oracle (82) – moved headquarters from Redwood City to Austin, Texas
- Pacific Telesis – acquired by SBC Communications, which became AT&T when it purchased AT&T Corporation
- Pegasus Aviation Finance Company – acquired by AWAS
- Peterbilt Motors – relocated to Denton, Texas
- Pier 1 – started in San Mateo, now headquartered in Fort Worth, Texas
- Qume – Hayward (defunct)
- Robertson Stephens – closed by its parent company FleetBoston in July 2002
- Rolling Stone – relocated to New York City, New York
- SanDisk – Milpitas – acquired by Western Digital
- Scharffen Berger Chocolate Maker – acquired by The Hershey Company
- The Sharper Image
- Six Apart – moved to Tokyo
- Southern Pacific – acquired by Union Pacific Railroad
- Speak With A Geek – defunct recruitment agency
- Swensen's Ice Cream – acquired by International Franchise Corp (IFC) of Markham, Ontario, Canada
- Tesla (124) – moved to Austin, TX
- Transamerica – purchased by Aegon
- United Commercial Bank – acquired by East West Bank
- URS Corporation – San Francisco – acquired by AECOM
- Victoria's Secret – started in Palo Alto, now headquartered in Reynoldsburg, Ohio
- Virgin America – Burlingame – acquired by Alaska Airlines
- X Corp. – moved to Bastrop, TX
- Yahoo! (353) – Sunnyvale- acquired by Verizon Media
- Symantec (461) – started in Mountain View, headquartered in Tempe, Arizona around 2020

== See also ==
- List of California companies
- List of companies based in Berkeley, California (subset, mostly included in this list)
- List of companies based in Hayward, California (subset, mostly included in this list)
- List of companies based in Oakland, California (subset, mostly included in this list)
