= List of companies based in Hayward, California =

This is a list of current and former companies operating in, or based in, Hayward, California. Significant local divisions of national and international companies are included, as are local businesses. Former companies that have closed, been acquired by other companies, or moved are also listed. Other economically or culturally important institutions, such as shopping malls, colleges, and nonprofit organizations, are included.

== Retail ==
Southland Mall entrance

Southland Mall is the largest shopping center in Hayward. It houses the anchor department stores Sears, Kohl's and Macy's, and other retailers. In addition to a Target store at the Skywest Commons mall, the city's major retailers include Home Depot and Office Depot. A Costco Business Center is located there.

== Manufacturing ==
Hayward has a large number of manufacturing businesses and corporate headquarters, including high-tech companies, and is considered part of a northern extension of Silicon Valley. (Companies manufacturing in Hayward are in bold text.)

- Alphabet Energy, cofounded in 2009 by Matthew L. Scullin and Peidong Yang, manufacturer of thermoelectric devices based on tetrahedrite
- Andersen Bakery, American branch of the Japan-based business Takaki Bakery
- **Annabelle Candy**, makers of Abba-Zaba bars, moved to Hayward in 1965
- Anthera Pharmaceuticals

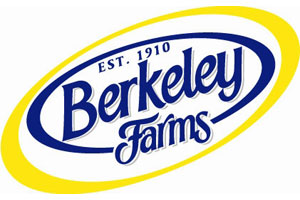
Berkeley Farms

- **Berkeley Farms**, opened a state-of-the-art processing plant in Hayward in 1998
- Bianchi Bicycles, American branch
- **Columbus Salame**, opened a new $31 million processing facility in 2011, replacing their former facility in South San Francisco
- Dust Networks, wireless sensor network manufacturer

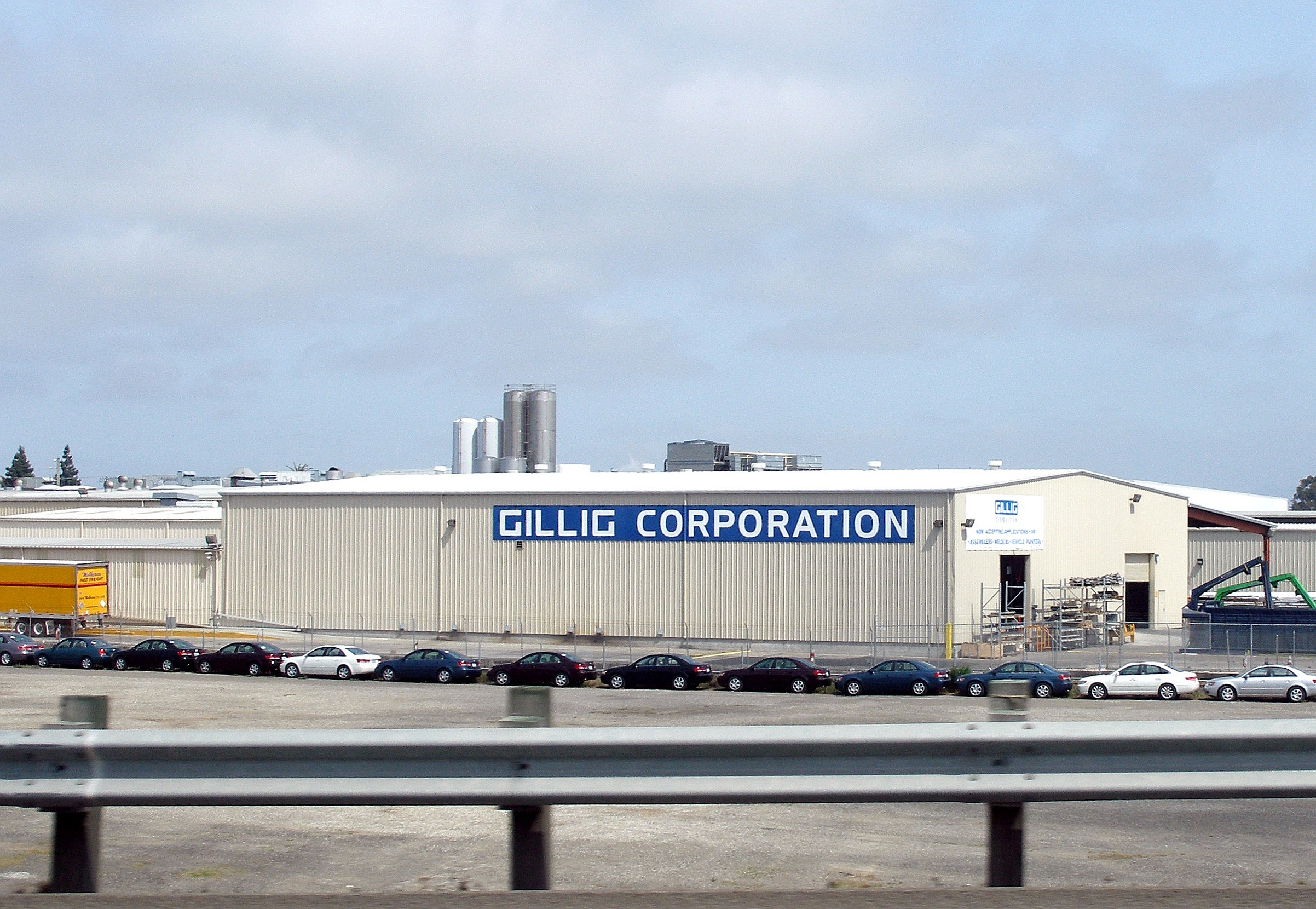
Gillig plant

- **Gillig Corporation**, manufacturer of low floor transit buses
- Illumina, operates a research and development center, formerly Solexa
- **Impax Laboratories**, drug manufacturer; headquarters and a 1.2 billion unit/year production facility
- Intarcia Therapeutics
- Kobe Steel, Japanese; operates a subsidiary, Kobe Precision
- Kosan Biosciences, founded in Hayward in 1995
- Manheim San Francisco Bay, a division of Manheim Auctions
- Marelich Mechanical, HVAC company, a subsidiary of Emcor
- Mendel Biotechnology, founded in Hayward in 1997
- **Motiv Power Systems**, manufacturer of all-electric powertrains that can be dropped into diesel truck chassis
- Mountain Mike's Pizza, restaurant chain, headquarters
- Nakagawa Manufacturing USA, a division of Nakagawa Manufacturing, Saitama, Japan, operates a thermal paper facility
- **PepsiCo**, operates its San Francisco Bay production and distribution center
- Plastikon, a plastics manufacturer with locations worldwide; based in Hayward and is its 10th largest employer in Hayward
- Recording King, guitar and banjo designers
- Rocket Dog, women's shoe designers
- Sakura Color Products of America, the American division of Sakura Color Products Corporation
- Shasta, soft drink company, headquarters

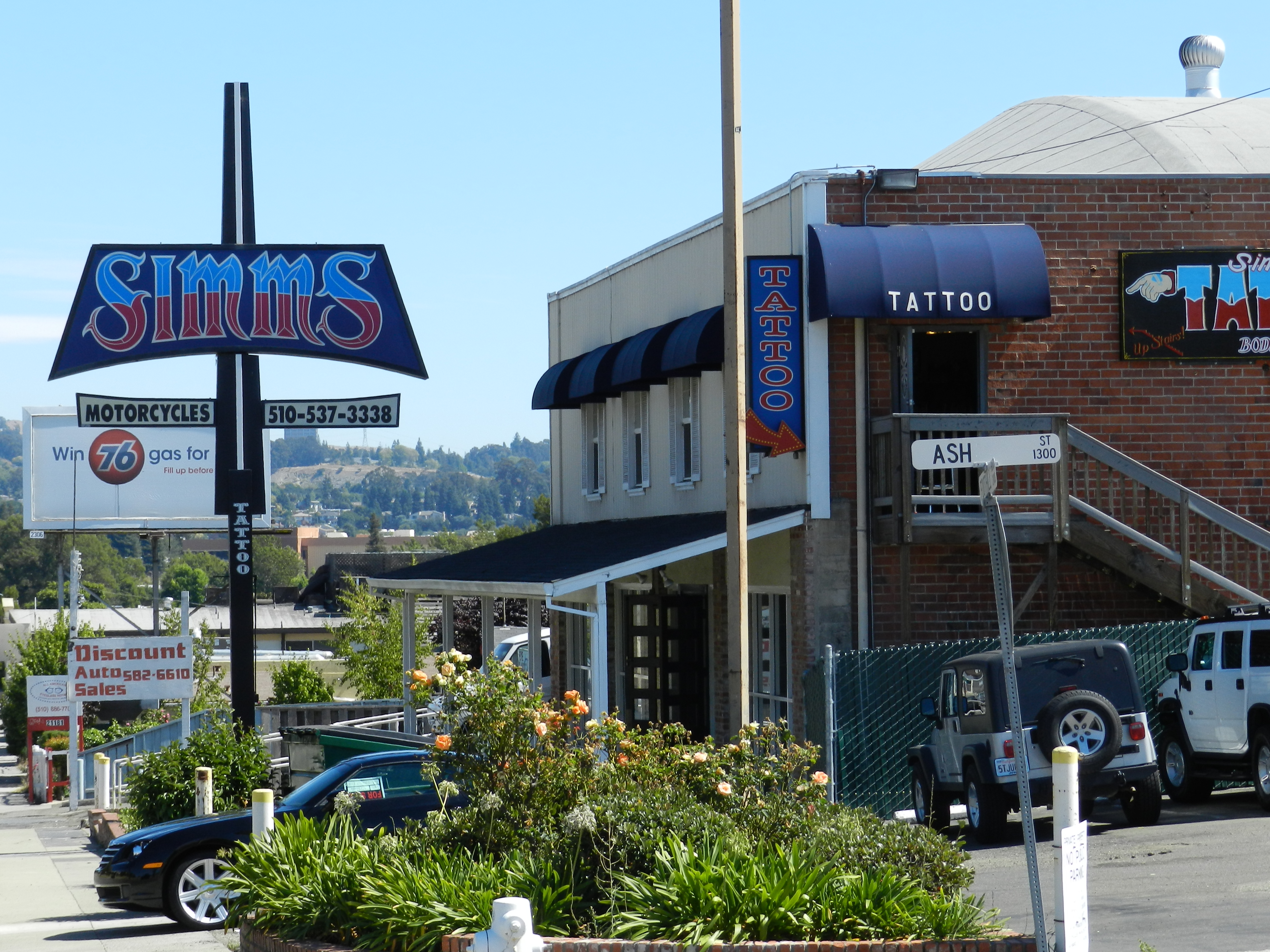
Simm's Custom Cycles

- **Simms' Custom Cycles**, founded by legendary custom motorcycle builder Ron Simms
- **Sugar Bowl Bakery**, founded in 1984 in San Francisco, facilities consolidated in Hayward from locations in Hayward and San Francisco

== Other ==
- Ace Hardware, owned by news reporter Jim Wieder; is in an historic building, built in 1900, where boxer Max Baer once trained
- All Pro Wrestling, wrestling venue
- Buffalo Bill's Brewery, one of the first brewpubs in California since Prohibition
- California State University, East Bay, operates its main campus in Hayward
- Chabot College, junior college
- Chapel of the Chimes, cemetery and funeral home
- Green Shutter Hotel, historic building, until 2017 was operated as a residential hotel, in addition to having retail businesses
- Russell City Energy Center, a 429 megawatt natural gas fired power plant; went online in 2013
- St. Rose Hospital

== Top employers ==
=== 2014 ===
According to the city's 2014 Comprehensive Annual Financial Report, the top employers in the city, representing 6.5% of total city employment, were:

#	Employer	# of employees
1	Hayward Unified School District†	2500
2	California State University, East Bay†	1447
3	Kaiser Permanente†	1200
4	City of Hayward†	845
5	St. Rose Hospital†	842
6	Gillig†	700
7	Impax Laboratories†	700
8	Chabot College†	600
9	Manheim Auctions (AKA Bay Cities Auto)	500
10	Marelich Mechanical	500

=== 2013 ===
According to the city's 2013 Comprehensive Annual Financial Report, the top employers in the city, representing 8.2% of total city employment, were:

#	Employer	# of employees
1	Kaiser Permanente†	2,500
2	California State University, East Bay†	2,207
3	Hayward Unified School District†	2200
4	Alameda County	1200
5	City of Hayward†	800
6	Gillig†	700
7	St. Rose Hospital†	700
8	Pentagon Technologies	650
9	Berkeley Farms	600
10	Impax Laboratories†	594

=== 2012 ===
According to the city's 2012 Comprehensive Annual Financial Report, the top employers in the city, representing 6.8% of total city employment, were:

#	Employer	# of employees
1	Hayward Unified School District†	2,200
2	California State University, East Bay†	1880
3	Kaiser Permanente†	1200
4	Alameda County	1114
5	St. Rose Hospital	842
6	City of Hayward†	786
7	Gillig†	700
8	Chabot College†	494
9	Kobe Precision	450
10	Plastikon†	400

=== 2011 ===
According to the city's 2011 Comprehensive Annual Financial Report, the top employers in the city, representing 8% of total city employment, were:

#	Employer	# of employees
1	Kaiser Permanente†	2,200
2	Alameda County	2,000
3	Hayward Unified School District†	1981
4	California State University, East Bay†	1500
5	St. Rose Hospital†	1065
6	City of Hayward†	812
7	Gillig†	600
8	Chabot College†	615
9	Kobe Precision	450
10	Plastikon†	400

=== 2010 ===
According to the city's 2010 Comprehensive Annual Financial Report, the top employers in the city that year, representing 7% of total city employment, were:

#	Employer	# of employees
1	Hayward Unified School District†	2,500
2	California State University, East Bay†	1,447
3	Kaiser Permanente	1,200
4	City of Hayward†	845
5	St. Rose Hospital†	842
6	Gillig†	700
7	Chabot College†	600
8	Marelich Mechanical	500
9	Bay Cities Auto Auction	500
10	Kobe Precision	450
11	Injex Industries†	425
12	Pepsi Beverages Company/Bottling Group	400
13	Alameda Newspaper Group	300

=== 2009 ===
According to the City's 2009 Comprehensive Annual Financial Report, the top employers in the city that year were:

#	Employer	# of employees
1	Hayward Unified School District†	1,776
2	California State University, East Bay†	1,600
3	Kaiser Permanente	1,200
4	City of Hayward†	1,178
5	St. Rose Hospital†	842
6	Gillig†	700
7	Chabot College†	615
8	Marelich Mechanical	500
9	Manheim Auctions (AKA Bay Cities Auto)	500
10	Kobe Precision	450
11	Alameda Newspaper Group	425
12	Pepsi Beverages Company	400
13	Injex Industries†	375

† indicates employers wholly located or headquartered in Hayward

Two businesses which had significant employment in fiscal year 2000–2001, Mervyns (2,000), and Pacific Bell (940), no longer operate in Hayward.

== Former businesses ==
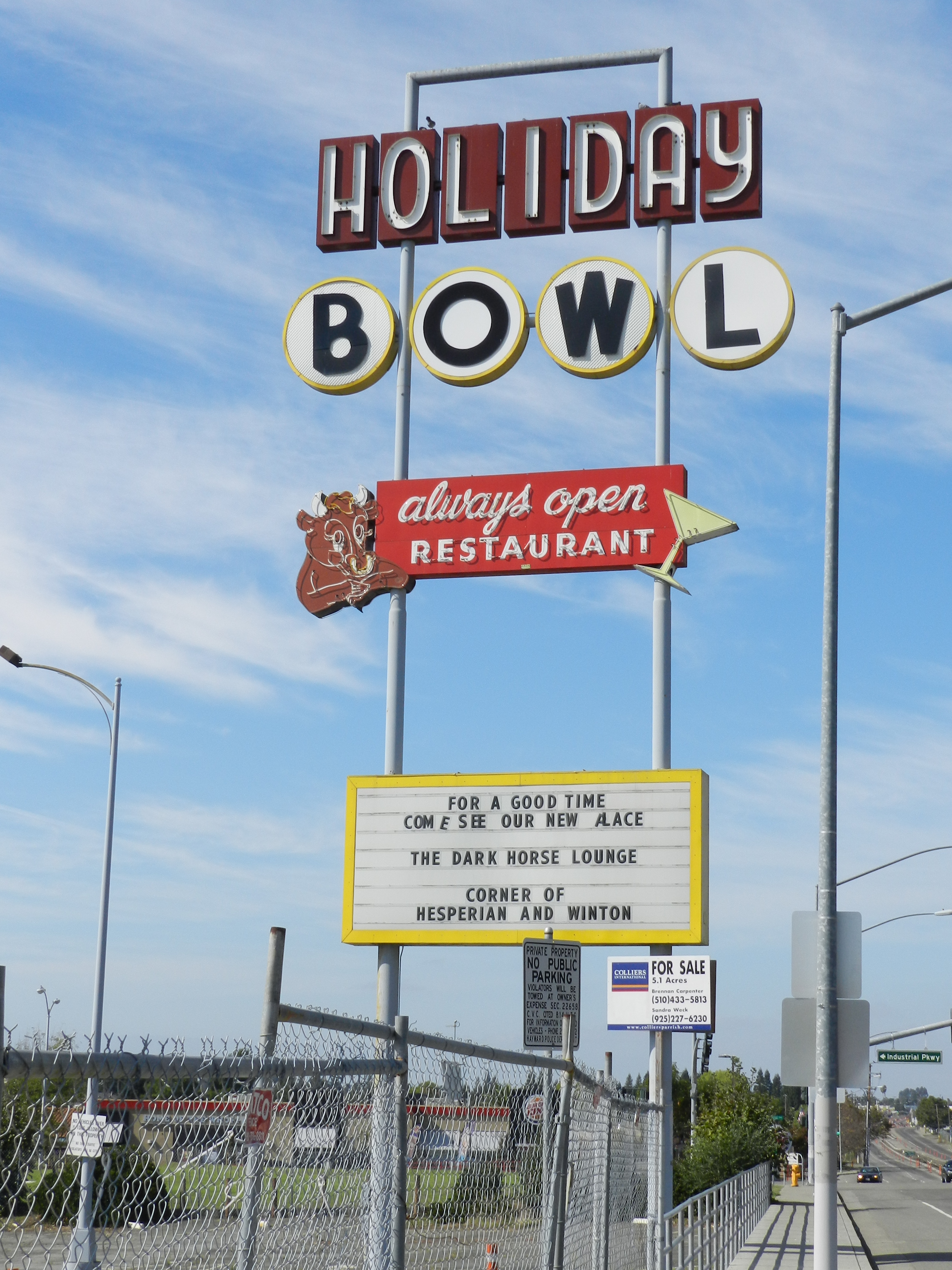
Holiday Bowl sign

=== Hunt Brothers Cannery ===
The economy of Hayward in the first half of the twentieth century was based largely on the Hunt Brothers Cannery. It was opened in Hayward in 1895 by brothers William and Joseph Hunt, who were fruit packers originally from Sebastopol, California. The Hunts initially packed local fruit, including cherries, peaches, and apricots, then added tomatoes, which became the mainstay of their business. At its height in the 1960s and 1970s, Hunt's operated three canneries in Hayward, at A, B, and C Streets; an adjacent can-making company; a pickling factory; and a glass manufacturing plant. From the 1890s until its closure in 1981, Hunt's employed a large percentage of the local population. The air around Hayward was permeated by the smell of tomatoes for three months of each year, during the canning season. The canneries closed in 1981, as there were no longer enough produce fields or fruit orchards near the cannery to make it economically viable. Much of the production was moved to the Sacramento Valley. The location of the former canneries is marked by a historic water tower with the Hayward logo. A housing development now occupies much of the former cannery site.

=== Other former businesses ===
Much of the Bay coastal territory of Hayward was turned into salt ponds, with Oliver Salt and Leslie Salt operating there. Much of this land has in recent years been returned to salt marshes. A 1983 image of the ponds appears on a 2012 US postage stamp.

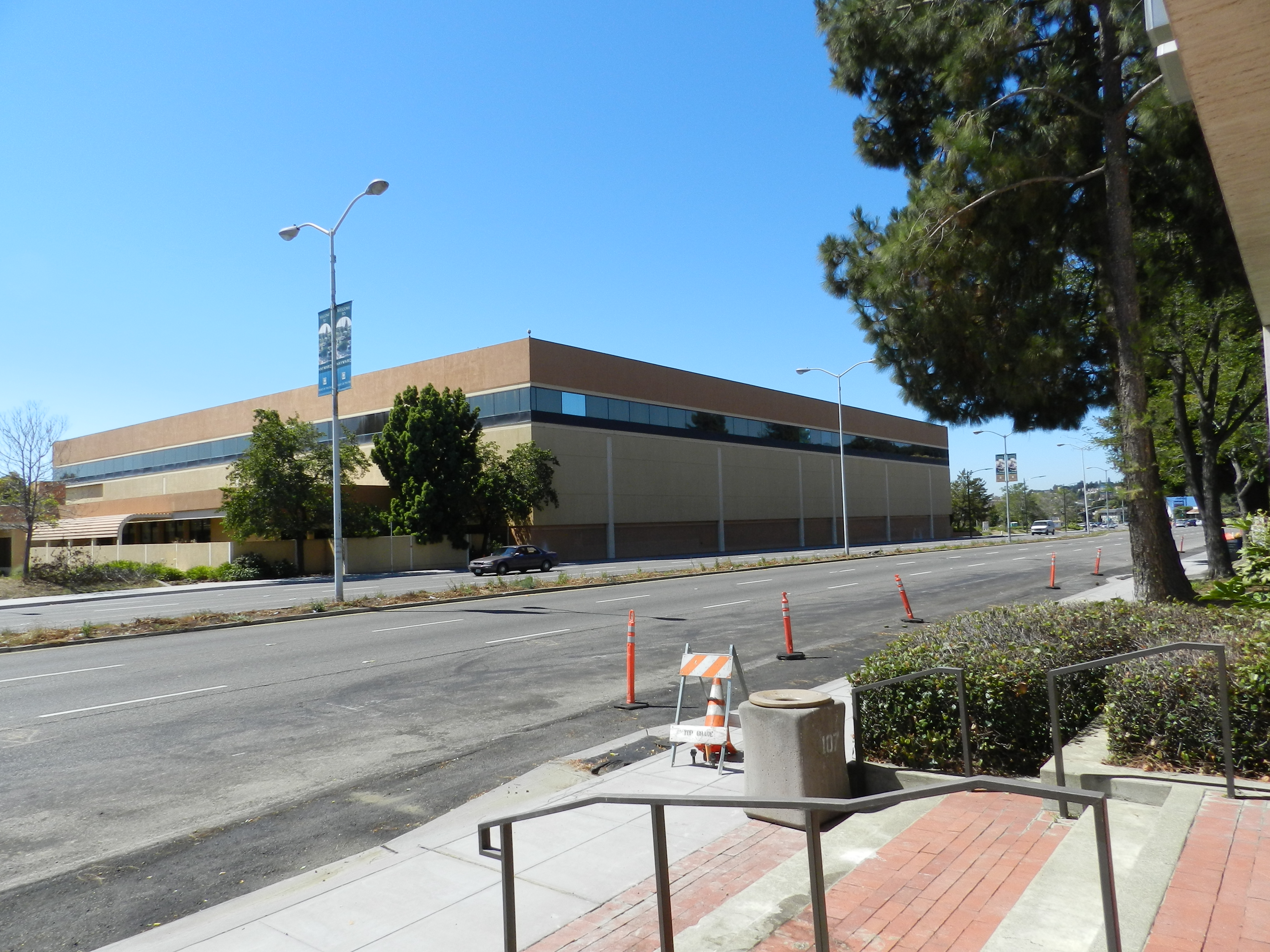
Mervyns headquarters (demolished in 2017)

- AirLink Communications, wireless service provider; operated in Hayward until its 2007 acquisition by Sierra Wireless
- Ball Corporation, operated an aluminum can factory until 1998; formerly owned by Reynolds Metals
- Banchero's, large Italian restaurant, operated from 1948 to 2012
- Chaosium, role-playing game publisher, now based in Ann Arbor, Michigan
- ComputerLand, former franchise computer retailer
- Etec Systems, Inc., operated in Hayward from 1970 until 2005, when it was closed by its parent company
- Everest College campus, closed by 2015, as part of the Corinthian Colleges collapse
- Hayward Daily Review, formerly published by the Alameda Newspaper Group, now consolidated into the East Bay Tribune
- Heald College campus, closed by 2015, as part of the Corinthian Colleges collapse
- Kaiser Permanente, operated a Kaiser Permanente Medical Center; closed when the Medical Center in neighboring San Leandro was completed
- Land and Liberty, anarchist periodical; published in Hayward from 1914 to 1915
- Mack Truck Company, manufactured trucks through the 1970s
- MDL Information Systems, founded in 1978; acquired by Symyx Technologies in 2007
- Mervyns, department store chain; was headquartered in Hayward until declaring bankruptcy in 2008
- Nellcor, founded in 1981, now a brand of pulse oximetry systems sold by Covidien
- Osborne Computer Corporation, operated a manufacturing facility in the 1980s
- Qume, daisy wheel printer manufacturer
- Star Reach, comic book publisher from the 1970s; run by Mike Friedrich
- TML Studios, recording studio owned by Tesla band member Troy Luccketta, where albums by Loudness were recorded

== See also ==
- List of companies based in the San Francisco Bay Area
