= List of companies based in Oakland, California =

This is a list of companies based in Oakland, California, including both current and former businesses.

== A ==
- AMCO Chemical
- Armor All
- Ask.com
- Atlas-Imperial

== B ==
- Babette, defunct fashion line
- BandCamp
- BarNone
- BART
- Bay Area News Group
- Blue Bottle Coffee Company
- Bookpeople, defunct book distributor
- BrightSource Energy
- Buenaventura Press

== C ==
- Catchword Branding
- Claremont Resort
- Clorox
- Colombo Baking Company
- Cost Plus, Inc.

== D ==
- Dreyer's
- Dutch

== E ==
- East Bay Express

== F ==
- Fageol
- Family Radio
- Fentons Creamery
- Free Range

== G ==
- Glad, manufacturing
- Golden West Financial
- Goldie Blox
- Granny Goose
- GT Nexus

== I ==
- Independent Iron Works
- Intrada Records

== K ==
- Kaiser Permanente
- KTVU

== L ==
- LifeRing Secular Recovery
- Livescribe

== M ==
- Magnolia Editions
- Matson, Inc., relocated to Hawaii in 2011
- Moore Dry Dock Company
- Mosaic Inc.
- Mother's Cookies

== N ==
- Namesys
- New Harbinger Publications
- New Village Press
- Next Thing Co.
- Nexus Audio Recording Studio
- Niman Ranch
- Numi Organic Tea

== O ==
- Oakland Athletics
- Oakland Roots SC
- Oakland Terminal Railway
- Oakland Tribune (corporate headquarters moved to San Jose; defunct as of April 2016)
- Oaklandish
- Oberheim Electronics
- OneCalifornia Bank
- Orb, software, shut down in 2013

== P ==
- Pac-West Telecomm
- Pacific Coast Borax Company
- Pacific Gas and Electric Company
- Pandora Radio
- Pet Food Express
- Phat Beets Produce
- PM Press

== S ==
- Safeway, moved to Pleasanton, California in 1996
- San Francisco and Oakland Helicopter Airlines
- Sequoia Voting Systems
- Sungevity
- Swarm Gallery

== T ==
- Thomas Guide
- Transocean Air Lines

== V ==
- Vaccination Records

== Y ==
- Yoshi's, jazz nightclub
- Your Black Muslim Bakery, defunct bakery

== Z ==
- DZS (formerly Zhone Technologies), moved to Plano, Texas in 2020

== See also ==
- List of companies based in the San Francisco Bay Area
