= Swag =

Swag, SWAG, or Swagg may refer to:

== Terms and slang ==
- Swag (motif) or festoon, a wreath or garland or a carving depicting foliage and ribbons
  - Swag, fabric dressing for a window valance
- Swag, stolen goods, in 1800s thieves' cant
- Swag (promotional merchandise), products branded with a logo or slogan and distributed at little or no cost to promote a brand, corporate identity, or event
- Swag (bedroll), a portable sleeping unit or bedroll

== Arts and entertainment ==
- Swag (novel), a 1976 crime novel by Elmore Leonard
- Swag (TV series), a United Kingdom reality television series
- "Swag" (Ugly Betty), the eleventh episode of the television series Ugly Betty

=== Music ===
- The Swag, song (1958) by Link Wray
- Swag (Gilby Clarke album), a 2002 album by former Guns N' Roses guitarist Gilby Clarke
- Swag (Tomomi Itano album), a 2014 album by former AKB48 member Tomomi Itano
- Swag (Justin Bieber album), the seventh studio album by Justin Bieber
- Swagg (album), album by Russian rapper Timati

== Acronyms ==
- "Supporters Without A Game", sport slang spun off from WAGs ("wives and girlfriends")
- Scientific wild-ass guess, slang for a rough estimate based on expert experience
- Sourceware Archive Group, a free collection of classified source code and sample programs written in Pascal
- Speak With A Geek, defunct recruitment agency
- Sport Writers Association of Ghana, Sports Writers Association based in Ghana
- Special Warfare Group, a former name used by the Naval Special Operations Command

== Other uses ==
- Swagg, Alabama, an unincorporated community in the United States
- Swag (cigar brand), a brand manufactured by Boutique Blends Cigars

== See also ==
- Swagger (disambiguation)
- Swagman (disambiguation)
- SWEG or Südwestdeutsche Verkehrs-Aktiengesellschaft, a transport company in southwest Germany
