= Jacob W. Davis =

Russian-American tailor (1831–1908)

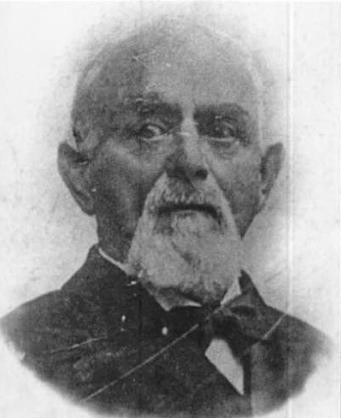
- Davis, c. 1905
- Born: Jacob Youphes; May 14, 1831; Riga, Russian Empire
- Died: January 20, 1908 (aged 76); San Francisco, California, U.S.
- Resting place: Hills of Eternity Memorial Park
- Citizenship: Russian Empire; United States
- Occupations: Tailor, Inventor, and Entrepreneur
- Known for: Invention of Jeans
- Spouse: Annie Davis (Parksher)
- Children: 6

Jacob William Davis (Russian: Якоб Яковлевич Юфес , May 14, 1831 – January 20, 1908) was a Russian-American tailor who is credited with inventing modern jeans. Growing up in Russian Empire, he emigrated to the United States as a young man and spent some time in Canada as well. He invented jeans by using sturdy cloth and rivets to strengthen weak points in the seams, and partnered with Levi Strauss to mass-produce them.

== Biography ==
Jacob Youphes was born to a Jewish family in the city of Riga, in 1831. During this time, he trained and worked as a tailor. In 1854, at the age of 23, he emigrated to the United States, arriving in New York City where he changed his name to Jacob Davis. There he ran a tailor's shop before moving to Maine and then, in 1856, San Francisco before moving on to Weaverville. After traveling around America believed to be working as a journeyman tailor, in 1858 Davis left California and moved to Western Canada in search of better opportunities. There, Davis met a German immigrant, Annie Parksher, whom he married and together, Jacob and Annie had six children. During his time in Canada, Davis worked at the Fraser River panning for gold.

In January 1867, Davis returned to San Francisco with Annie and his family. Later that year, they moved to Virginia City, Nevada, where he sold wholesale tobacco and pork before beginning work once more as a tailor. By 1868, the family had moved, this time to Reno, Nevada, which at that time was a tiny railroad town and there he helped Frederick Hertlein build a brewery. 1869 saw Davis revert to his original trade, opening a tailor shop in the main street of the town. In his tailor shop, Davis made functional items such as tents, horse blankets and wagon covers for the railway workers on the Central Pacific Railroad. The fabric Davis worked with was heavy-duty cotton duck cloth and cotton denim which he bought from Levi Strauss & Co., a dry goods company in San Francisco. To strengthen the stress points of the sewn items he was making, Davis used copper rivets to reinforce the stitching.

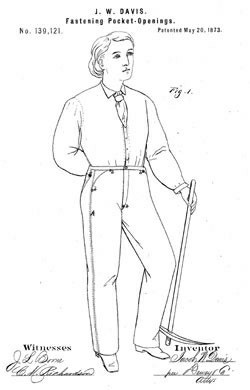
Figure from US Patent No. 139,121

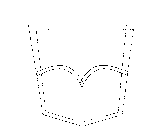
Jacob W. Davis's unique stitch design. This design is on all Levi's jeans today.

In December 1870, Davis was asked by a customer to make a pair of strong working pants for her husband who was a woodcutter. To create suitably robust pants for working, he used duck cloth and reinforced the weak points in the seams and pockets with the copper rivets. Such was the success of these pants that word spread throughout the labourers along the railroad. Davis was making these working pants in duck cotton and, as early as 1871, in denim cotton. Before long, he found he could not keep up with demand.

Davis had previously applied for patents for other inventions. Realizing the potential value in his reinforced jeans concept, in 1872, he approached Levi Strauss, who was still his supplier of fabric, and asked for his financial backing in the filing of a patent application. Strauss agreed, and on May 20, 1873, US Patent No. 139,121 for "Improvements in fastening pocket openings" was issued in the name of Jacob W. Davis and Levi Strauss and Company. That same year, Davis started sewing a double orange threaded stitched design onto the back pocket of the jeans to distinguish them from those made by his competitors. This trademark feature became Registered U.S. Trade Mark No. 1,139,254. By this time, Strauss had set up a sizeable tailor shop in San Francisco for the production of Davis' working pants and Jacob and his family had moved back to San Francisco for Davis to run this shop. As demand continued to grow, the shop was superseded by a manufacturing plant which Davis managed for Strauss. Davis continued to work there for the remainder of his life, overseeing production of the work pants as well as other lines including work shirts and overalls.

Davis died in San Francisco in 1908. He is buried at Hills of Eternity Memorial Park in Colma, California. In 2006 a plaque was erected in Reno, Nevada, outside the premises where Davis's tailor shop was located, to commemorate the fact jeans were invented there.

== See also ==
- Ben Davis (clothing)
