= Spunkmeyer =

Spunkmeyer may refer to:

- Otis Spunkmeyer, a baked-goods company
- Private D. Spunkmeyer, a character in the movie Aliens
