= IIW =

IIW may refer to:

- It Is Written
- Independent Iron Works
- International Institute of Welding
- Internet Identity Workshop
