= Swagger =

A swagger or swagga is a swaggering gait.

Swagger also may refer to:

- Swagger or swagman, a transient labourer in Australia and New Zealand
- Swagger (software), a specification for defining the interface of a REST web service
- Swagger Creek, a river in the United States
- Swagger stick, a riding crop carried by a uniformed person as a symbol of authority
- Bob Lee Swagger, fictional character created by Stephen Hunter
- Jack Swagger (born 1982), American professional wrestler
- Swagger (TV series), an American drama television series

== Musical works ==
- Swagger (EP) (1989), EP by No Man Is an Island
- Swagger (Gun album) (1994)
- Swagger (Flogging Molly album) (2000)
- Swagger (Lucie Idlout album) (2009)
- "The Swagga", a song from the 2007 Gorillaz album D-Sides

== See also ==
- Swag (disambiguation)
- Radio station "WRZE Swagga 94.1 & 105.9"
