= Swagman (disambiguation) =

A swagman was a transient labourer who travelled by foot from farm to farm carrying his belongings in a swag.

Swagman or Swagg Man may also refer to:

- Swagman (comics)
- Swagman Restaurant, in Ferntree Gully, Melbourne, Australia
- Swagman (video game)
- The Swagman, a 1965 Australian television play
- Swagg Man, (born 1988) French rapper from Tunisia, Tunis

== See also ==
- Swaggie Records, a long running Australian jazz label
