= Danny Kennedy (environmentalist) =

American environmentalist

- Born: February 24, 1971 (age 54); Los Angeles, California, U.S.
- Citizenship: United States, Australia
- Education: Bachelor of Science in Human Geography, with Honors. Macquarie University, Sydney, Australia
- Occupation(s): Entrepreneur, activist
- Known for: Co-founder of Sungevity
- Title: Managing director of the California Clean Energy Fund
- Website: Danny Kennedy on Twitter

Danny Kennedy (born February 24, 1971) is an American clean-technology entrepreneur, environmental activist, and the author of the book Rooftop Revolution: How Solar Power Can Save Our Economy—and Our Planet—from Dirty Energy (2012). Kennedy is managing director of the California Clean Energy Fund, a non-profit dedicated to optimizing the clean energy transition. He co-founded Sungevity, a residential solar power company, and Powerhouse, the primer solar incubator in Oakland. While at Sungevity, Kennedy won a Planet Forward Innovator of the Year award from the PBS program Planet Forward.

== Early life ==
Kennedy was born in Los Angeles to Australian parents. Kennedy and his family moved between the United States, Europe, and Australia until he was 11 years old, when his family settled in Sydney, Australia. Kennedy attended St. Aloysius School.

As a youngster Kennedy was a community organizer, fundraiser, journalist, and youth activist. At the age of 12 he was involved with a successful campaign to prevent construction of a dam in Tasmania. From 1983 he worked with the Australian Conservation Foundation on various projects including forestry protection and ozone depletion. In 1990 Kennedy was a representative at the Montreal Protocol Negotiations in London, where he met Alec Guettel (with whom he would later found Sungevity). In 1992 Kennedy organized around the first Rio Earth Summit and worked for the UN Conference on Environment and Development.

== Career ==
Kennedy began working with Greenpeace in the early 1990s, as a researcher seeking to end new oil exploration in Papua New Guinea. He almost died of malaria in the process. He left Greenpeace in 1995.

In 1996 Kennedy founded and directed Project Underground, an organization focused on human rights and committed to protecting people threatened by mining and oil operations.

Kennedy became the Director of the USA Clean Energy Now Campaign in 2000, and set up the California Clean Energy Now Campaign in 2001 and 2002; this campaign helped create the state's California Solar Initiative. He moved back to Australia in 2003 and was the Campaigns Manager for Greenpeace Australia Pacific from 2003 to 2006.

Kennedy has worked with the actress Cate Blanchett in a project to green the building of the Sydney Theatre Company. In 2022, Kennedy and Blanchett launched the Climate of Change podcast on Audible to discuss climate change and the importance of preserving the environment.

In December 2006, Kennedy left Australia and moved to Oakland, California, where he currently lives with his wife and his youngest daughter, to start Sungevity Inc., a residential solar power company.

In 2010 Kennedy offered to install solar panels on the roof of the White House. He also installed 48 solar panels on the roof of the residence of the president of The Maldives.

In 2015, Kennedy became managing director of the California Clean Energy Fund, a non-profit working to optimize the clean energy transition by connecting money to investments, ideas to support and issues to solutions.

Kennedy co-founded Powerhouse, the only incubator and accelerator solely focused on supporting solar entrepreneurs to succeed. Additionally, Kennedy serves on the board of The Solar Foundation, a global research and education organization in Washington, DC, VoteSolar, and several solar start-ups including Powerhive, a solar utility in Kenya, and Sunergise, a Fijian company taking solar as a service across the South Pacific, and was a founding board director of Mosaic, a solar-focused, crowd-funding start-up in Oakland, California. Kennedy writes a monthly column about renewable energy innovation, trends and opportunities called Shine On for Climate & Capital Media.
