= Overalls =

Protective clothing

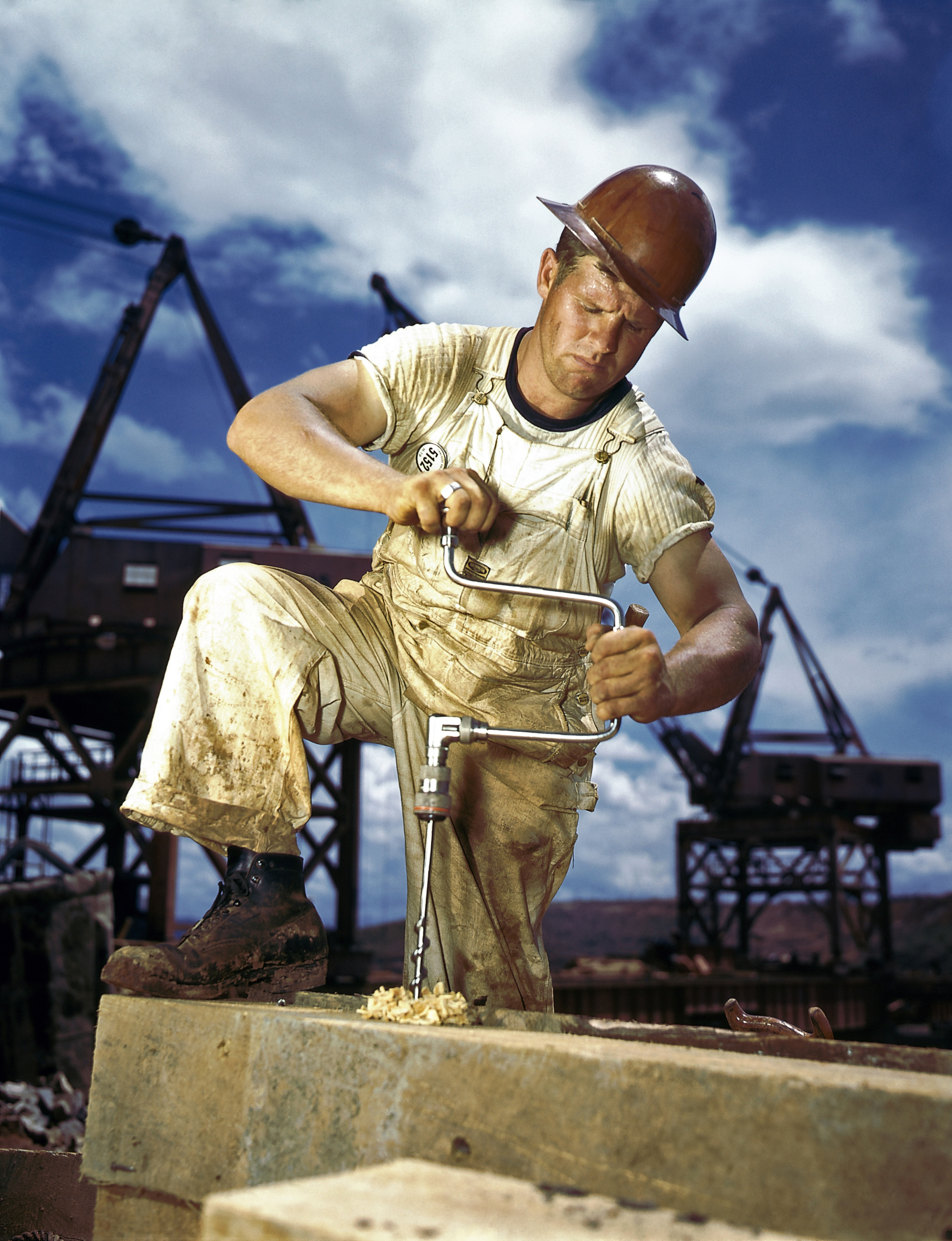
- A construction worker wearing overalls
- Type: protective clothing

Overalls or bib-and-brace overalls, also called dungarees in British English, are a type of garment usually used as protective clothing when working. The garments are commonly referred to as a "pair of overalls" by analogy with "pair of trousers".

Overalls are often made of denim, but they can also be made of other materials such as corduroy, chino cloth, or leather. Initially created to serve as protective clothing during physically demanding work, they have since also become a fashion garment. Many high-fashion brands have released their own spin on overalls. Today, overalls can still be found in some workplaces, while also being worn casually by many.

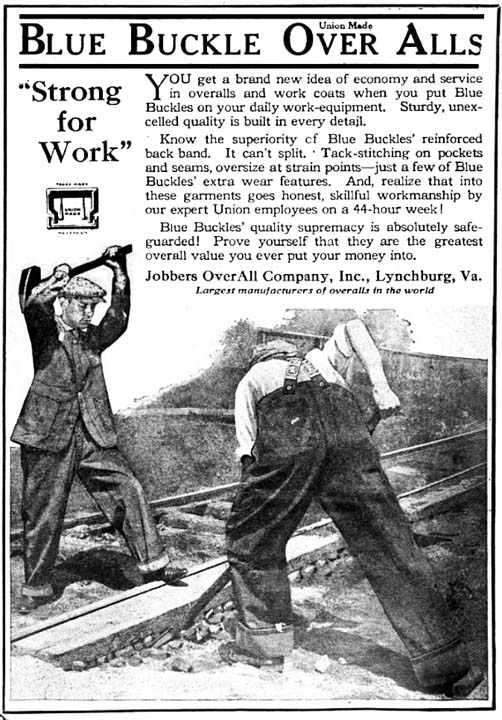
A 1920 advertisement for Over Alls, published in the Brotherhood of Maintenance of Way Employees Journal, depicts railway workers adjusting track.

== History ==
=== Beginnings ===
The exact beginnings of the wearing of overalls are unclear, but they are mentioned in literature as early as 1776 as protective working garments commonly worn by enslaved people.

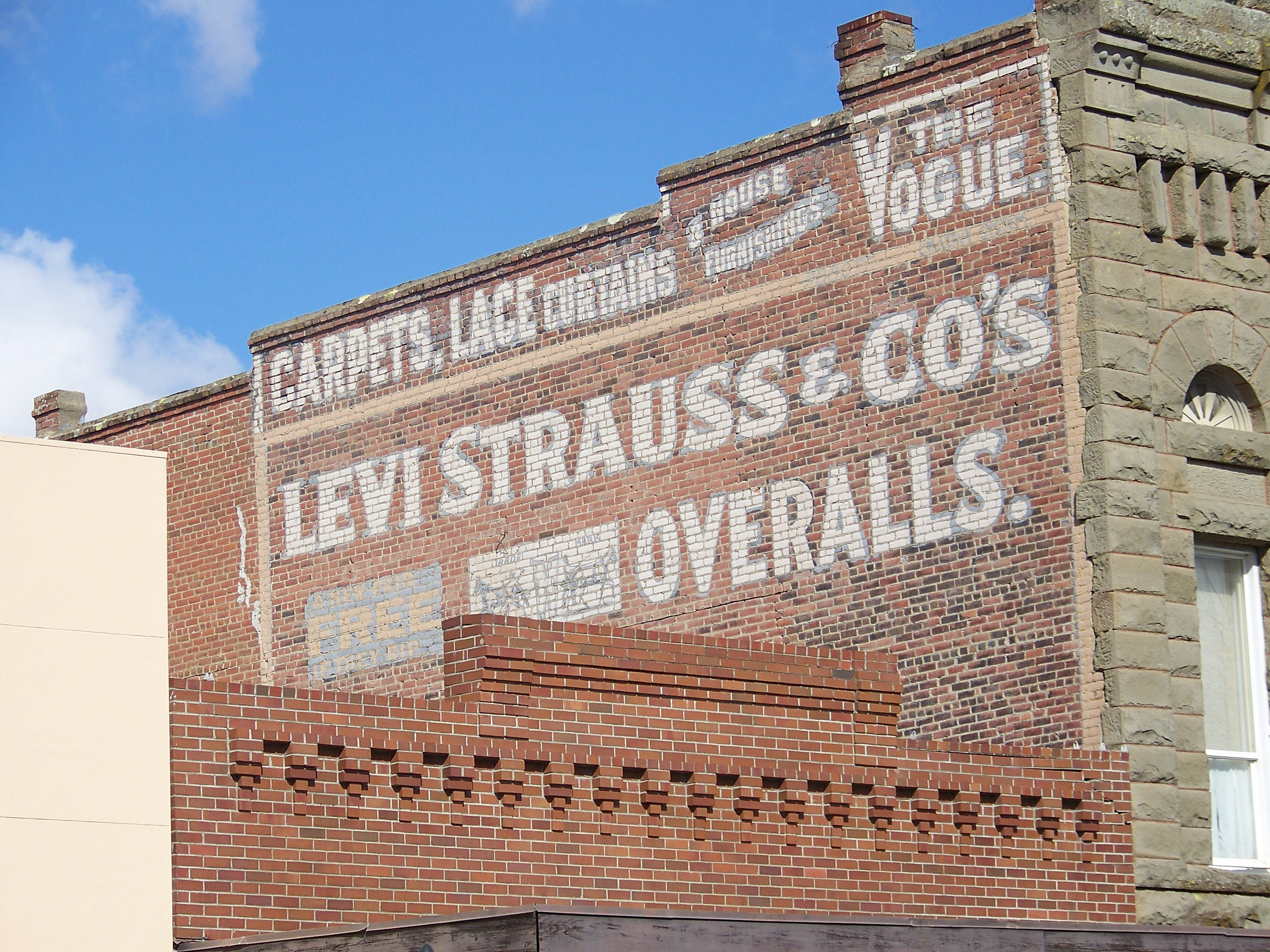
Levi Strauss sign advertising overalls

=== The Overalls Movement of 1920 ===
In 1920, groups of "Overalls Clubs" formed around the United States. They took overalls as their symbol to protest the rising cost of clothing, and profiteering in the garment industry.

=== The Great Depression ===
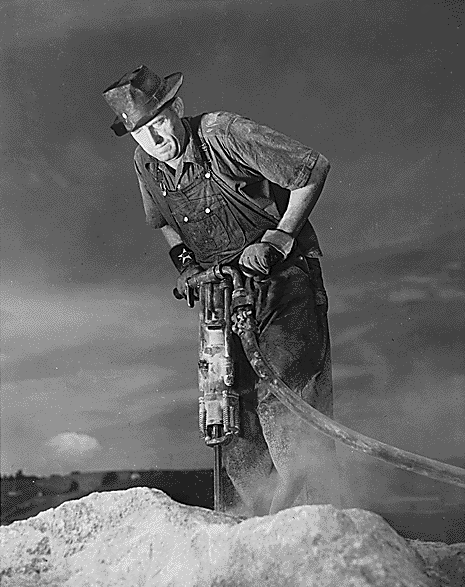
Man wearing overalls working with a jackhammer

In the 1930s, the working class of the American population wore overalls: farmers, miners, loggers, and railroad workers. They were most commonly worn by men and boys in the Southern and Midwestern United States.

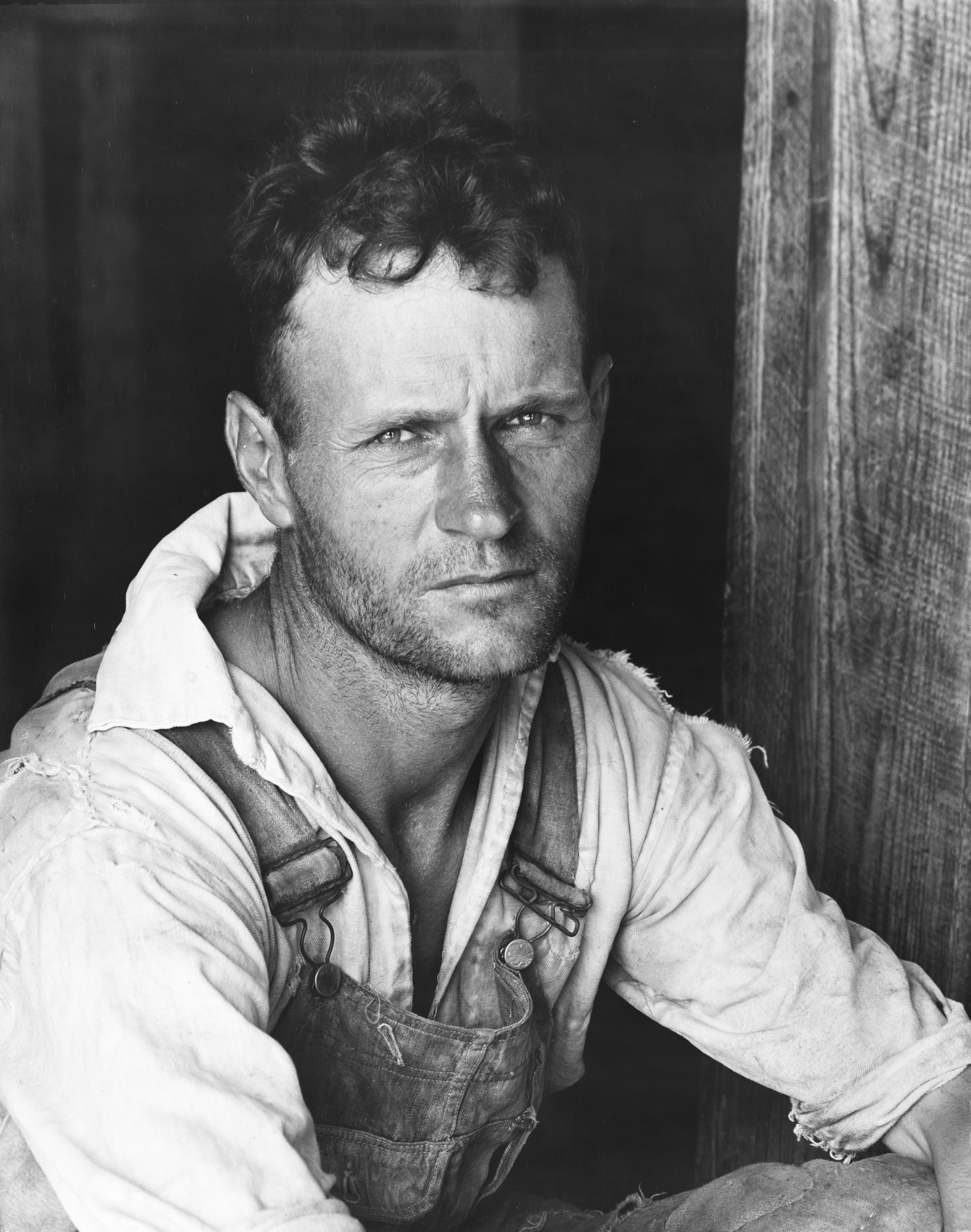
A sharecropper in Alabama wearing overalls ca. 1935

They can be seen in many of Walker Evans's photographs.

=== Modern history ===
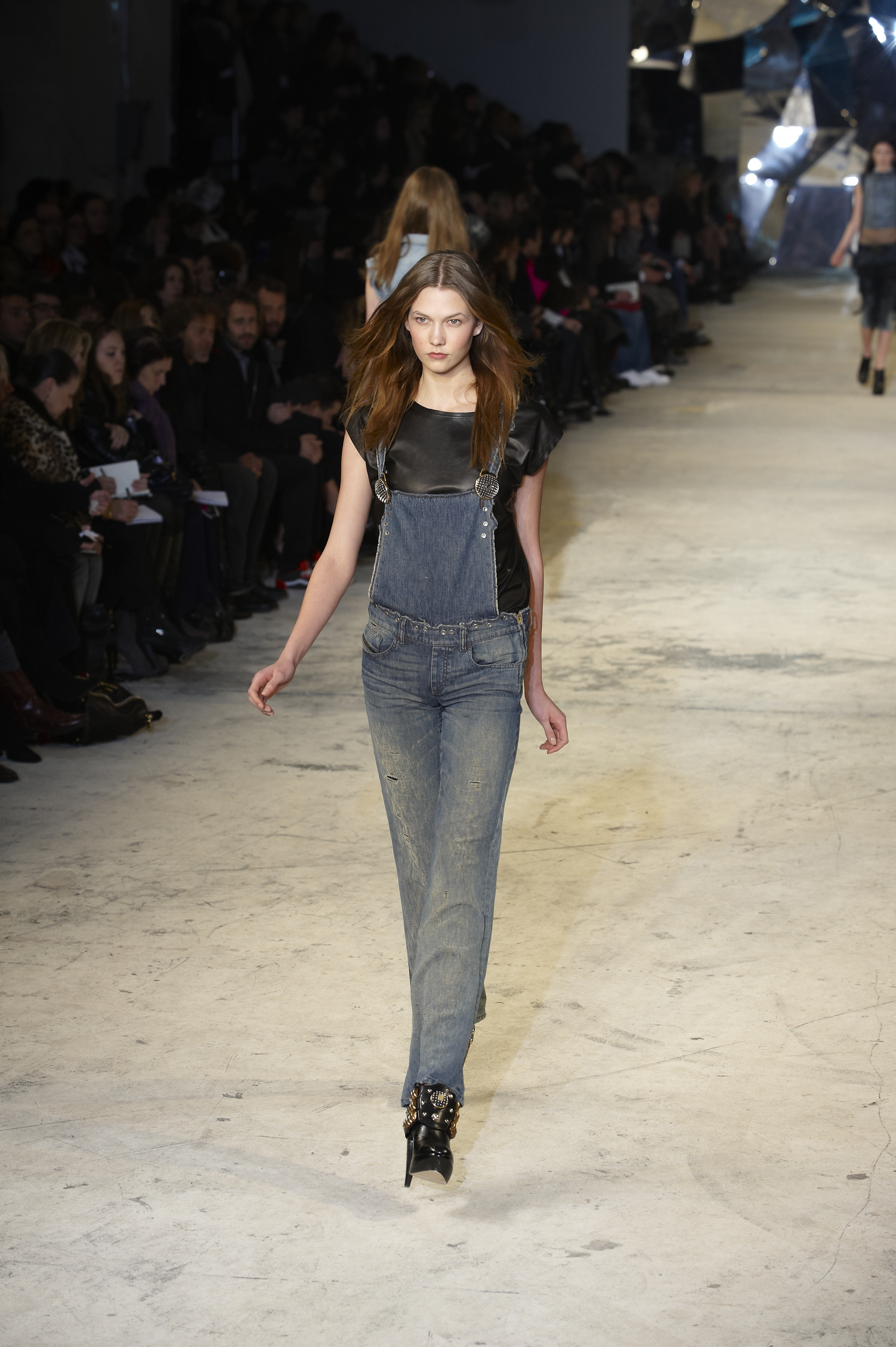
Diesel Black Gold Fall/Winter 2010 Collection

Bib overalls (in different colors and textiles) became popular garments among American youth from the 1960s onward.

Overalls were especially popular among hip hop artists during the 1990s.

In the 21st century, overalls have evolved into high-fashion garments. Designers such as Stella McCartney include them in ready-to-wear collections for men, women, and children. McCartney's children's overalls sell for as much as US$138 in the US.

== Brands ==
Levi Strauss & Co. and Lee were not the only companies making overalls in the late 19th and 20th centuries.

- One of the oldest brands of overalls, OshKosh B'gosh, founded in 1895 in Wisconsin, specialized in blue-and-white "hickory-stripe" bib overalls. The company produced bib overalls for children in the late 1960s.
- Larned, Carter & Co., from Detroit, called themselves the "World's Greatest Overall Makers". They marketed their products as uniforms for railroad workers.
- One of the biggest overall manufacturers was Blue Bell, which began in North Carolina in 1904. It was popular among railroad workers.
- Round House workwear of Oklahoma has produced heavy duty work overalls since 1903, and remains one of the only companies which still manufactures a most of their products in the United States.
- Jellico Clothing Manufacturing Co., later renamed Big Ben, was a major competitor of Blue Bell. Big Ben bought Blue Bell in 1926 and continued under the name Blue Bell. Blue Bell then purchased the overalls company Casey Jones.

Other current manufacturers of overalls include:

- Carhartt
- Dickies
- Ben Davis
- Red Kap

== Garments adapted from overalls ==
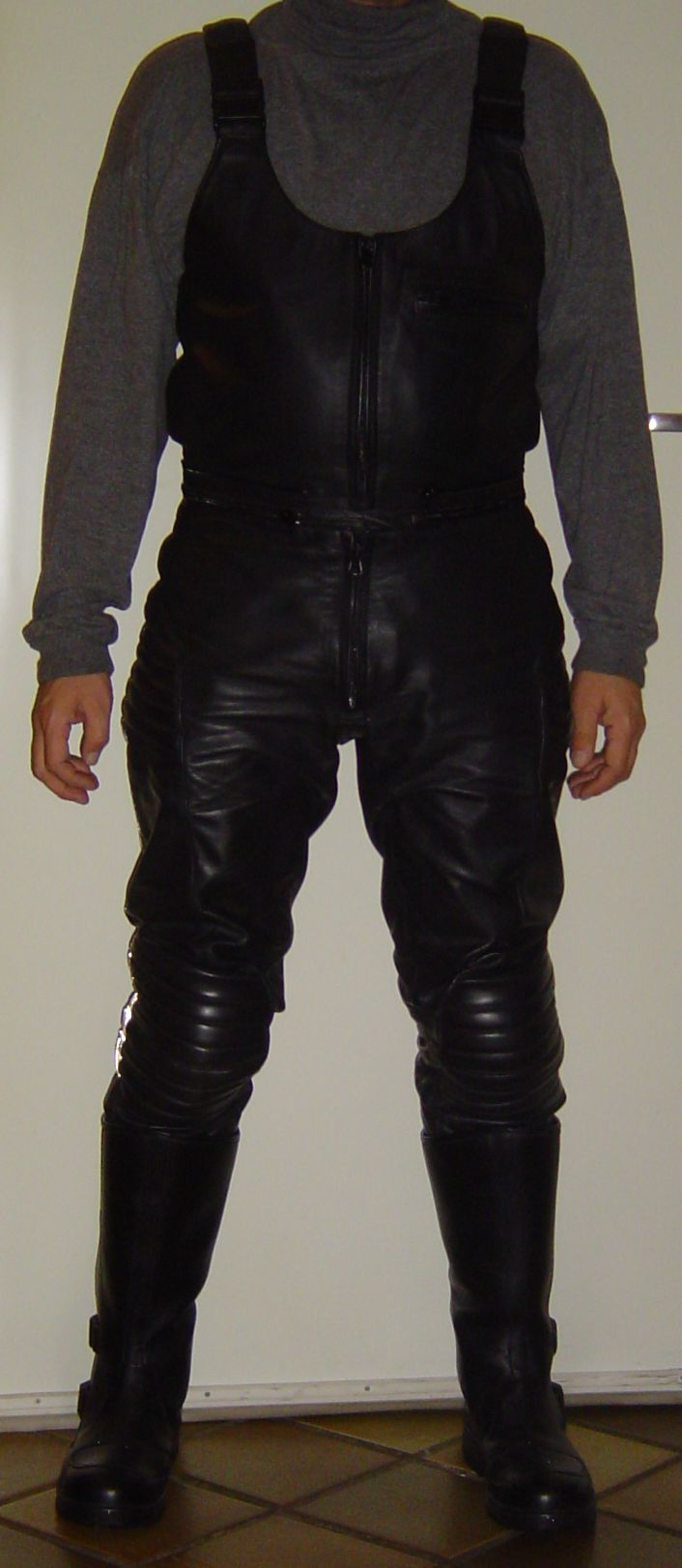
Salopettes for a motorcycle rider

Shortalls (a contraction of the words "short" and "overalls") are with the lower part adapted into shorts.

Salopettes is the French word for bib-and-brace overalls. The word is used in English for a similar garment to overalls worn for sailing, skiing, diving, and other heavy-duty activities. They are made of wind-and-waterproof trousers, traditionally with a high waist reaching to the chest and held up by adjustable shoulder braces.

Historically, military "overalls" were loose garments worn in the 18th and early 19th centuries over soldiers' breeches and gaiters when on active service or in barracks. After 1823, the term was replaced by "trousers" in British Army documents, but it survives to the present day in reference to the tight-fitting garments strapped under the instep, worn as part of the mess dress and full dress uniforms of cavalry regiments.
