= Swarm Gallery =

Swarm Gallery was an art gallery located in the Jack London Square neighborhood of Oakland, California in the United States. Swarm, which opened in 2006 and closed in 2013, exhibited contemporary art and was owned by Svea Lin Soll. It focused on the work of San Francisco Bay Area artists, but not exclusively. It had an entire gallery space devoted to installation art. Swarm featured contemporary work by emerging and established artists through exhibitions, flat files, studio space and programs, and was an experimental platform for sound, video, and installation-based work. Over the span of seven and a half years, Swarm Gallery presented over 70 exhibitions with some of the Bay Area's most beloved artists, provided 11 on-site rentals studios to more than 40 artists, and hosted hundreds of events and musical programs. The gallery participated in Art Murmur. In 2011, it was voted "Best Art Gallery" in the Readers' Poll in the East Bay Express Best of the East Bay.
