= Energy Recovery =

U.S. based manufacturer of energy recovery devices

Energy Recovery Inc.
- Type: Public
- Traded as: Nasdaq: ERII; Russell 2000 Component
- Industry: Desalination, wastewater treatment
- Founded: 1992; 34 years ago
- Founder: Leif Hauge
- Headquarters: San Leandro, California
- Number of locations: 3
- Area served: Worldwide
- Key people: David Moon (CEO)
- Products: PX Pressure Exchanger
- Revenue: $128,349,000▲ (2023)
- Total assets: $252,974,000▲ (2023)
- Total equity: $219,808,000▲ (2023)
- Number of employees: 269 (2023)
- Website: energyrecovery.com

Energy Recovery Inc. is an American manufacturer of energy recovery devices in the water industry.

== History ==
Energy Recovery was founded in 1992 by Leif and Marissa Hauge and incorporated in Virginia. The company was reincorporated in Delaware in 2001. Energy Recovery began selling its PX pressure exchanger products for seawater reverse osmosis (SWRO) desalination applications in 1997 and went public in 2008. It has since expanded its product offerings to include a variety of pressure exchangers operating at multiple pressure ranges for desalination and wastewater treatment.

The company is currently led by David Moon, President and Chief Executive Officer.

== Products ==
=== PX Pressure Exchanger ===
The PX Pressure Exchanger device is Energy Recovery's flagship product used in desalination. The Pressure Exchanger's technology utilizes pressure energy to reduce electricity and maintenance costs. The device collides two fluid flows, transferring the energy from one fluid to the next. This energy transfer occurs in a fraction of a second, reducing the interaction between the two fluids. Energy Recovery developed pressure exchanger products for specific applications, including its PX® Pressure Exchanger® such as the U-Series for Ultra High-Pressure Reverse Osmosis (UHPRO) applications in wastewater treatment.

Energy Recovery holds a majority market share in the desalination industry. There are more than 35,000 Pressure Exchangers supplied in more than 100 countries worldwide. The company's technologies have cut more than 14 billion kWh of energy each year and produced more than 12 billion liters of clean water daily.
