= Swagg Man =

French rapper

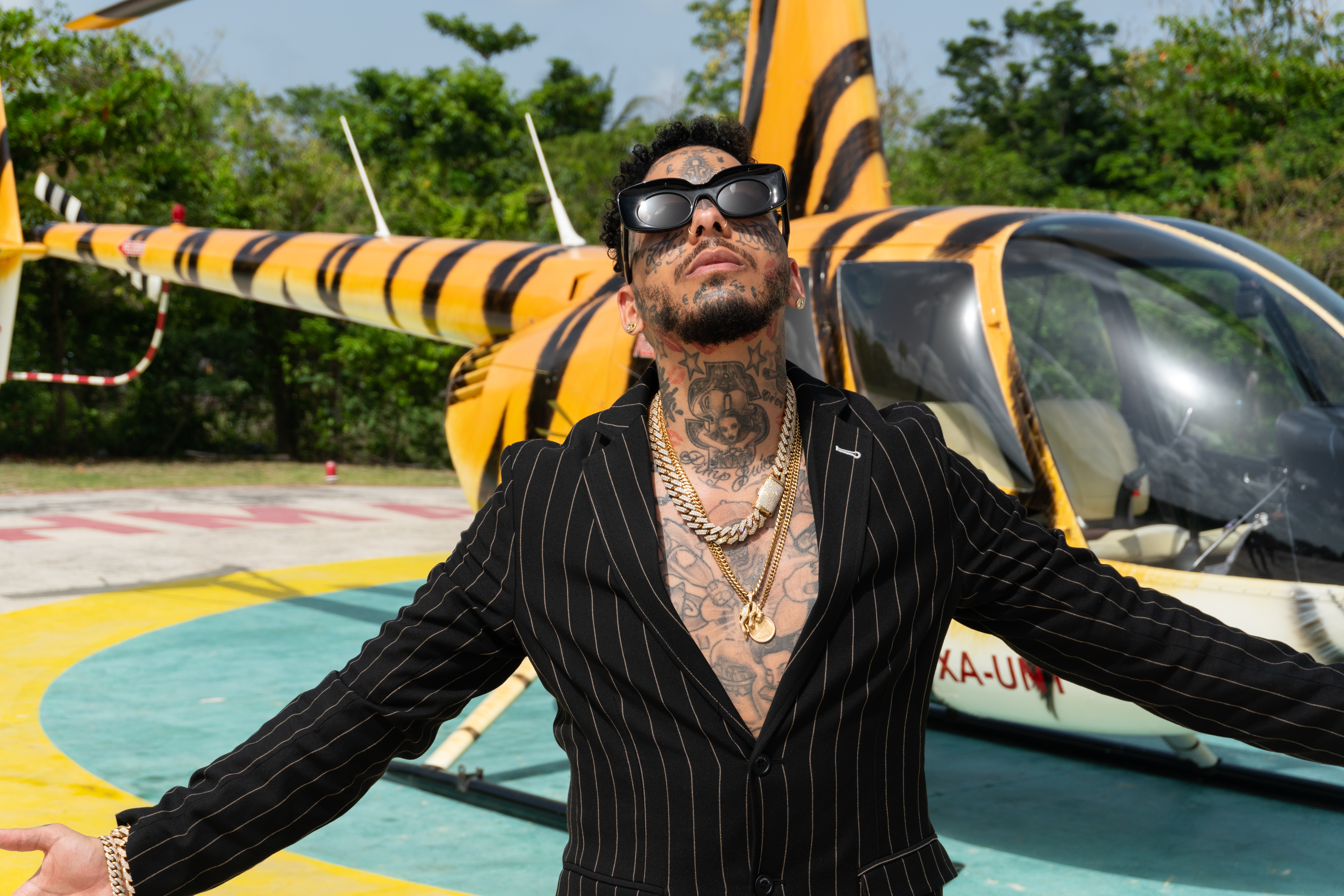
Swagg Man

Iteb Zaibet (born 23 December 1988), better known as his stage name Swagg Man, is a French (Note: He renounced his Tunisian citizenship in February 2023.) rapper and personality from Paris.

== Biography ==
Born of Tunisian immigrants, Iteb is the second of twelve children.

He posted his first YouTube video under the name Swagg Man on 21 August 2009.

Swagg Man released a rap album titled Swagg Man Posey on 27 June 2014 in France. He currently lives in Miami, Florida. He has the Louis Vuitton logo tattooed on his head. His single "Billey" charted at #189 in Singles Fusionnes for the 20th week of 2014 on the French Singles Chart. The song accompanied by a music video gained media attention throughout France. Swagg Man was featured in a French article for the single for Vice.

In February 2023, Swagg Man was sentenced to twenty years in prison in Tunisia after being found guilty of twenty counts of fraud. He subsequently expressed his intention to appeal the decision, and publicly renounced his Tunisian citizenship.

== Discography ==
=== Albums ===
Year	Album	Peak positions	
Year	Album	BEL (Wa)	FRA
2014	Swagg Man Posey	–	–
2015	MST	165	179

=== Singles ===
Year	Album	Peak positions	
Year	Album	BEL (Wa)	FRA
2014	"Billey"	–	189
2014	"Ma Bentley"	–	182
2014	"Savent-ils"	–	199

Other releases

- "Hotel"
- "F****n Tonight"
- "Black Card"
- "Suicidey"
- "J'ai pas le temps"
- "Avortey"
- "Posey"
- "Kiffey"
- "Get Money"
- "Lambo"
- "Tu Es Fan"
- "Impressionnant"
- "Crois En Tes Rêves"
- "Candy Girl"
- "Siliconey"
- "La Cess"
- "Favela"
