= Rosendin Electric =

American electrical contractor

- Company type: Private
- Industry: Construction
- Founded: 1919
- Founder: Moses Rosendin
- Headquarters: San Jose, California, San Jose, California, United States
- Number of locations: AZ (Tempe, Phoenix); CA (Anaheim, Concord, Los Angeles, Sacramento, San Francisco, San Jose); HI (Aiea); MD (Hanover); ID (Boise); NC (Huntersville); NV (Reno, Las Vegas); OR (Hillsboro, Prineville); TN (Gallatin); TX (Austin, Coppell, Pflugerville); VA (Richmond, Sterling)
- Key people: Keith Douglas, CEO; Paolo Degrassi, President; Justin Tinoco, President Hank Brasch, CAO; Matthew Hisaka, CFO
- Revenue: US$5.6 Billion
- Owner: Employee Owned
- Number of employees: 12,000+
- Website: rosendin.com
- Footnotes / references INC, Rosendin (2019, January). Rosendin History. Rosendin Electric.

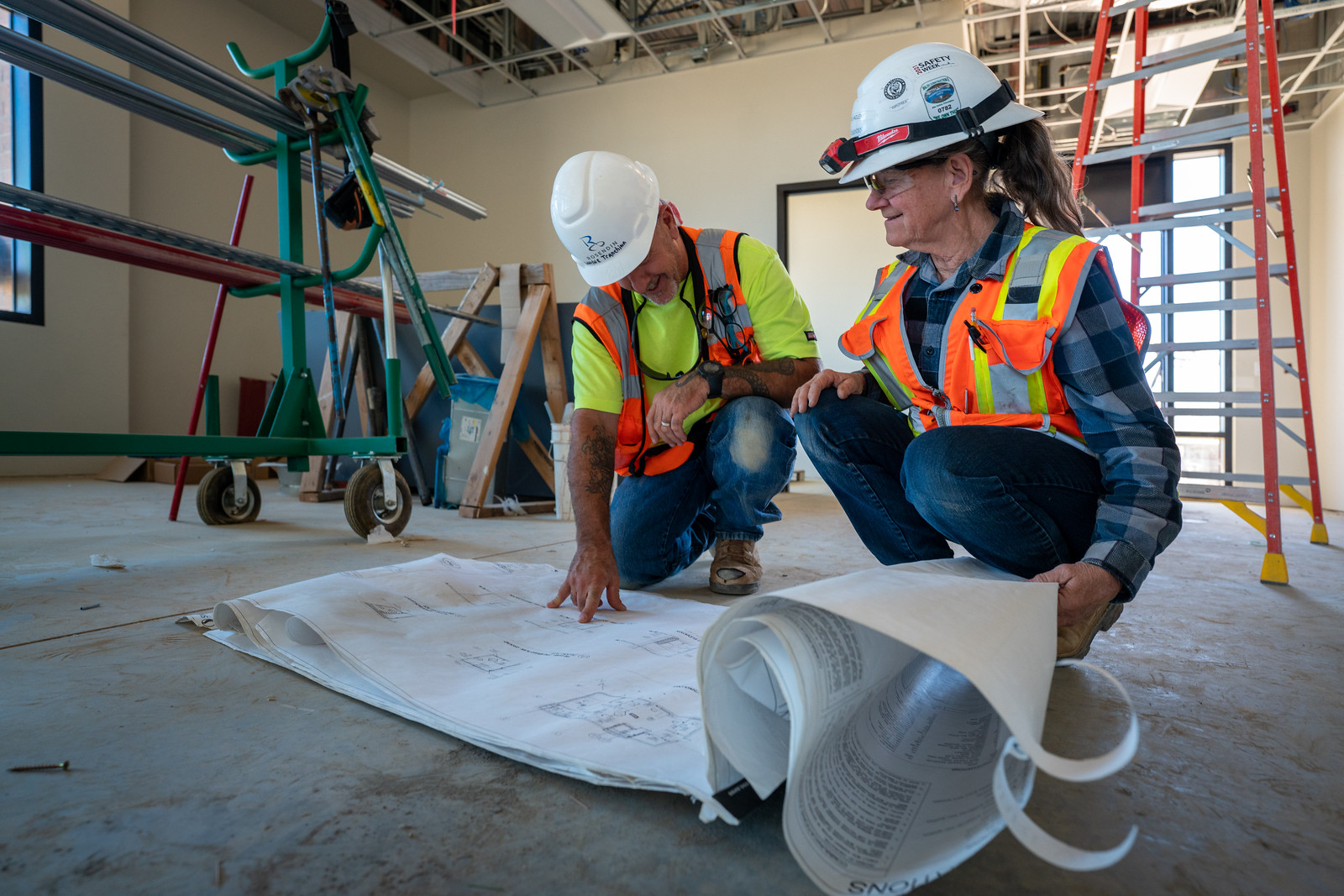
Craft workers at a Rosendin job site in Sacramento, California

Rosendin, headquartered in San Jose, is employee-owned and one of the largest electrical contractors in the United States, employing over 12,000 people with an average annual revenue of $5.6 billion. Established in 1919.

Offices are located in Arizona (Tempe, Phoenix); California (Anaheim, Concord, Los Angeles, Sacramento, San Francisco, San Jose); Hawaii (Aiea); Maryland (Hanover); Idaho (Boise); North Carolina (Huntersville); Nevada (Reno, Las Vegas); Oregon (Hillsboro, Prineville); Tennessee (Gallatin); Texas (Austin, Coppell, Pflugerville); Virginia (Richmond, Sterling).

== Employee Stock Ownership ==
In 1992, the Rosendin family made the decision to sell the company to the employees of Rosendin. By 2000, the sale was complete and Rosendin's employees owned 100% of the company, creating an ESOP (Employee Stock Ownership Plan).

== History ==
In 1919, Woodrow Wilson was President of the United States, the average house sold for under $4,000, and Moses Rosendin, a World War I veteran and immigrant from Mexico, began Rosendin Electric Motor Works by wiring the first irrigation pumps in the vast, fruit-laden "Valley of Heart's Delight", now known as Silicon Valley (INC, Rosendin, Rosendin History 2019). After the rapid growth of the 1920s, the stock market crashed in 1929; that was also the year Moses and Martha's first son, Ray, was born, and a few years later, their second son, Louis. "My father had a small metal building behind our house and a basement where the accounting was done. My mother worked on the books. So that's my beginning of family life", Louis Rosendin recalls his beginnings (INC, Rosendin, Rosendin 100th Anniversary 2020).

During World War II, Moses Rosendin expanded his business to accept contracts from the shipyards that sprang to life around the San Francisco Bay Area as he felt it was his duty as a United States citizen to help the country the best way he knew how (INC, Rosendin, Rosendin 100th Anniversary 2020). The end of World War II brought rapid commercial and industrial growth to the Santa Clara Valley and enormously expanded work for Rosendin. The company grew from eight employees in the late 1930s to ninety by the late 1950s (INC, Rosendin, Rosendin History 2019).

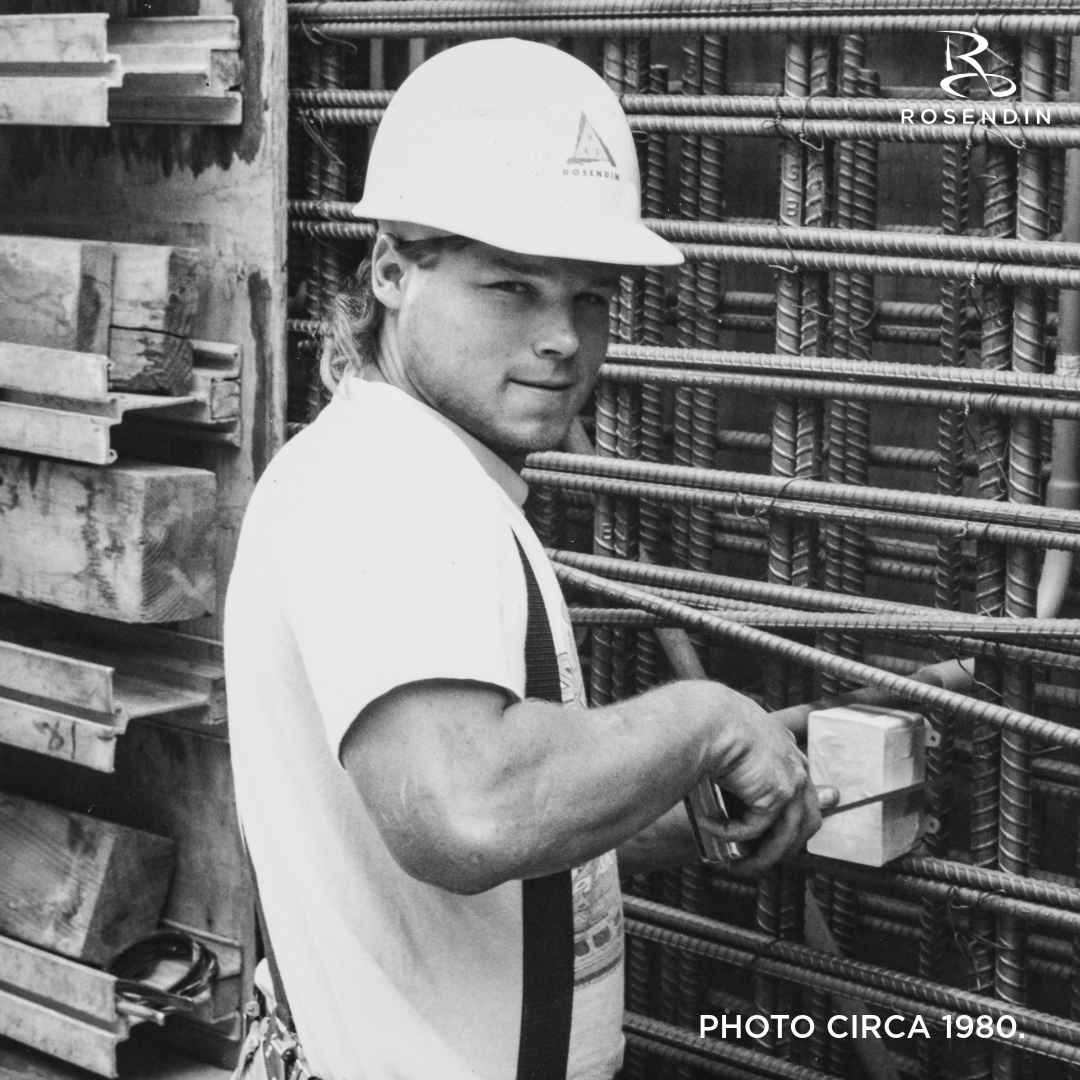
A Rosendin employee actively working on a construction site job in the 1980s

After three decades of growth, adversity, war efforts, and a booming economy like never before, Moses Rosendin fell ill. He could not return to work, so the business transferred ownership to his sons, Ray Rosendin (24 years old) and Louis Rosendin (21 years old) (INC, Rosendin, Rosendin 100th Anniversary 2020). "The men and women who worked together with us during this difficult period, giving their advice and support, I hold in the highest esteem, having a debt of gratitude for the advice, service, and commitment they gave to me and my brother, and the company," Ray Rosendin recalls the transition of ownership from his father to him and his brother (INC, Rosendin, Rosendin 100th Anniversary 2020). In 1953, Rosendin won their first million-dollar project: Fresno State College, signaling growth for the organization.

In the 1970s and 1980s, Rosendin began doing more significant work, such as malls, department stores, high-rise buildings, and large-scale projects, building its reputation in central California (INC, Rosendin, Rosendin 100th Anniversary 2020). In 1989, the 6.9-magnitude Loma Prieta earthquake hit the California Bay area, causing significant damage to the San Francisco–Oakland Bay Bridge (INC, Rosendin, Rosendin History 2019). The section of the bridge that collapsed landed on a transformer below, and Rosendin assisted in getting the bridge back to operational status and took that transformer, lowered it to a barge, and craned in a new transformer (INC, Rosendin, Rosendin 100th Anniversary 2020). The bridge was opened in time for Thanksgiving weekend.

In the late 1970s, Ray Rosendin began planning an exit strategy for himself and his brother to leave a thriving company in place. At this time, the Rosendin family decided to sell the company to the employees, making Rosendin an employee-owned company (INC, Rosendin, Rosendin 100th Anniversary 2020). Initially, the plan was to have the company fully transition to an ESOP in 2015, but Rosendin employees were so motivated and inspired that the transaction took place in 2000 (INC, Rosendin, Rosendin History 2019). During this time, Rosendin saw a shift in their culture. This gradual change led to a shared sense of ownership, creating a lot of excitement and more pride in what the organization has accomplished (INC, Rosendin, Rosendin 100th Anniversary 2020). Rosendin's work became more diversified taking on more projects in various sectors (INC, Rosendin, Rosendin 100th Anniversary 2020). Rosendin had seen success with wind farms, started building data centers, and performed much more design-build work. Rosendin's employees took on an ownership mindset, creating even more success for the organization (INC, Rosendin, Rosendin 100th Anniversary 2020).

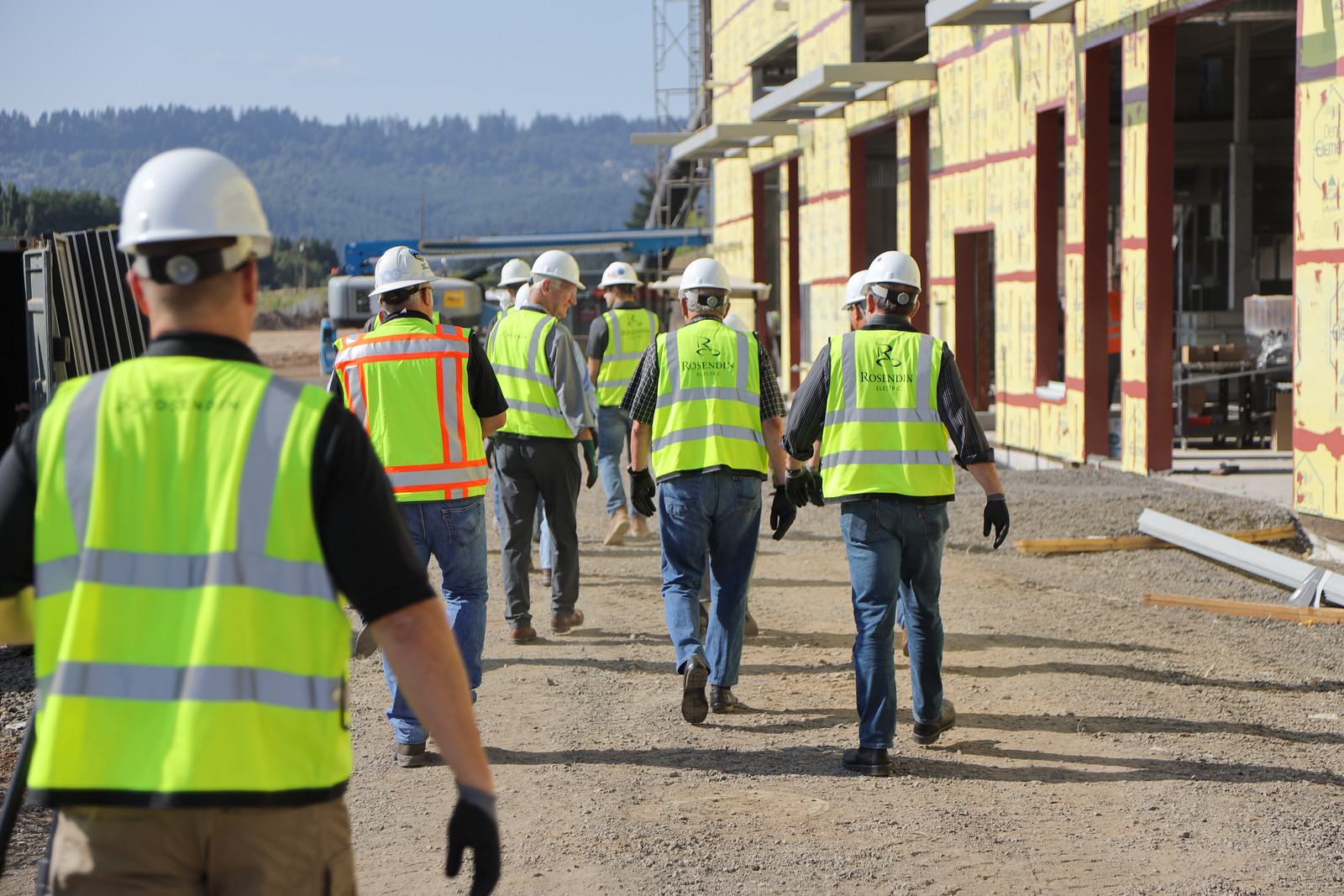
Rosendin employees taking a tour of an active job site in Oregon

Rosendin now has a nationwide footprint with 12,000+ employees working across 23+ offices and a wide diversity of work from high-tech to renewables to data centers and healthcare.
