= Verve Coffee Roasters =

Coffee roaster based in California, United States

Coordinates: 36.9640°N 121.9647°W

- Interactive map of Verve Coffee Roasters

Restaurant information
- Established: 2007; 19 years ago
- Owners: Colby Barr, Ryan O'Donovan
- Location: Santa Cruz, California
- Website: vervecoffee.com

Verve Coffee Roasters is a coffee roaster based in Santa Cruz, California, founded by Colby Barr and Ryan O'Donovan. Verve opened in November, 2007 in Pleasure Point, California. The company currently operates in several California-based locations, including four in Santa Cruz, four in Los Angeles, one in San Francisco, one in Manhattan Beach, one in Palo Alto, and two in Menlo Park at the campuses of Meta and SLAC. They also have seven locations in Japan: five in Tokyo, including the Shinjuku train station, as well as one in Kamakura and a cafe/roastery in the Kanagawa Prefecture. Verve earned the highest score in the coffee category at the Good Food Awards in 2013 and was also named one of the top coffee roasters in the United States by Thrillist, Complex Magazine, and Food Republic In 2018, they won the Best Espresso at the Coffee Spot Awards, and in 2021 be nominated for the cafe in Japan at the World Latitude Caffe Prize.

In 2024, Verve was selected as Macro Roaster of the Year by Roast Magazine, noting the company's innovations in sustainability, ethical growth, and positive employee culture.
