= People Power Company =

American technology company

People Power Co.
- Type: Private
- Industry: Technology; Internet of Things
- Founded: 2009
- Founder: Gene Wang (CEO); David Moss (CTO)
- Headquarters: Palo Alto, CA, U.S.
- Area served: Global
- Products: Mobile apps; Cloud-based software
- Website: Official Website

The People Power Company (or simply, People Power) is an American technology company and software and mobile app creator headquartered in Silicon Valley. It is noted as the creator of the "Presence" app, which allows unused smart phones and tablets to be turned into home monitoring devices and energy efficiency tools. Their products are commonly based on "Internet of Things" (IoT) concepts and methodologies.

People Power Company's IoT services include:

- China Mobile, with more than 6 million subscribers
- BGE (Baltimore Gas and Electric)
- PepCo used in over 600 homes
- DelMarva used in over 1,000 homes

== History ==
The People Power Company was founded by Gene Wang (CEO) and David Moss (CTO) in Palo Alto, California in January 2009 and officially launched in November 2009. Wang and Moss had previously worked at Bitfone, which was acquired by Hewlett-Packard. People Power was initially envisioned as a greentech company with a focus on energy efficiency.

In 2013, the company released its "Presence" app, which is designed to turn older smartphones and tablets into home monitoring devices and sensors using the device's built-in camera. The Presence app also allows users to monitor and control third-party internet-connected appliances and electrical usage in their homes. The app was originally available for iPad, iPhone, and iPod Touch devices. In mid-2013, the company's Chief Scientist, John Teeter, was selected as a Presidential Innovation Fellow and worked at the National Institute of Standards and Technology (NIST). He would go on to work on the Green Button Initiative, which is a program designed to allow home energy customers to access and download their energy usage data.

In 2014, People Power began energy efficiency pilot programs in Cape Cod and Oahu. These pilot programs provided a certain number of homes with the Presence app and several free "SmartPlugs," which were created by Monster Cable and can be connected to and controlled via Wi-Fi. In Hawaii, the results of the pilot program showed that homes could reduce their energy usage by about 10% per month.

In September 2015, People Power received $4.4 million in a series B funding round led by MediaTek, bringing its total funding to $12 million. People Power also has a company band (the People Power Band) that plays a mix of covers and original songs. The band, which features Gene Wang on saxophone and David Moss on trumpet, has played at numerous "green" events and conferences including Earth Day SF and Earth Day on the National Mall in Washington, D.C. The band has released two albums: Green Bandwagon and, in 2015, Powered Up.

== Products ==
People Power's most notable product is Presence, a home security and energy management app that can be utilized on otherwise unused iPad, iPhone, iPod Touch, and Android devices through a Wi-Fi connection. The app was envisioned after co-founder Gene Wang's mother's home was burglarized. The goal of an earlier version of the app was to provide users with the ability to monitor and control energy usage. Both the security and the energy management functions are included in the app. The app starts recording video and/or audio when movement is detected, and users can program the app to send a video clip of the movement to their current smartphone. The app has also been used for home monitoring purposes (including as a baby monitor).

The Presence app also allows users to control third-party internet-connected products and appliances remotely. Users can create "if-this-then-that" rules to control energy usage in their homes. For example, they can set specific times for certain smart plugs to stay on or off. They can also manage things like the thermostat and appliances. The app informs the user how much electricity a certain plug is using at any given time.

== Recognition and awards ==
In 2017, People Power was named in Gartner's annual "Cool Vendors in Connected Home, 2017" report that identifies technology vendors with innovative products and services that have genuine market impact. In 2015, the Software and Information Industry Association awarded People Power with the Most Innovative and Overall NextGen Award in the "Mobile technology" category. Also in 2015, the company was awarded the 2015 Energy Award for Outstanding Achievement in Energy Efficient Technology Deployment by the Association of Energy Services Professionals (AESP). In 2012, the company won AT&T's "Power the Future" award at CES 2012. In 2011, Gigaom named People Power one of the "10 Greentech Companies to Watch in 2011." In 2010, the company won a GE Ecomagination Challenge Award.
