= Title Nine (clothing) =

American manufacturer of athletic clothing and women's workout clothes

Title 9 Sports, Inc.
- Founded: 1989; 37 years ago in Berkeley, California
- Founder: Missy Park
- Headquarters: 6201 Doyle Street; Emeryville, CA 94608
- Products: Sports bras; Sportswear; Athleisure
- Website: www.titlenine.com

Title Nine is an American manufacturer of athletic clothing and women’s workout clothes, known for its sports bras and fitting services. It is the largest independently-owned and operated retailer of women's fitness clothing. In 2020 they had twenty retail stores primarily on the West Coast and the Midwest. The name is an example of a trend in organizations' naming themselves after sections of treaties and law, something that Zachary Elkins has called "chapter-verse branding."

The company was founded in 1989 by Lillian "Missy" Park who was an early beneficiary of Title IX, playing basketball at Yale University. Park, born in 1962, was the first generation of young women to go through high school and college after Title IX had passed. She had to play most of her college career in men's shorts and basketball shoes which were uncomfortable and didn't fit right. She decided to start a place where women could find workout gear that was comfortable.

Title Nine began as a mail order company in the Bay Area. It is run by female executives and largely staffed by female athletes. The models in their catalogs are primarily actual female athletes. While the site is known for their sports bras, they also sell athletic equipment such as hockey gear, batting helmets and bicycles that are made for women and girls. The company was profitable for the first time in 1993 and launched their first website in 1995.

Title Nine helped produce Dandelion, an outdoors women's magazine and sponsors local activity groups and running races. The brand supports female business owners annually with a pitch competition where woman-owned brands compete to have their products sold online on Title Nine's store.

In July 2021, Park announced that the company would donate US $1 million to support the players of the U.S. Women's National Soccer Team in their equal pay dispute with US Soccer.
