= Fujitsu Computer Products of America =

American computer products company

Fujitsu Computer Products of America, Inc.
- Headquarters: Sunnyvale, California, United States
- Number of employees: more than 150
- Website: http://www.fujitsu.com/us/about/platforms/fcpa/

Fujitsu Computer Products of America, Inc. is a subsidiary of Fujitsu Limited, the world's third largest IT products and services provider. FCPA designs, develops, and manufactures innovative computer products for the global marketplace. Current product and service offerings include high-performance hard disk drives, scanners and scanner maintenance, palm vein recognition technology, and 10Gb Ethernet switches and degaussers. FCPA is headquartered in Sunnyvale, California, United States. The company is responsible for design and development, distribution, sales and marketing, finance and administration, and engineering and technical support for the Fujitsu document imaging scanner business and computing and storage products.

The company claims to have a "55 percent market share in the U.S. of the 20-to-49-pages-per-minute, high-performance scanner market."

== List of FCPA product groups ==
- ScanSnap scanners
- Workgroup scanners
- Departmental scanners
- Production scanners
- Network scanners
- Enterprise Hard Drives
- Enterprise Networking
- Advanced Security Devices

Fujitsu sold its Enterprise Hard Disk Drive business to Toshiba as of October 1st, 2009.
