= St. Rose Hospital =

Hospital in Hayward, California, United States

- Alecto Healthcare Services

Geography
- Location: Hayward, Alameda County, California, United States
- Coordinates: 37.6333°N 122.08794°W

Organization
- Type: General

History
- Opened: 1962

Links
- Website: www.strosehospital.org
- Lists: Hospitals in California

St. Rose Hospital is an independent, non-profit hospital located in Hayward, California. It is a designated cardiac arrest receiving center in the Alameda County emergency medical services system, and provides basic emergency medical services.

== History ==
The hospital opened in 1962. It has dedicated itself to treating some of the poorest and sickest patients of the East Bay since its inception. In 2012 it was nearly bankrupt but was bailed out with $12 million from the county of Alameda, Kaiser Permanente, and others. With Kaiser Hayward planning a relocation to San Leandro, St. Rose will be the only hospital in the city. The hospital considered plans to either be taken over by Alameda County Medical Center, or Lex Reddy, formerly with the embattled Prime Healthcare Services, and the brother-in-law of Prem Reddy. Reddy's firm, Alecto Healthcare Services, began managing St. Rose in 2013.

On June 11, 2020, a COVID-19 outbreak was reported at the hospital infecting 37 healthcare workers.
