= Sugar Bowl Bakery =

Bakery in Hayward, California

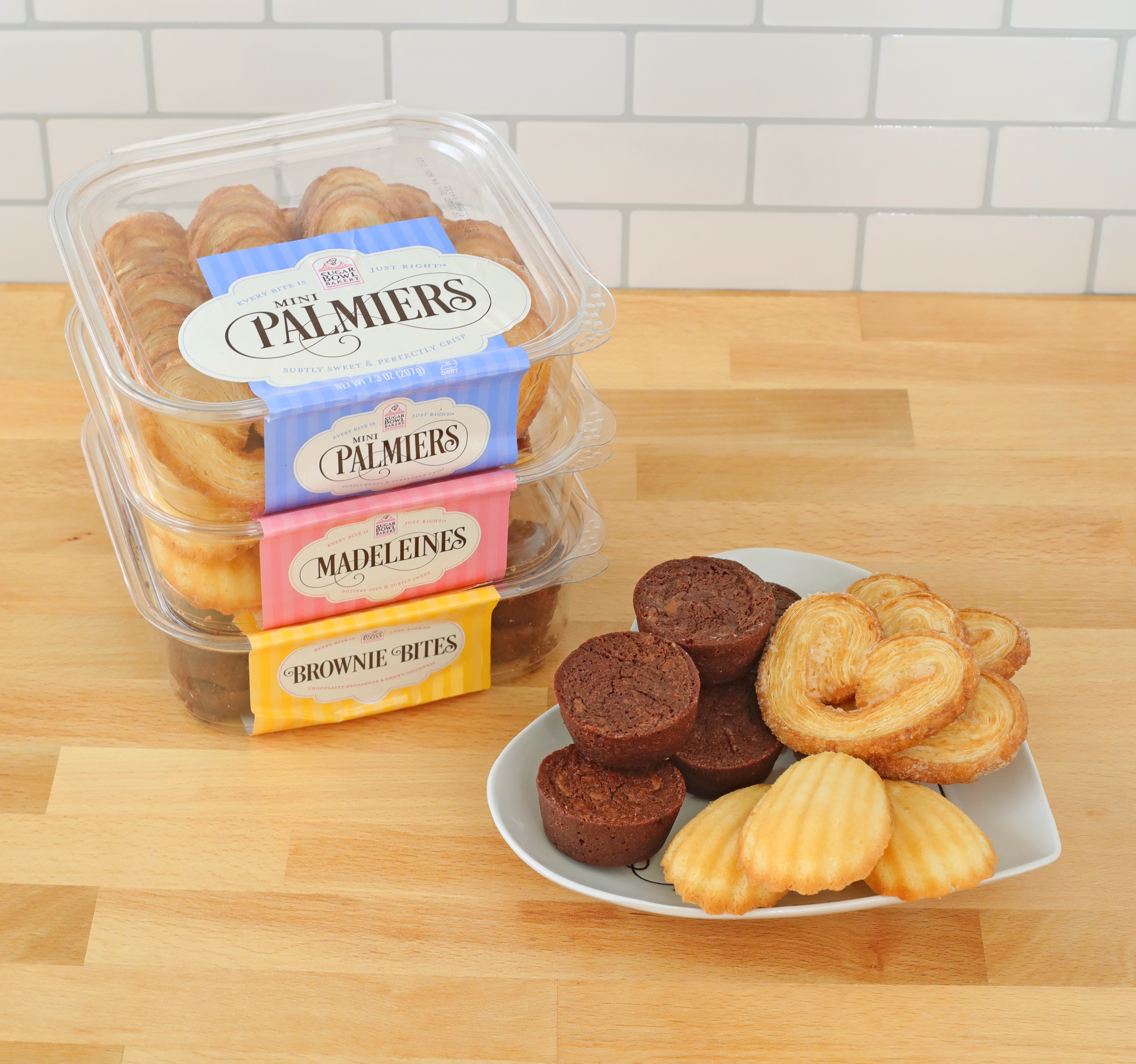
Palmiers and brownies made by Sugar Bowl Bakery

Sugar Bowl Bakery is a bakery based in Hayward, California. It is one of the largest food production companies in the San Francisco Bay Area. The company was founded in 1984, when Vietnamese immigrant Andrew Ly and his four brothers bought a San Francisco donut shop. In addition to retail products, the company serves hotels, and Costco, and has an extensive production and distribution capacity in the Northern California region. The bakery has been praised by President Barack Obama as an example of a successful immigration story, saying "[This is] what America is about ... the place where you can reach for something better if you work hard."
