= Ron Simms =

American custom motorcycle builder

- Occupation: custom motorcycle building

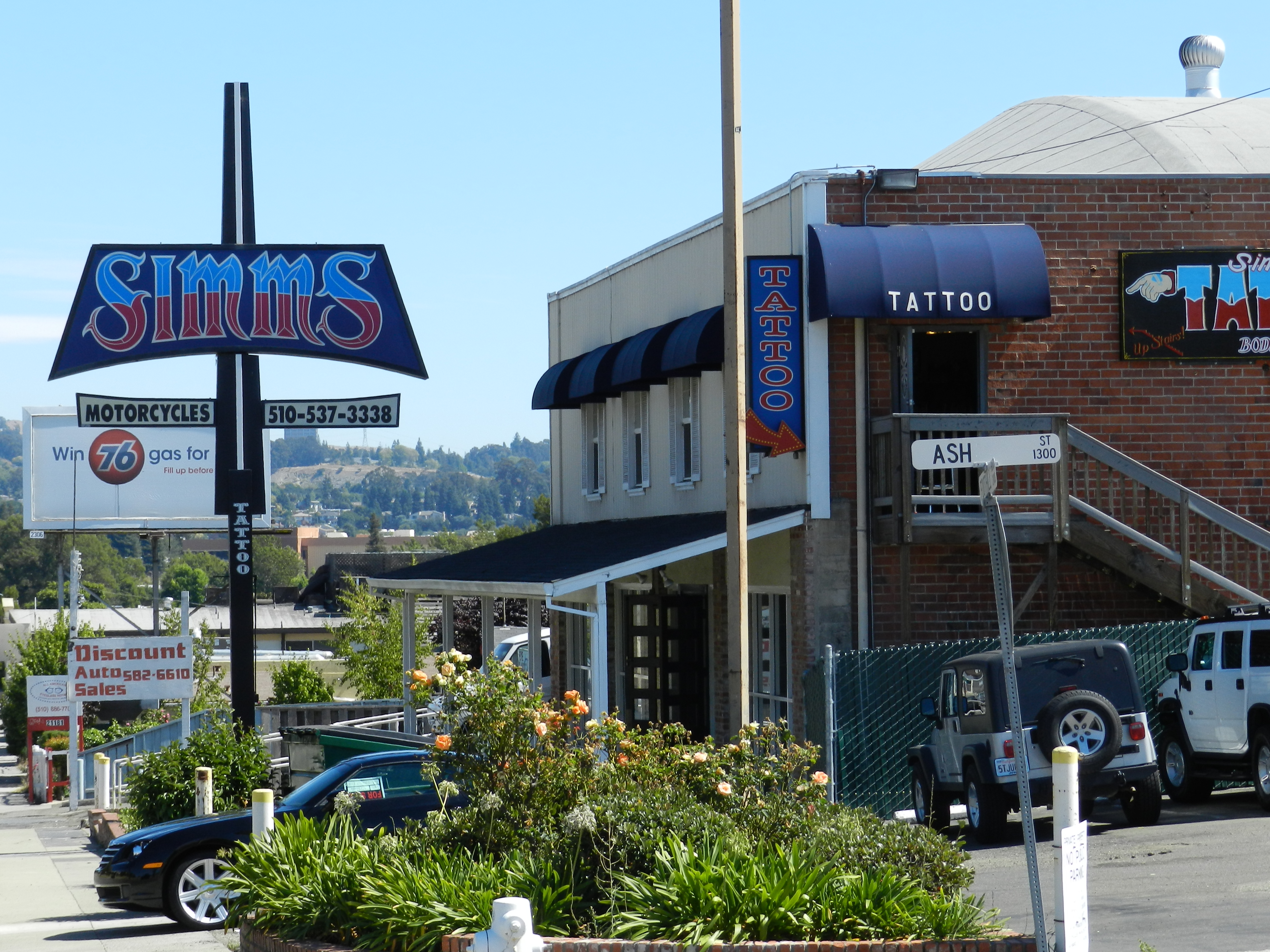
Simms Custom Cycles

Ron Simms is an American custom motorcycle builder, operating his business, Simms Custom Cycles, in Hayward, California. Simms has been building custom motorcycles for over 47 years. He has been featured in Easyriders magazine, and the photo essay book Art of the Chopper, where his work was compared to Arlen Ness as epitomizing the East Bay Style. In 2017 appeared in American M.C. Season 1 episode 1. Jesse James of West Coast Choppers apprenticed under Ron Simms.

== Awards ==
- Best Performance Machine Equipped Bike, 2009 Los Angeles Calendar Bike Show
