= Signature BioScience =

- Type: Private
- Industry: BioPharmaceutical Discovery and Development
- Founded: 1998
- Defunct: 2003
- Headquarters: San Francisco (initially Richmond), USA
- Key people: Mark McDade who was succeeded by Robert J. Zimmerman
- Number of employees: approximately 100

Signature BioScience Inc. was the first biotechnology company based in San Francisco. It was formed in 1998 but closed in 2003 due to lack of funding. Before Signature was dissolved, it had just completed Phase II trials on Digitoxin, which the company was pursuing as an anti-cancer compound. However, the company's core competency was developing biotechnology tools that would be used to identify highly qualified pre-clinical leads.

== History ==
=== Timeline ===
Signature BioScience (Signature) was founded by John Hefti, a theoretical physicist who received his doctorate from UC Berkeley and studied medicine at Stanford. Signature’s main business model was to become a drug development company with preclinical leads available for licensing to pharmaceutical and biotech partners. Their main focus area was cancer, although they were in the process of developing some compounds in other therapeutic areas. Andrew Sandham later became president of the company and John Hefti became the CTO, with Mark McDade taking over as the CEO in late 2000. Towards the end of 2002, Robert J. Zimmerman succeeded Mark McDade, who left Signature to go to Protein Design Labs. Zimmerman became the President and a member of the Board of Directors, while maintaining his position as the COO; he had also formerly held the positions of EVP of Research & Development at Signature.

From January 1999 to February 2000, Dr. Amit Kumar was the founding President and Chief Executive Officer of Signature BioSciences Inc. Dr. Kumar did his graduate studies at Stanford University and the California Institute of Technology and received his Ph.D. from Caltech in chemistry in 1991. Later, he did is post-doctoral fellowship at Harvard University, where he developed patented techniques for building biochips and related devices. Furthermore, he had a great deal of experience working in the biotech industry and developing company’s platform technologies. In November 2000, Mark McDade succeeded Dr. Kumar as the CEO. Mark McDade was the co-founder of Corixa in September 1994, had served on Corixa’s board since March 1999 and as the chief operating officer and director since 1994.

Signature became the first biotechnology company in San Francisco after acquiring 67,000 square feet (6,200 m^{2}) of office and space in the city. They signed a 10-year lease in October 2001. Before all the employees and equipment moved into the new facility in May 2002, Signature increased its lease space to 100,000 square feet. In April 2003, Signature decided to cease all operations when investors decided not to give the company a $10 million bridge loan. This loan was supposed to be used until the company completed a $30 million private equity from S.G. Capital Partners.

== Technology and products ==
Signature’s called its drug discovery platform, WaveScreen, could evaluate both cellular and molecular responses to compounds at the beginning of the drug discovery process. It used the technology itself and with partners, and commercialized instrumentation to implement it via a partnership with MDS Sciex.

Signature also developed a cellular detection system based on its proprietary multipole coupling spectroscopy (MCS) technology which was based upon dielectric spectroscopy and used microwave and radio frequencies to scan proteins and cells.

== Financing ==
After leaving his work at Stanford and filing a patent, John Hefti raised $1 million in funding from Prospect Venture Partners (PVP) and Abingworth Management Inc. In September 2000, Signature raised $17 million in a Series C private funding, which was led by Atlas Venture, and included CIBC Capital Partners and Coral Ventures as well as the company's original investors, ProspectVenture Partners and Abingworth Management. In July 2001, Signature raised $43 million in a 4th round (Series D) of financing. The fund was led by SG Capital Partners, with the other existing investors participating in the round including PVP, Atlas Venture, Abinworth Management, CIBC Capital Partners, and Coral Ventures. The new investors in this round included SG Capital Partners, Vulcan Ventures Inc., MDS Capital Corp, China Development Industrial Bank, Tallwood Venture Capital, Lehman Brothers, Lotus Bioscience Ventures Ltd., and IRR. At this point, the company had raised a total of $64 million since its beginning in 1998. Signature had assumed that their revenues, which would include the fees from pharmaceutical device companies, would reach $10 million at the end of 2001 and expected the numbers to skyrocket to $100 million by 2004. However, the company dissolved after it failed to obtain a necessary bridge loan in 2003.
