= Sungevity =

American solar energy company

- Key people: Danny Kennedy — Co-Founder; Kyle Udseth; CEO
- Website: Sungevity.com

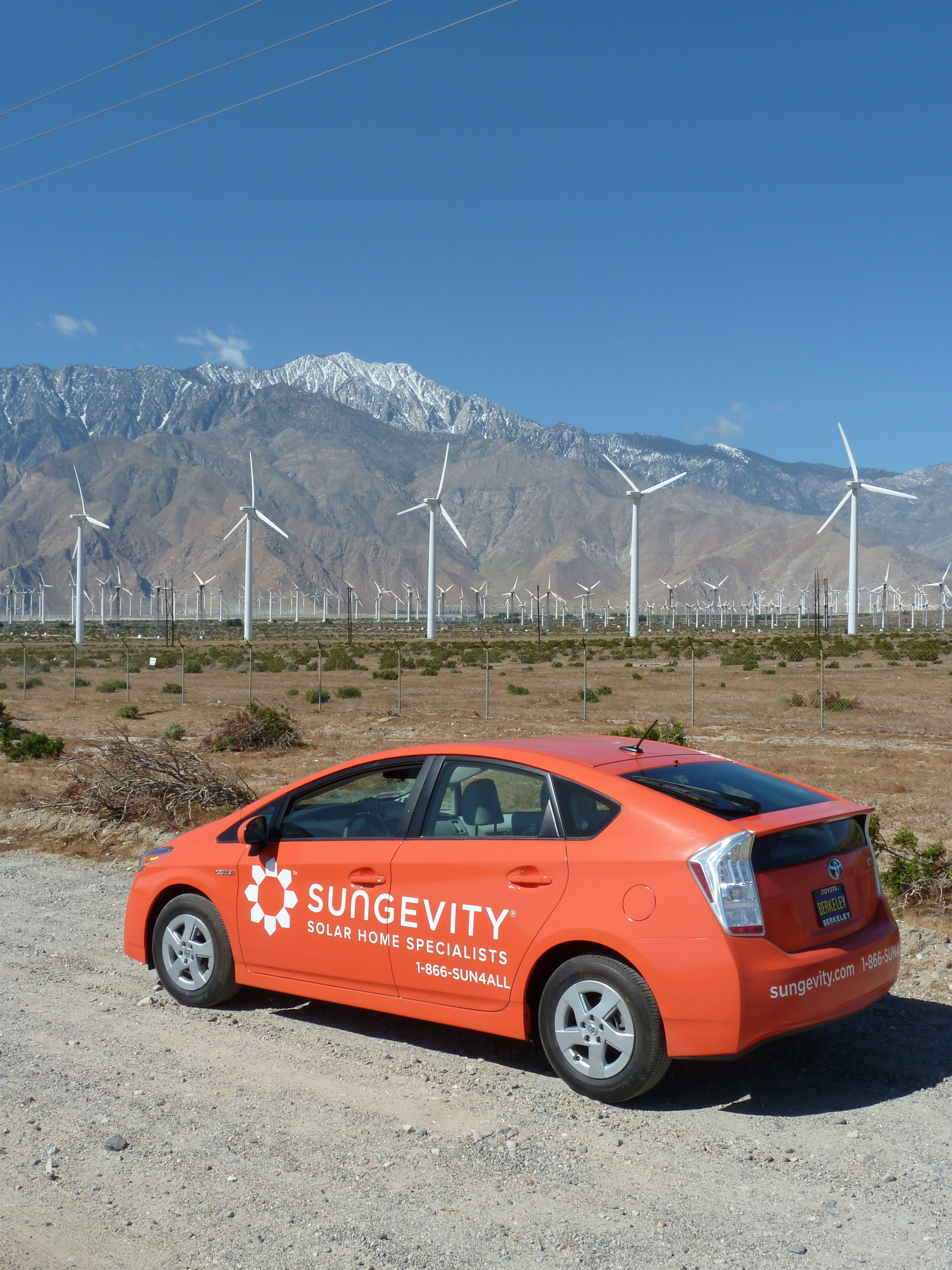
Sungevity electric car in Southern California

Sungevity is a solar electricity company based in Oakland, California. Founded in 2007, the company designs home solar systems; provides financing options; and manages system installation, maintenance, and performance.

Sungevity operates in the United States and Europe. Within the United States, it installed solar panels and solar systems in California, Colorado, Connecticut, Massachusetts, Maryland, New York, New Jersey, Rhode Island, Vermont, Delaware, and Washington D.C. In 2012, the company reported having more than 250 employees, but in 2017 it laid off almost all its staff and was sold to Northern Pacific Group.

In 2020, Sungevity's assets were acquired by Minnesota-based company Pineapple Energy, which resumed activity under the Sungevity name in California only.

== History ==
=== Founding ===
Sungevity was founded in 2007 by Danny Kennedy, Andrew Birch (CEO), and Alec Guettel. On September 22, 2009, the firm announced that it had raised $6 million to expand its services to Southern California and California's Central Valley. On May 1, 2010, Sungevity partnered with US Bank and launched its Solar Lease program.

In December 2010, the firm raised an additional $15 million toward its Series C funding round. In 2011, it worked with U.S. Bancorp, Rabobank, and Citigroup to fund residential solar installations. Also in 2011, Lowe's, the home-improvement retailer, purchased a stake in Sungevity. In April 2014, the firm raised $70 million in equity from investors including General Electric, Lowe's, Jetstream Ventures, and E.ON, Europe's largest investor-owned utility. On December 15, 2015, it announced its $600 million private equity funding by investors including GE Ventures as well as Apollo Investment Corporation.

In November 2011, the firm announced it was taking an equity stake in Dutch solar company Zonline. Sungevity was to provide Zonline with its proprietary software tools, including the company's Remote Solar Design services and brand-identity assets. In June 2014, Sungevity acquired Zonline and launched Sungevity Netherlands.

In April 2012, Sungevity and Australian solar company Nickel Energy announced a joint venture, called Sungevity Australia, that would provide Australian homeowners with their first pay-as-you-go solar option, which the company dubbed RoofJuice.

=== Layoffs and first acquisition ===
In January 2017 the company laid off senior and mid-level managers, and in March it laid off around 2/3 of its staff without notice, with sources at the company suggesting bankruptcy was imminent. The ex-employees filed a lawsuit seeking back pay for 60 days, a requirement under the Worker Adjustment and Retraining Notification Act. The company filed for Chapter 11 bankruptcy on March 14, 2017. In April, after laying off another 2/3 of its staff without severance pay, the remainder of the company was sold to private equity firm Northern Pacific Group for $50 million, who created a new company, Solar Spectrum, which acquired Sungevity's infrastructure, technology, installer network, supplier warranties, and certain agreements. Northern Pacific Group also acquired Sungevity's European businesses which were subsequently sold to French utility Engie. The now Engie owned European business operates under the name Sungevity International.

Sungevity laid off 400 people in March 2020 due to the COVID-19 pandemic.

In November 2020, Sungevity's companies Horizon Solar Power and Solar Spectrum, along with Sungevity, before Sungevity resumed operations under Pineapple Energy.

=== Pineapple Energy Acquisition ===
In 2021, Sungevity resumed operations under the umbrella of Pineapple Energy, which acquired its assets in 2020. Pineapple Energy is a U.S.-based operator and consolidator of residential solar, battery storage and grid services solutions, which is currently privately owned but will be merging with the publicly traded Communication Systems Inc., an IoT company.

== Awards and recognition ==
- 2009 Green Business Award
- Green Jobs Award 2011
- Planet Forward Innovator of the Year 2011

== See also ==
- Off-the-grid
