= Speak With A Geek =

American recruiting agency

- Type: Private company
- Industry: information technology
- Founded: San Diego, California, United States (1999)
- Defunct: 2018
- Headquarters: San Francisco, California, United States
- Services: Technical recruitment
- Website: speakwithageek.com

Speak With A Geek (SWAG) was an American technical recruiting agency headquartered in San Francisco, California. Speak With A Geek was a mobile app-based company that used a "peer to peer" model similar to Uber designed to connect IT technicians to freelance jobs and vice versa. SWAG claimed there were 3 million vetted users worldwide, but that number is unconfirmed. Speak With A Geek was available in the United States, Canada, Western Europe, and Asia.

== History ==
Speak With A Geek was launched on August 15, 1999 as an IT services company. By December of that year, 1,000 projects had been completed through Speak With A Geek. In early 2000, the company discontinued its in-home services, choosing to focus all resources on business services. By 2018 the company and its website were closed.

The early and mid-2000s included growth and key mentions of the company in the media. In 2002, Speak With A Geek was featured in The New York Times. By the end of that year, Speak With A Geek had been featured in more than 25 top daily newspapers reaching over 7 million readers. In 2003, the company reported 25% growth in client numbers. In 2004, Speak With A Geek introduced its services to five additional cities in the United States including San Francisco, CA, Woodside, CA, Tempe, AZ, Sarasota, FL, Grand Rapids, MI, Colorado Springs, CO, Silicon Roundabout, UK, Auckland, NZ.

In 2008, Speak With A Geek introduced third-party verification software to manage the certifications of its Geeks.

On July 15, 2015 the company launched SWAG, which gave businesses instant access to a large pool of vetted technical "Geeks". The Client App enabled users to hire Geeks for a full-time position within their company. SWAG used a mutual rating system to ensure both parties were vetted so that the quality of candidates and standards could remain high for everyone.

== Products and Services ==
In addition to its web platform, Speak With A Geek offered users access to the Speak With A Geek services through its iOS and Android mobile application. The mobile app was released on July 15, 2015. A monthly subscription was required to access the platform. While many calls and e-mail queries received by Speak With a Geek were about personal computers, holidays or seasonality sometimes affect call topics.

For Employers

Employers could access the Speak With A Geek talent pool via web or mobile application where they could post jobs and projects.

For Geeks

Technical candidates – or “Geeks” – were vetted through the Speak With A Geek platform. Geeks could undergo testing, perform code challenges, take part in video interviews, and/or join hackathons through the Speak With A Geek platform.

== In The Media ==
Speak With A Geek was listed as a Jupiter Media Metrix "Top Newcomer" for the Media Metrix U.S. Top 50 Web and digital media property ratings for April 2002 after SWAG's Official Website attracted more than 500,000 unique visitors for that month. The company was then featured by The New York Times in November 2002 in an article discussing the sharp rise in technical support requests around the holidays.

Speak With A Geek was also featured in Time Magazine in February 2004 as an affordable technical support provider and in PC Magazine in April 2004 in a paid support-services scorecard.

In 2010, Speak With A Geek was featured in "Using Information Technology 9th Edition: A Practical Introduction to Computers & Communications," an educational textbook used at a number of universities as part of the curriculum including at Lahore School of Economics. In 2010, There were multiple competitors that emerged into the contribution for why the company ran out of business. The companies included were "Dice." There was a huge change in technology evolution for why it the sudden jump. The media was the biggest disclose for why Speak with a Geek came to an end which is noticeable in the Mobile Tech Trends to Watch. With the evolution in technology mobile also endured in other medical practices as and economic differences on multiple scales like Vet Record. Speak with a Geek ended due to the evolution of technological advances.

== See also ==
- Diversity (business)
- Recruitment
- Technical support
