= Independent Iron Works =

Steel fabricator in California, 1920s–1950s

Coordinates: 37.8098°N 122.3033°W

Independent Iron Works (IIW) was an Oakland, California headquartered steel fabricator founded in the 1920s by William G. Meagher from Port Angeles, Washington, later co-owned with Henry F. Gede, of Oakland. Secondary facilities were located in Los Angeles, California.

== Contracts ==
Important contracts included girders for the James Lick Freeway in San Francisco, California, bridges along the Northern California Coast, and the Union Oil Building in Los Angeles, California.

== Legal contests ==
IIW took several legal contests with United States Steel and Bethlehem Steel to US Federal Court over completive practices.

== Sale ==
After a sale in 1958, the major facilities came under the ownership of Phoenix Iron Works. The latter firm's name can be found on many roadway manhole covers in California.
