= Otis Spunkmeyer =

Brand of baked goods

Coordinates: 37°41′39″N 122°10′14.8″W

Otis Spunkmeyer Inc.
- Type: Subsidiary
- Industry: Food processing
- Founded: 1977
- Headquarters: San Leandro, California, United States
- Products: Muffins, Cookies Danishes, Brownies, Pretzels, Bagels, Cinnamon Rolls.
- Revenue: ▲336.3 million USD (2005)
- Number of employees: 1,183 (2005)
- Parent: Aryzta
- Website: www.otisspunkmeyer.com

Otis Spunkmeyer Inc. is a baked goods distribution company. Otis Spunkmeyer produces cookies, muffins, frozen cookie doughs, and other pastries.

== History ==
Ken Rawlings, the founder of Otis Spunkmeyer, Inc., opened the first fresh-baked cookie store in Oakland, California in 1977. For the name of the business, Rawlings took the suggestion of his 12-year-old daughter who coined the name. By 1983, with his brother Bill, Rawlings had grown the company to less than two dozen stores. With high overhead costs and weak sales, the company shifted its focus from retail to wholesale, creating a store-baked cookie program for other foodservice operators. The program included pre-portioned frozen cookie dough, a pre-set convection oven, and marketing materials. This program allowed both big and small foodservice operators to sell store-baked cookies in their facilities.

Otis Spunkmeyer hired a pair of DC-3 aircraft painted with the company logo and had them fly over the Golden Gate bridge.

A 2002 management buyout was led by chief executive officer, John Schiavo, in association with the private equity firm of Code Hennessy & Simmons.

In September 2005, Otis Spunkmeyer acquired Merkel-McDonald, Inc., a manufacturer, and distributor of frozen IQF Cookie Dough products for the foodservice market, doing business as Chippery. Chippery is based out of Austin, Texas and has a 97,000-square-foot (9,000 m^{2}) manufacturing facility located there.

In November 2006, the company was sold to Irish Agricultural Wholesale Society ('IAWS') for $561 million. IAWS already owned Cuisine de France and La Brea Bakery, and merged with Hiestand to form Aryzta in 2008.
