= Ben Davis (clothing) =

American workwear brand, founded 1935

- Company type: Private
- Industry: Workwear
- Founded: 1935; 91 years ago in San Francisco, California
- Founders: Ben Davis; Simon Davis
- Headquarters: San Rafael, California, U.S.
- Area served: Worldwide
- Website: www.bendavis.com

Ben Davis is an American workwear brand, founded in 1935, in San Francisco, California with headquarters in San Rafael, California. The company founder, Ben Davis' grandfather, Jacob Davis was the inventor of the original Levi's riveted jeans, and partnered with Levi Strauss in 1871 to mass-produce blue jeans. The brand's signature product is its heavyweight cotton/polyester blended twill fabric, which is used for most of its workwear clothing. Ben Davis also offers a selection of streetwear.

== History ==
Ben Davis was founded in 1935 as Ben F. Davis Manufacturing Co. by Ben Davis and his father, Simon Davis in San Francisco, California. The original store was on Valencia Street in the Mission District. The Davis family has been involved in the US garment industry since the mid 1800s. Ben Davis black jeans were popular with the International Longshore and Warehouse Union for their sturdy, rugged, and high quality denim. The longshoremen wore black Ben Davis jeans and white hats in the annual Labor Day parade from the Ferry Building to City Hall in San Francisco. Its clothing would catch on in Los Angeles and other parts of the U.S. The brand was later worn by Chicano, African-American, and Filipino youth. Initially, tags on Ben Davis clothing read "Union Made Plenty Tough"; this was changed to "USA Made Plenty Tough" after a union dispute in 2004, and then to "Est. 1935 Plenty Tough" after certain products began to be sourced from outside the U.S. Co-founder Ben Davis died on February 19, 2009. The company has been run by his son Frank Davis since 1995, who was interviewed in a Grand Royal magazine article. In 2019, Ben Davis collaborated with Supreme to release a fall/winter collection as a tribute to American workwear.

== In popular culture ==
Ben Davis shirts have been shown in the 1992 "Let Me Ride" video from rapper Dr. Dre, the Beastie Boys have mentioned the brand in their music, and Eazy-E used a Ben Davis shirt in his music video for the song "Real Muthaphuckkin G's". Chicano rapper Lil Rob has mentioned Ben Davis clothing in his songs. Also the Mexican rapper Mr. Yosie Locote made an entire song about the Ben Davis clothing, called "Ben Davis mi marca" ('Ben Davis my brand'). Ice Cube mentions Ben Davis in his song "Ghetto Vet" on his War and Peace Vol. 1 album and also wears a Ben Davis shirt on his "Friday" music video. On Bangin' on Wax, the 1993 album by Bloods & Crips, Crip rapper AWOL refers to Ben Davis clothing on the song "K's Up". Havokk and Prodeje from the legendary South Central Cartel mention wearing Ben Davis in their music. Kid Rock also mentions Ben Davis in his song “American Badass”, rhyming “Devil without a cause And I'm back with the beaver hats and Ben Davis slacks”.

== See also ==
- Levi's
- Carhartt
- Dickies
