= List of companies based in Berkeley, California =

This is a list of companies based in Berkeley, California, current and former businesses either located in Berkeley or with their administrative offices there. Berkeley is the location of a number of nationally prominent businesses, many of which have been pioneers in their areas of operation.

== Current ==
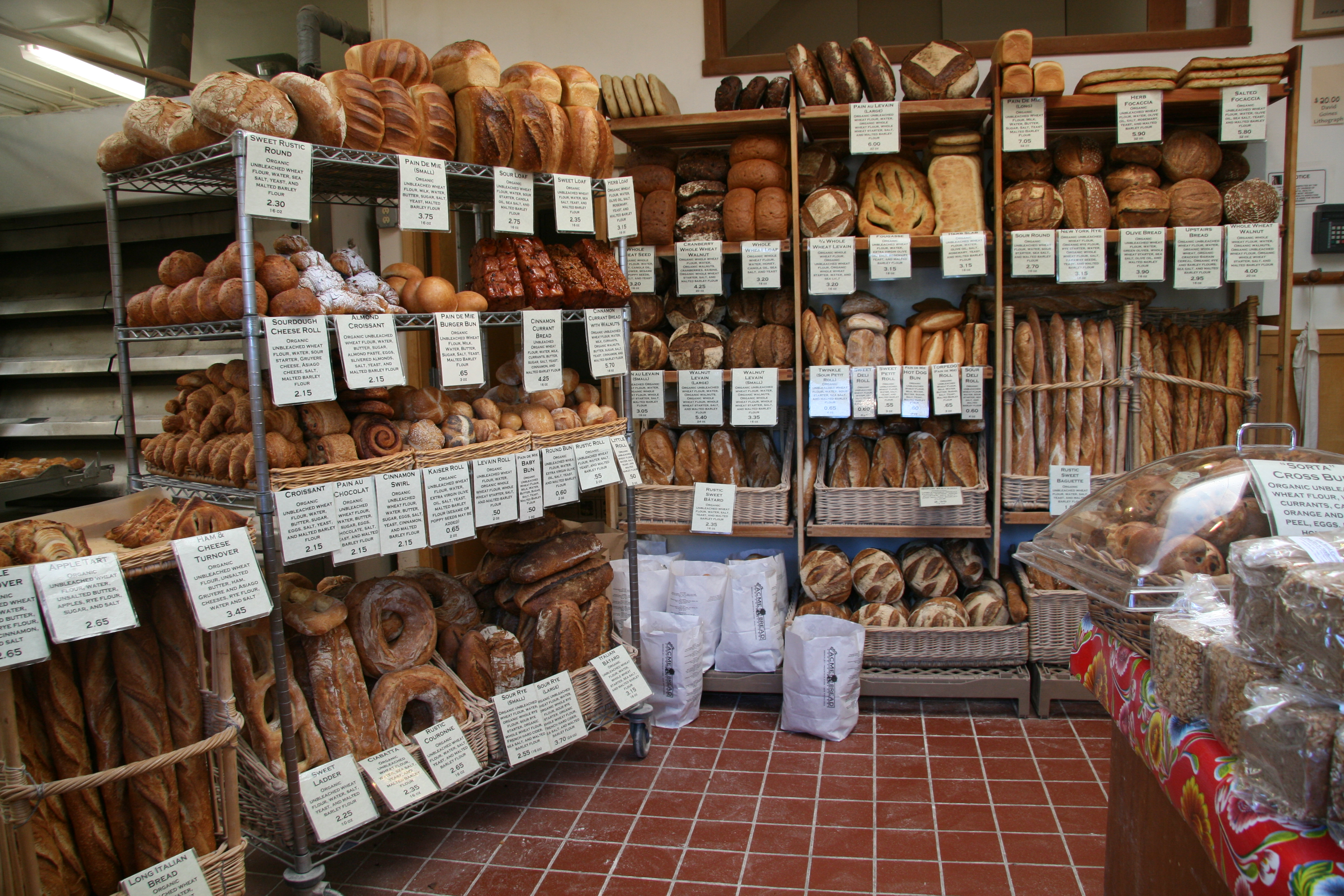
Acme Bread

- 924 Gilman - founded in 1986; an all-ages, non-profit, collectively organized music club where Berkeley natives Operation Ivy, Pansy Division, Green Day, Rancid, Crimpshrine, Tiger Army and AFI started out
- Aaron Marcus and Associates, Inc.
- Acme Bread Company - one of the earliest artisanal bakers in the Bay Area
- AlbertMing
- Amoeba Music
- Annie's Homegrown - natural/organic food manufacturer
- Berkeley Bowl
- Berkeley Electronic Press
- Boner Records
- BookFinder.com
- Caffe Mediterraneum - Allen Ginsberg wrote part of "Howl" at "Caffe Med"
- The Cheese Board - founded in 1967/71, this business comprises two collectively owned and operated businesses
- Chez Panisse - founded in 1971 and the birthplace of California cuisine
- The Claremont Resort - founded in 1906, this historic site was originally the Claremont Hotel. Although the main hotel building lies entirely within the city limits of adjacent Oakland, a portion of the grounds lie within Berkeley, and the resort uses this for its street address.
- Cleis Press - feminist and woman-centered publishing company; moved from Minneapolis to San Francisco and is now located in Berkeley
- Computers and Structures
- Counterpoint - book publisher
- DYMO Corporation
- Earthmine
- East Bay Vivarium
- Fantasy Studios - recording studio founded by Saul Zaentz
- The Freight and Salvage - founded in 1968, this is a nonprofit musical performance venue that primarily hosts folk music and world music acts
- The Good Bean
- GU Energy Labs
- Heyday Books - independent nonprofit publisher with a focus on California history, often partnering with organizations such as the Oakland Museum and Santa Clara University; founded by Berkeleyan Malcolm Margolin
- LeadGenius
- Magnatune
- Master-McNeil
- Meyer Sound Laboratories
- Middle-earth Enterprises
- Monterey Market
- Ninth Street Opus
- Noah's Bagels
- Nolo.com
- North Atlantic Books
- Pacific Steel
- Peachpit
- PowerBar
- Publishers Group West

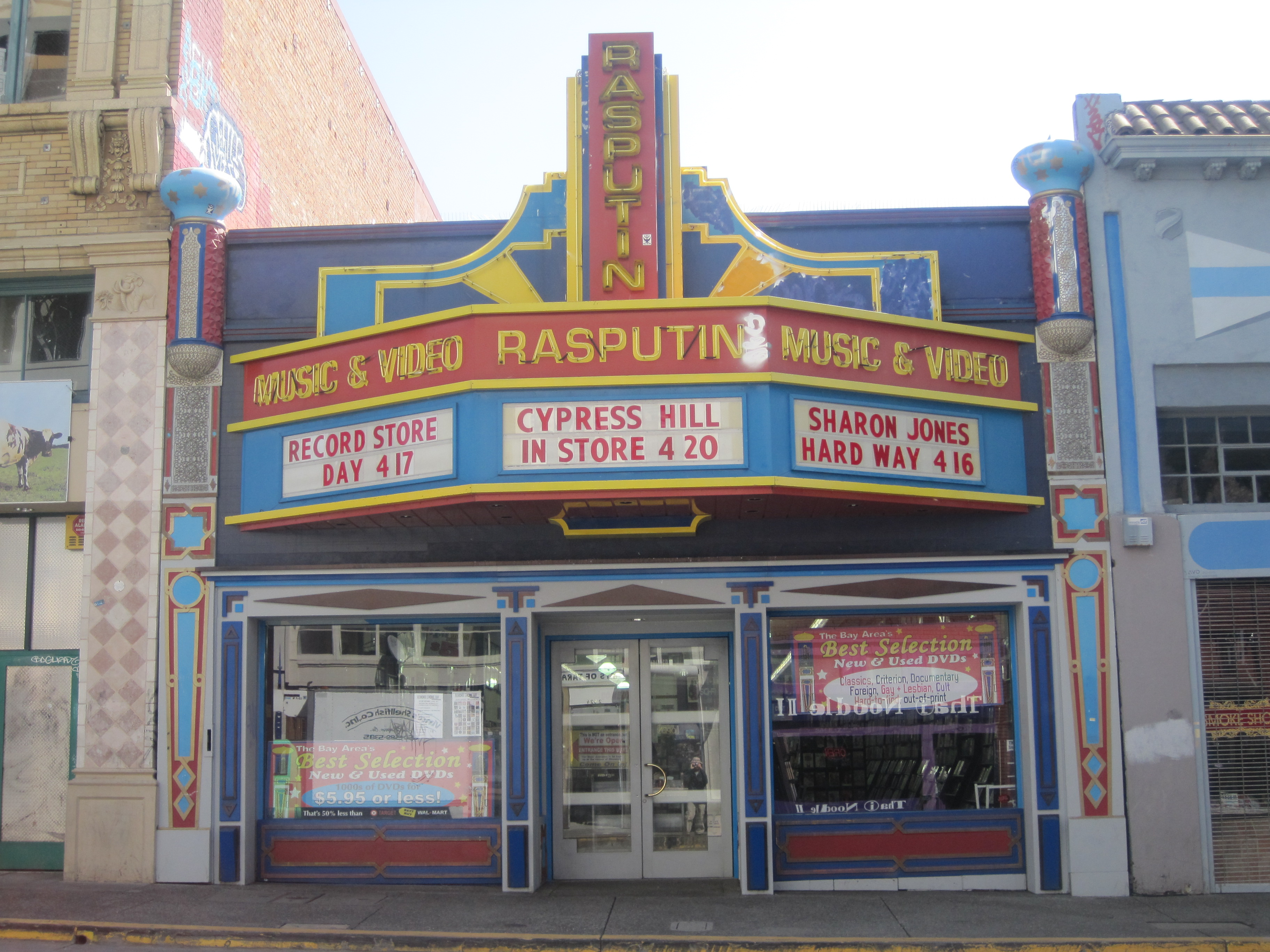
Rasputin Music

- Rasputin Music
- Revival Bar and Kitchen - bar and restaurant focused on food and drinks produced locally and sustainably
- Rigetti Computing
- Ronin Publishing
- Small Press Distribution
- Soft Skull Press
- Stone Bridge Press
- Ten Speed Press
- Triple Rock Brewery and Alehouse
- University of California Press
- Wide Hive Records

== Historic ==
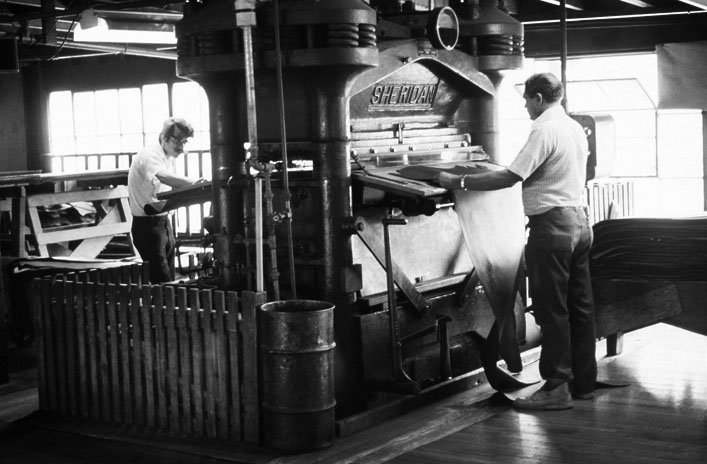
Men working leather at the now defunct Manasse-Block Tannery in Berkeley, California

- Axcom Trading Advisors
- Berkeley Farms
- Berkeley Systems
- Berkeley Softworks
- Berkeley Tribe
- Beserkley Records
- Black Lizard - book publisher
- Bookpeople - an alternative book wholesaler, responsible for much of the growth in alternative/small press book publishing from 1970-1990; moved to Oakland in the 1990s, closed in 2004
- California Faience
- Cetus Corporation
- Clif Bar - headquarters formerly in Berkeley, moved to neighboring Emeryville
- Cody's Books - founded in 1956 and closed in 2008, was "a pioneer in bookselling, bringing the paperback revolution to Berkeley, fighting censorship, and providing a safe harbor from teargas for student activists during the Free Speech Movement and throughout the 1960s and 70s"
- Consumers' Cooperative of Berkeley - the "Berkeley Co-op", a consumers' cooperative that operated from 1939 to 1988; at its height of popularity had over 100,000 members, making it the largest cooperative of its kind in North America

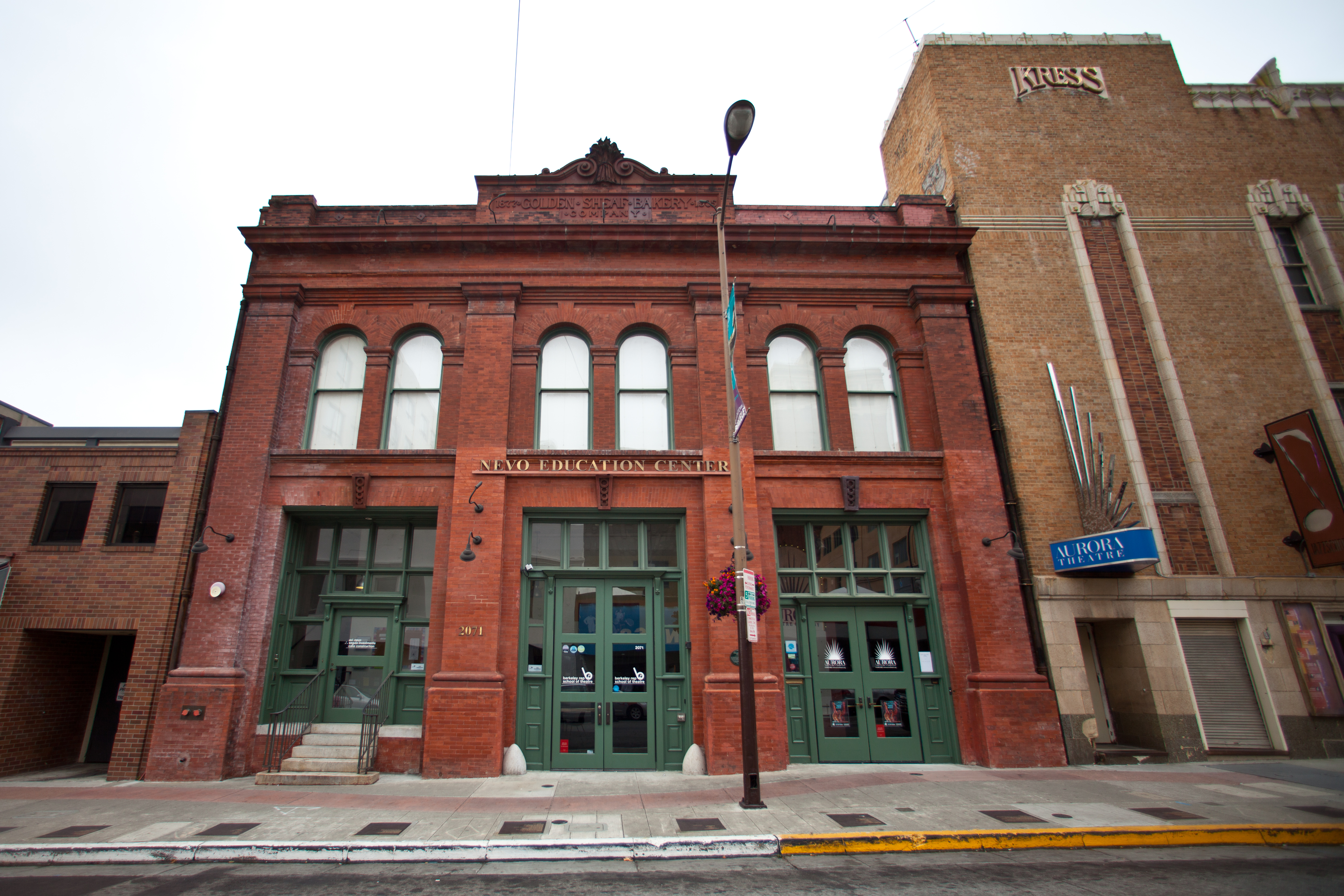
Golden Sheaf Bakery

- Cutter Laboratories - pharmaceutical company bought out by Bayer in the 1970s
- Daliel's Bookstore
- Ekso Bionics - moved to Richmond
- ESS Technology - moved to Fremont
- Fantasy Records - primarily now in Hollywood
- Grey Rabbit - long-distance bus company; out of business in 1983
- Hall-Scott - defunct engine manufacturer
- Howell-North Books - publishers of railroadiana and history books
- Image Comics - independent comic book publisher (moved to Portland, OR)
- Lookout Records
- Metalanguage Records
- The Nature Company - former nationwide natural history and scientific general merchandise retailer
- The Other Change of Hobbit - one of Berkeley's two science fiction and fantasy bookstores; first opened in 1977 (moved to El Cerrito)
- Peet's Coffee & Tea - opened its first store in Berkeley, at Vine and Walnut Street, which is still operating; its corporate headquarters and roasting plant are now located in nearby Alameda
- Rocknroll Blitzkrieg Records

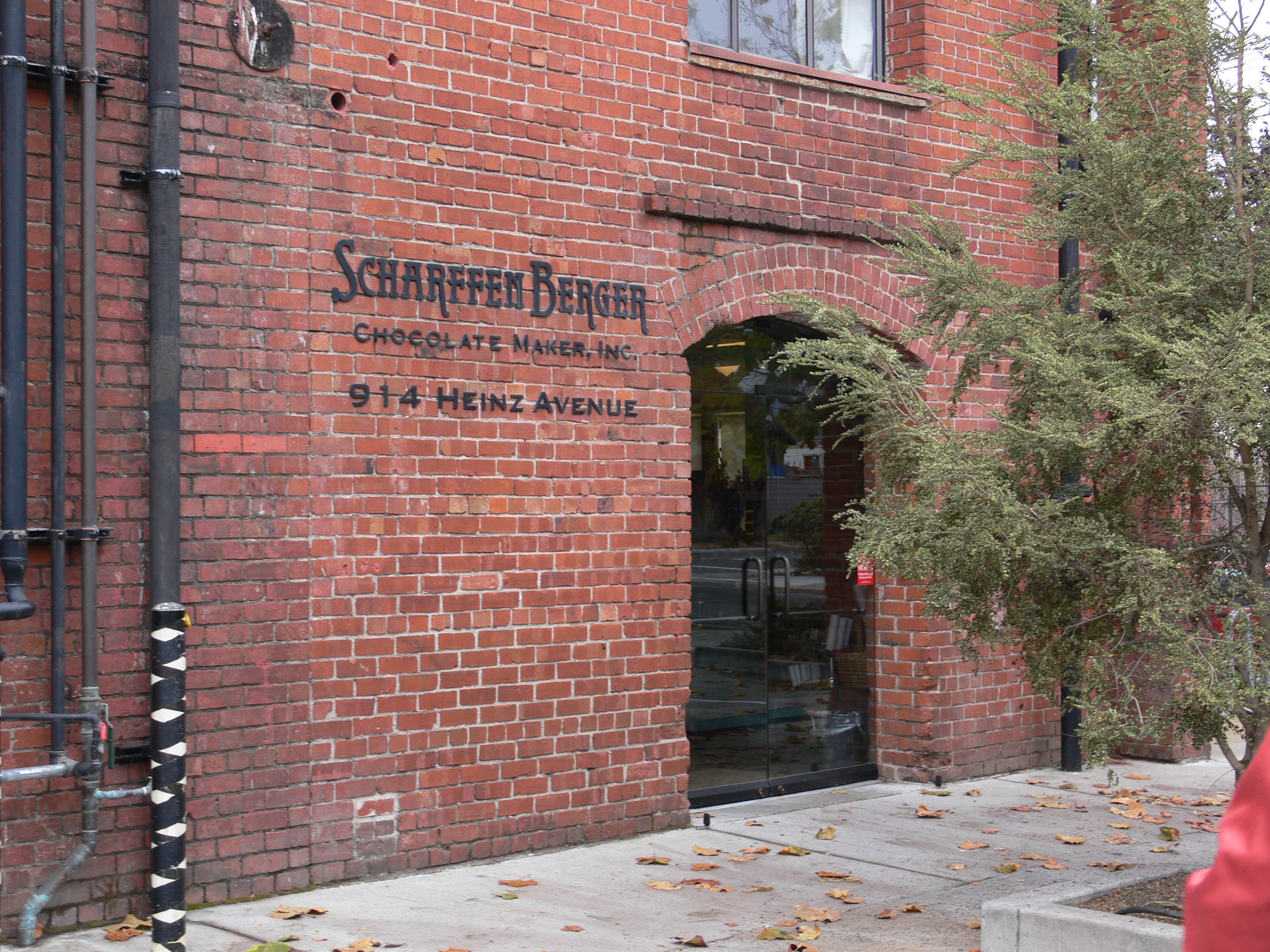
Scharffen Berger

- Scharffen Berger Chocolate Maker - now a subsidiary of The Hershey Company, closing the Berkeley factory in 2009
- Shambhala Publications - now in Massachusetts
- Whole Earth Access - founded in 1969 and closed in 1998; initially a countercultural retail store inspired by Stewart Brand's Whole Earth Catalog
- Wilderness Press - moved to Alabama
- Wind River Systems - moved to Alameda

=== Historic top employers ===
According to the City's 2009 Comprehensive Annual Financial Report, the top employers in the city for that year were:

#	Employer	# of employees
1	University of California, Berkeley	14,444
2	Lawrence Berkeley National Laboratory	3,735
3	Alta Bates Summit Medical Center	3,100
4	City of Berkeley	1,658
5	Bayer	1,500
6	Berkeley Unified School District	1,200
7	Kaiser Permanente	700
8	Pacific Steel	600
9	Andronico's	325
10	Berkeley City College	300

- Former employers of note include the State of California Health Department (900 in 1988, 600 in 2001), now the California Department of Public Health and the California Department of Health Care Services.

== See also ==
- List of companies based in the San Francisco Bay Area
