= San Francisco Baking Institute =

Coordinates: 37.65413°N 122.38657°W

- South San Francisco, California; United States

Information
- Type: Private; unaccredited culinary school
- Established: 1996
- Founder: Michel Suas
- Campus: Urban
- Affiliations: Bread Bakers Guild of America (training partner)
- Website: www.sfbi.com

The San Francisco Baking Institute (SFBI) is a private, unaccredited culinary school in South San Francisco, California founded by Michel Suas and his wife Evelyne Suas in 1996. The school hosts bread and pastry classes for professional and amateur bakers, as well as baking instructors.

== History and founding ==
Suas began baking at age 14 in Brittany, France. At age 21, he became head pastry chef at Barrier, a Michelin Guide three-star restaurant in Tours, France. Several years later, Suas and his wife immigrated to the United States and toured the country in a Volkswagen van, ending up in San Francisco in 1987. Acme Bread was his first client, and La Brea Bakery was his second, followed by many others throughout the United States including Metropolis, Grace Baking, Boudin Bakery, and Thomas Keller's restaurants.

In 1996 Suas opened the Institute in South San Francisco.

== Operations ==
The San Francisco Baking Institute (SFBI) offers short workshops (2-5 day seminars on specific topics) as well as an 18-week full-time and 24-week part-time Bread & Pastry Professional Training Program. Enrollment is typically approximately 30 students at a given time: 16 in bread classes and 12–16 in pastry classes.

Since 2001, the institute has worked with the Bread Project to train low-income students for bakery careers.

In 2005 the institute was the training center for the American team that won the Coupe du Monde de la Boulangerie, a world championship for bakers held every three years at Europain, a bread exhibition in Paris, France.

== Related businesses ==
Soon after opening the institute, Michel Suas also founded an equipment importer, TMB Baking, and a retail bakery, Thorough Bread and Pastry, that sells food made by professional bakers who have graduated from the school's professional training program or internship.

In 2012, Suas partnered with Belinda Leong to open B.Patisserie in San Francisco.

The Institute trained Armando Lacayo, owner of the Arsicault Bakery in San Francisco, which Bon Appétit magazine named America's best new bakery in 2016.

== Awards ==
In 2002, the Bread Bakers Guild of America awarded Suas its Golden Baguette in recognition of his contributions to the artisan baking industry. In 2018, Suas won the James Beard Foundation Award for Outstanding Baker, sharing the honor with his partner at B.Patisserie, Belinda Leong.

== Bibliography ==
- Suas, Michel (April 4, 2008). Advanced Bread and Pastry. Cengage Learning. ISBN 978-1-4180-1169-7.
