= History of bread in California =

The history of California bread as a prominent factor in the field of bread baking dates from the days of the California Gold Rush around 1849, encompassing the development of sourdough bread in San Francisco. It includes the rise of artisan bakeries in the 1980s, which strongly influenced what has been called the "Bread Revolution".

== Bread in San Francisco ==
There have been independent retail bakeries in San Francisco continuously since the California Gold Rush of 1849, and many restaurants make their own bread. However, the wholesale market (which distributes bread to restaurants and grocery stores) was marked by a slow decline from the early heyday, and the subsequent emergence of a new generation of artisan bakers.

=== Gold-rush era ===
Sourdough bread traces its origins to ancient Egypt and is common in parts of Europe. It became a staple in San Francisco during the California Gold Rush of 1849. Gold miners valued it for their camps because of its durability, and the relative ease of obtaining yeast. Although many different kinds of pre-ferment (a dough-like mixture of fermented flour and water containing bacteria and wild yeast) are suitable for making sourdough, specific species of bacteria (Lactobacillus sanfrancisco) and wild yeast (Candida humilis) have been identified as the predominant cultures in local breads. Sourdough starters were carefully kept and maintained by each bakery as a "mother sponge". Using the same starter over time helped bakers continue traditions that had been practiced for generations.

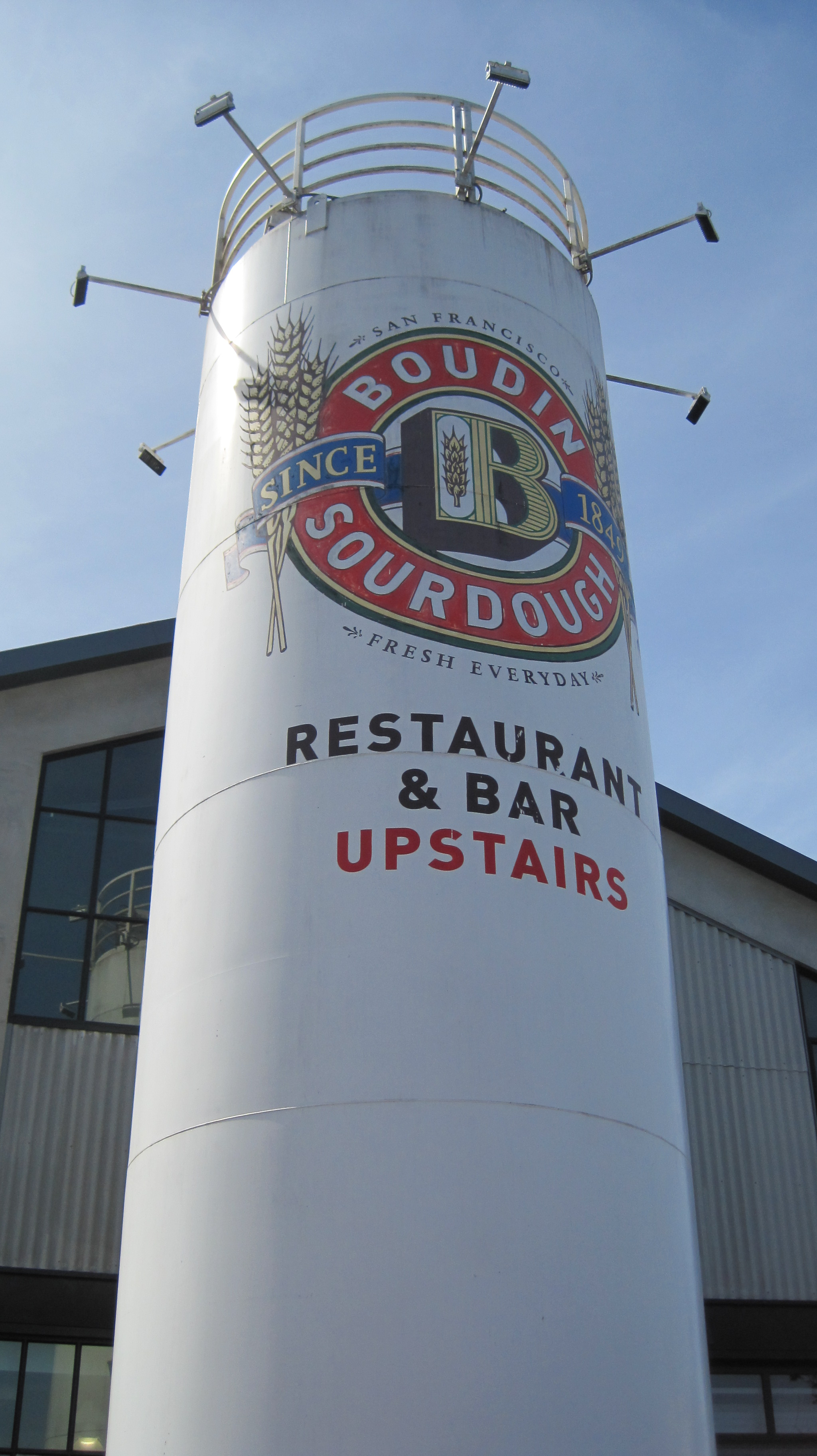
Boudin Bakery, San Francisco

By 1854 there were 63 bakeries in San Francisco. The Boudin Bakery was founded in 1849 by Isidore Boudin, son of a family of master bakers from Burgundy, France. Boudin applied French baking techniques to the fermented-dough bread. The bakery continues to use the starter which originated in the 19th century. Parisian, a popular bread in San Francisco for many years, started in 1856. Parisian supplied San Francisco's oldest restaurant, Tadich Grill, for 141 years until the bakery closed. In Oakland, Toscana started in 1895 and Colombo in 1896. Also in 1896, the Larraburu Brothers bakery, located at 365 3rd Avenue, was started by two Basque brothers who immigrated to the U.S. from France, bringing their starter with them. In 1899, Fritz Schweninger founded the Carmel Bakery, on Ocean Avenue in Carmel-By-The-Sea; it remains the oldest bakery in California still in its original building.

=== Post-war era ===
Starting after World War II, a generation of decline and consolidation saw Americans increasingly eating packaged, sliced loaves. Beginning in the 1950s and continuing through the 1980s, there was less fresh bread available across America, leading writer Henry Miller to complain, "You can travel 50,000 miles in America without once tasting a piece of good bread." Much of the decline paralleled nationwide trends, both for bread and other foods, toward consolidation, lower-priced and frozen ingredients, reduced labor costs and added preservatives for longer shelf life. Mechanization requires drier dough than hand-formed loaves, leading to drier loaves that do not have the same large gas bubbles and chewy consistency of good sourdough. Despite this trend, sourdough remained popular in the bay area.

Bakery	Main location	Est.	Closed	Principals
Boudin	399 10th Ave., San Francisco	1849	Still open	Isidore Boudin; Daniel Giraudo
Parisian*	1995 Evans Ave., San Francisco	1856	August, 2005	
Toscana*	939 3rd St.; 3924 Market, Oakland	1895	?	
Larraburu Bros.*	365 3rd Ave., San Francisco	1896	May, 1976	Larraburu Bros; Harold Paul, Sr. & Jr.
Colombo*	580 Julie Ann Way, Oakland	1896	November, 2012	
Carmel Bakery	Ocean Ave. between Lincoln and Dolores St., Carmel-by-the-Sea	1899	Still Open	Fritz Schweninger
Baroni*	Baroni French Baking Co., 7801 Edgewater Dr., Oakland	Inc. 1968	?	George Valerio
Venetian	2200 Powell St., San Francisco	?	April, 1979	Aldo Bertolina
Pisano	Main & Chestnut; Maple St. & Veterans Blvd., Redwood City	1950	?	
*Studied by USDA in 1969

Colombo also produced sourdough rolls in its bakery at 1329 Fee Drive, Sacramento, which closed in 2003.

In 1969, two researchers at the Western Regional Research Center of the U. S. Department of Agriculture in Albany, Calif., Dr. Leo Kline and Frank Sugihara, began a study of sourdough cultures from five bakeries in the San Francisco area: Parisian, Toscana, Colombo, Baroni and Larraburu. After years of trying to identify the bacteria responsible for the unique flavor of S.F. sourdough, they turned to the Microbiology Department at Oregon State University where a team led by Dr. William Sandine was finally successful in isolating the bacteria from the wild yeast (Candida humilis) and discovered the theretofore-unknown lactobacillus that produces the lactic acid that gives the bread its unique flavor. They named it (Lactobacillus sanfrancisco).

Some bakeries from the gold rush era kept the sourdough tradition alive and continued to produce bread. The Larraburu Brothers bakery produced a popular brand of sourdough but was forced to close in May, 1976 after protracted litigation arising from an accident in which a small child was severely injured by a Larraburu delivery truck. The owners had also taken on a great deal of debt which contributed to the bakery's financial woes. In 1971, Toscana merged with Colombo Baking Co, both of which were located in Oakland. The Parisian Bakery was purchased in 1982.

Steven Giraudo, a baker who immigrated from Italy in 1935, took his first job in America at Boudin, then bought the bakery out of near bankruptcy in 1941. He later sold it to a larger company, but after a series of ownership changes the bakery was bought back by two of Giraudo's sons through their investment bank. The Giraudo family bought Parisian in 1982, transferring it in 1984 to the San Francisco French Bread Company of Oakland, which in turn acquired Colombo and Toscana, replacing the hearth ovens with high-capacity ovens. In 1993 the San Francisco French Bread Company was sold to Illinois-based Specialty Foods Corp. The sale marked the end of local ownership for three sourdough bakeries which had been in operation since the 1800s.

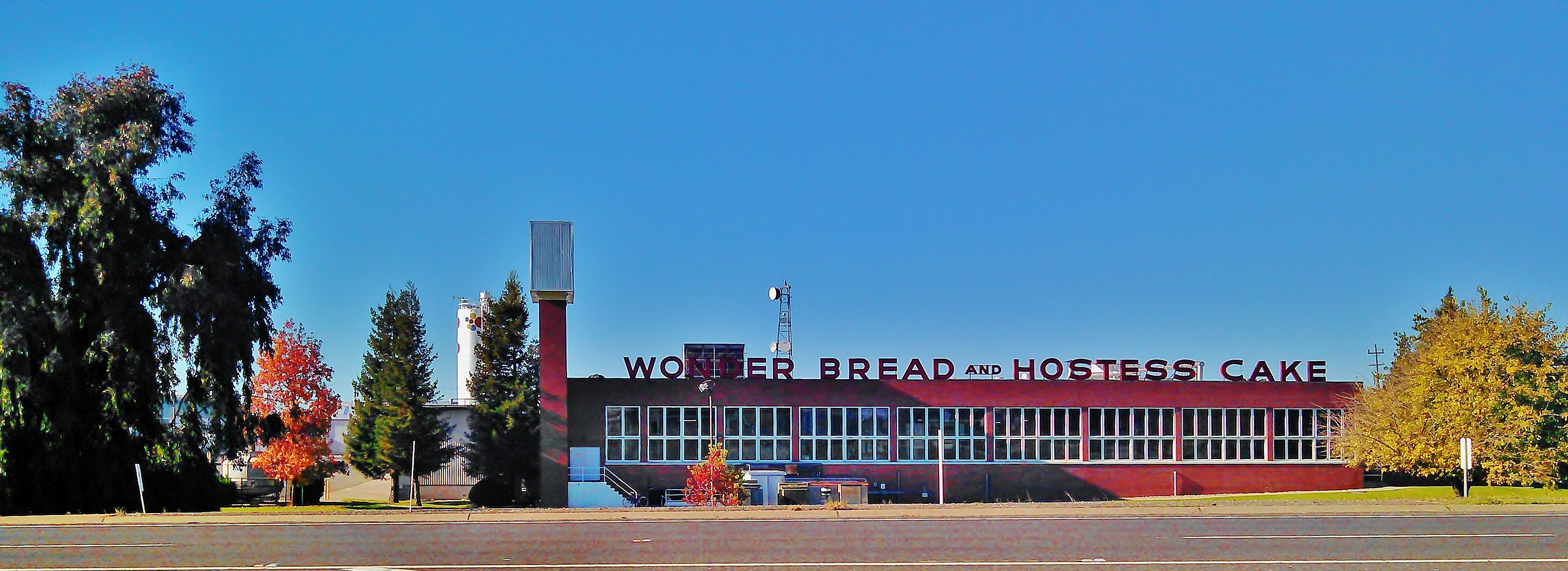
Wonder Bread and Hostess bakery in Sacramento, California

In March, 1997, San Francisco French Bread Company was purchased from Specialty Foods Corp. by Interstate Bakeries Corporation of Kansas City, Missouri which went bankrupt and shut down the Parisian bakery in 2005, saying the bakery was no longer profitable. At the Colombo bakery in Oakland, recipes, ingredients and fermentation times were changed, impacting the quality of the bread. Before its demise on November 21, 2012, Interstate was making 217,460 loaves of Colombo sourdough per week at its Oakland factory, and 71,540 rolls per week at its bakery in Sacramento, as well as Wonder Bread, Twinkies, and Ho Hos snacks from a sister factory at 1525 Bryant street.

The old bakeries that survived were large, mechanized operations. They were not small "artisan" bakeries in the modern sense. The top three bakeries employed 1,000 people and made sixty million units of bread per year (mostly loaves) that they sold in more than 4,000 Northern California outlets, as well as airports and supermarkets throughout the United States. Boudin operates 32 retail outlets, mostly as coffee shops, including outlets at Disneyland and Fisherman's Wharf.

== Bread in Southern California ==
Louis Mesmer's first business in 1820s Los Angeles was a bakery; he was also apparently the only local producer of matzah, “which he sold to nearly all the Jewish families of Southern California.”

Bread bakeries in Los Angeles include La Brea Bakery. A popular sour dough bread was widely available from Pioneer Baking in the Los Angeles area, but it disappeared from shelves around the year 2000.

== Artisan bread movement ==
The artisan bread movement represents a return to low-volume production of handmade loaves. It is in some ways a return to older techniques, but in other ways it is a shift. Unlike the Gold Rush bakers, they were based on French and Italian techniques and very crusty. Among the hallmarks of the new artisan breads, loaves are exposed to steam while baking (a technique developed in Vienna, Austria), creating a shiny surface that may be crusty or chewy, while keeping the interior moist. "Rustic" breads use whole grain flours, including rye flour and whole wheat. Breads are scored with decorative cross-cuts, along which the bread cracks while rising and baking to allow the crust to expand. Scores are made in distinctive styles that identify each bakery.

=== Early proponents ===
The first of the many new companies arose out of the Tassajara Zen Mountain Center near Carmel Valley, California, a group of monks derived from the San Francisco Zen Center (which owns Greens Restaurant) that began baking bread in 1963 and operated a bakery in San Francisco's Cole Valley from 1976 to 1992. A pastry shop, Just Desserts, operated the bakery from then until 1999.

The Cheese Board Collective opened in 1967 in what would later be known as Berkeley's "Gourmet Ghetto", and became a worker-owned cooperative in 1971.

In 1970 Narsai David, food and wine editor of KCBS and a nationally syndicated food writer, opened a highly successful catering business and restaurant, Narsai's, in Kensington, California. Narsai's became renowned for its bread making. David explained his philosophy: "Using nothing more than flour, water, salt and yeast, you could bake a loaf of bread in as little as three hours, or you could take 24 hours. The one that takes 24 hours has developed a much more sophisticated flavor. Take two to three hours and the bread tastes like flour and water."

=== Modern-era companies ===
==== San Francisco Bay Area ====
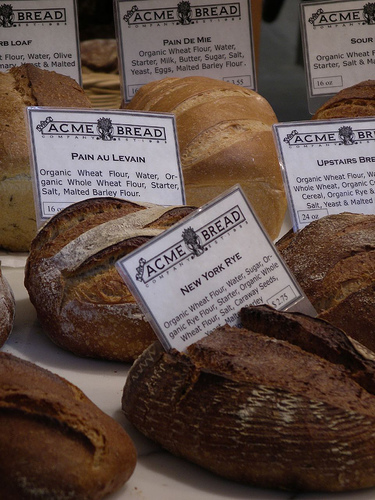
Acme bread loaves on display at Ferry Building retail shop in San Francisco

Acme Bread Company is an early, influential modern artisan bread maker, reported to have "launched an artisanal bread-making revolution in the 1980s" with their sourdough bread. In 1977 founder Steve Sullivan, a student at University of California, Berkeley who was earning money as a busboy at Chez Panisse, bought Elizabeth David's 1977 book on bread during a trip to Europe, and began trying to recreate the bread he had tried in Paris on his return. In 1979 he became in-house bread maker at Chez Panisse, when the Cheese Board Collective could not keep up with demand. Jeremiah Tower, then head chef, encouraged Sullivan to study breadmaking at Narsai David's bakery. He later left to launch Acme with his wife Susan, half funded by Doobie Brothers guitarist Patrick Simmons. Encouraged by advice from a winery in Bandol, they obtained Acme's starter culture from yeast of wine grapes they found at Sullivan's father's vineyard in Napa.

Semifreddi's Bakery is an Alameda-based artisan bakery that serves the entire San Francisco Bay Area. In 1984, Eric and Carol Sartenaer, ex-Cheese Board Collective members, opened shop in a 450-square-foot “hole in the wall” bakery in Kensington, California. In January 1987, Barbara Frainier (one of their first employees) took over the business with her husband Michael Rose. In 1988, Tom Frainier (Barbara's brother) joined the Semifreddi's team. Tom, who holds an MBA from Berkeley's Haas School of Business, left an upper management position at Clorox to join his sister and brother-in-law, both UC Berkeley alumni, in the bread and pastry-making business. When asked about his exit strategy, Frainier replies, “death.” After Frainier took the helm as President, CEO, and self-proclaimed, “Chief Boot Licker,” Semifreddi's rapidly expanded throughout the San Francisco Bay, while maintaining its emphasis on baking high-quality, European-style artisan bread and pastries.

Many other artisan bakers have followed in the steps of Tassajara, Cheese Board, Narsai's, Acme, and Semifreddi's, often started by veterans of other local bakeries and of Chez Panisse. In 1989 former Chez Panisse pastry chef Diane Dexter and her husband David started Metropolis Baking Company, hiring a head baker who had worked at both Acme and Semifreddi's. La Farine Bakery was bought by Jeff Dodge, who had worked with Acme for six years. Glenn Mitchell, who had baked with Simmons at Chez Panisse, started Grace Baking Co. at the "Market Hall" food emporium in Oakland, California in 1987. Craig Ponsford founded Artisan Breads in Sonoma, California in 1992. The Cheese Board helped set up a sister cooperative, Arizmendi Bakery, in 1997 in Oakland, and another in San Francisco's Inner Sunset in 2000. Other notable brands with wide local distribution include the French-Italian Bakery in San Francisco's North Beach (which distributes primarily to restaurants), The Bread Workshop, and Noe Valley Bakery. In 2013, the BBC described Mission-based bakery Tartine as making "some of the city’s best sourdough".

All told, in the early 2000s there were at least 65 "microbakeries" in the Bay Area, including the original bakers (Boudin, Colombo, and Toscana), collectively making approximately 2.4 million loaves of bread per week. All are small locally owned operations that distribute locally, except for the "big three" and Grace Baking, which was purchased in 2002 by Maple Leaf Foods, a Canadian firm, and distributes nationally to Safeway and Costco. Grace maintains quality standards by baking the bread only partly, with final baking at the point of sale. Recently, Artisan and Boudin have entered into a distribution arrangement.

Although they represent a return to older ideals of craftsmanship, modern San Francisco breadmakers do not generally try to recreate old-style bread. Instead, the bakeries compete to develop signature loaves and to develop unique shapes, flavors, and styles. Oven technology is greatly improved. Because sourdough is even more sensitive to ambient weather than other bread, bakeries are heavily dependent on climate control, refrigeration, and meteorological measurements and predictions to maintain ideal temperature and humidity conditions, giving them a consistency that would have been impossible during the Gold Rush.

Technically competitors, the various commercial bakeries keep cordial relations and openly share information, mirroring an international culture of collegiality among small bakers. When Ponsford opened Artisan in 1992, Grace, Acme, Semifreddi's, and Metropolis, all shared advice and information. Ponsford went on to lead the industry association, the Bread Bakers Guild of America.

Specialty bakers are not the only source of artisan bread in the Bay Area. Large grocers such as Safeway, Whole Foods, and Andronicos have in-store bakeries that produce sourdough, baguettes, and rustic breads in their Bay Area locations. A number of local restaurants make bread for their own use and also retail sale. Among these is a San-Francisco based chain, Il Fornaio, that licensed a breadmaking concept from Milan, Italy, and has spread internationally and distributes to supermarkets. Restaurateur Pascal Rigo has opened a string of restaurants and patisseries under the umbrella "Bay Bread", which was purchased by Starbucks coffee to provide baked goods for its outlets. Starbucks plans to expand the chain nationally.

One trend is the resurgence and expansion of good sourdough bread companies that follow the model of the pre-Interstate Brands Parisian, Colombo, and Toscana. They are of medium size, deliver to both artisan markets and large chains like Safeway or Nob Hill, and seek reasonable expansion. An example is Sumano's Bakery in Watsonville, California, near Monterey. They produce a classic sourdough loaf with wheat flour, water, starter, and sea salt. Another, which is smaller and delivers only to small artisan markets but which will ship, is the 80-year-old Arcangeli Grocery Company / Norm's Market in historic Pescadero, California, famous for their Artichoke Garlic Bread among 40 other unique artisan breads, San Luis Sourdough in San Luis Obispo was founded in 1983, and makes sourdough bread with only the basic ingredients. In 1987, it was named California's Small Business of the Year by the Small Business Administration. They were acquired by Sara Lee in 2001.

== See also ==
- Food history
- List of American breads
