= Belinda Leong =

American pastry chef

- Born: California
- Education: San Francisco City College
- Culinary career
- Cooking style: Pastry chef
- Current restaurant: b. Patisserie
- Previous restaurants: Aqua Restaurant; Gary Danko; Manresa (restaurant)
- Award won: 2018 James Beard Foundation Award Outstanding Baker
- Website: bpatisserie.com

Belinda Leong is an American pastry chef who is the co-founder and owner of b. Patisserie in San Francisco.

Leong began her culinary career with an internship at Michael Mina's Aqua Restaurant and enrolled in the Hospitality and Restaurant Program at San Francisco City College. After graduating in 1999, she joined Gary Danko, becoming the pastry chef there in 2001.

After eight years at Gary Danko, Leong sought more experience in Europe, staging with Pierre Hermé in Paris, with Carles Mampel at Bubó, Martín Berasategui at Lasarte, René Redzepi at Noma, and at In De Wulf in Belgium. After two years in Europe, she returned to the Bay Area to become the pastry chef at Manresa.

In 2013, Leong partnered with Michel Suas of the San Francisco Baking Institute to open b. Patisserie in San Francisco. Her Kouign-amann became a favorite among customers and received praise from national publications.

In 2015, Leong and Suas opened b. on the Go, a sandwich and lunch spots a few doors down from b. Patisserie.

In 2016, Kona Coffee Purveyors + b. Patisserie opened in Honolulu, O'ahu, where b. Patisserie's goods are served.

Leong was nominated for James Beard Foundation Awards for Outstanding Pastry Chef in 2014, and Outstanding Baker in 2015, 2016, and 2017. In 2018, she won the James Beard Award for Outstanding Baker along with Suas.

In 2018, Leong and Suas opened their first b. Patisserie location in Seoul, South Korea in Gangnam. By 2020, they opened two more Seoul bakeries, in Mapo and Seocho. As of January 2026, the Gangnam location is no longer listed on their website.

In 2018, Leong started doing mochi, though by 2021, that business appeared stalled.

In 2021, Leong and Suas partnered with Chef John Paul Carmona to open Routier Restaurant, serving French food.

In March 2025, they took over a kiosk in Union Square that had previously been occupied by a cafe owned by Tyler Florence. b. Patisserie's presence is limited to a one year lease, and the city will be adding a permanent tenant afterwards.
