= Bread Project =

Organization in Berkeley, California, US

The Bread Project
- Formation: 2001
- Founders: Lucie Buchbinder; Susan L. Phillips
- Type: 501(c)(3) public benefit corporation
- Purpose: Workforce development and job training in baking and food service
- Headquarters: Berkeley, California, U.S.
- Key people: Alicia Polak (executive director); Dale Ray (director of training and development); Mark Chacon (director of bakery operations); John Lee (director of programs and advancement)
- Website: www.breadproject.org

The Bread Project is a 501(c)(3) public benefit corporation with facilities in Berkeley, California. The Bread Project's mission is to empower individuals who have limited resources to progress on their paths to self-sufficiency through skills instruction, on-the-job training project social enterprises, and assistance in gaining a food industry career. Its program consists of a rigorous culinary/bakery training, extensive workplace readiness coaching, on-the-job experience, employer outreach for job placement, and long-term follow-up support.

== History ==
The Bread Project was co-founded in 2001 by the late homelessness prevention advocate Lucie Buchbinder, a Holocaust survivor originally from Vienna, Austria who immigrated to the US in 1938, and Susan L. Phillips, a social worker with a degree and background in sociological research originally from San Rafael, California. They received initial support from the San Francisco Baking Institute, which agreed to provide training and equipment at cost. Both women were working with residents of low-income housing projects in the inner-city Tenderloin neighborhood of San Francisco when they started the Bread Project. There they saw a great need for training residents in marketable skills, resume writing, and how to secure jobs. In order to determine the best type of training program for the residents of the Tenderloin, many of whom were immigrants, Phillips did research on jobs that paid above the minimum wage, required only short training periods, and that required neither high school diplomas nor fluency in English. Positions in the San Francisco Bay Area's growing bakery industry fit those criteria. Buchbinder and Phillips turned active management of the program over to others in 2005. Buchbinder died in 2007 in a train accident at Jack London Square in Oakland, and Phillips is now retired and living in Marin County.

== Notable Staff ==
- Alicia Polak, Executive Director
- Dale Ray, Director of Training and Development,
- Mark Chacon, Director of Bakery Operations,
- John Lee, Director of Programs and Advancement
  - Former Senior Policy Analyst with Ontario Disability Support Program.

== Training Programs ==
=== Curriculum ===
The Bread Project's training program has two main strands: a 12-week Bakery Production course, which prepares trainees for large-scale baked goods production, and a 9-week Food Service program, which prepares trainees for culinary and customer service jobs in cafes, caterers, and restaurants. Both consist of 315 hours of technical training provided by experienced chefs in real industrial kitchens. Trainees also receive 45 hours of job readiness training, addressing positive workplace skills such as professionalism, motivation, presentation, and attitude. We explain, practice, and observe these skills in action to ensure that graduates are able to successfully get and retain jobs. Food Service classes take place at the Berkeley Unified School District's Berkeley Adult School, and Bakery Production classes happen at the former Semifreddi's Bakery location in Emeryville, California.

=== Partnerships and Placement Support ===
The Bread Project works closely with local food employers to identify the skills they expect, and adjusts curricula accordingly. These relationships are also used to find opportunities for graduates and directly place them into jobs whenever possible. A 3-month intensive job development period is activated upon program graduation, where graduates are engaged via an incentive reporting and mentorship program to provide ongoing support and coaching. This also enables the acquisition of outcome data to evaluate and improve our performance.

== Social Enterprises ==
The Bread Project operates multiple social enterprises to ensure financial sustainability, create jobs, and provide on-the-job experience for trainees. All social enterprises are staffed and partially managed by former trainees.

=== Copacking ===
The Bread Project operates a copacking business, where it manufactures and packages food products for partners.

=== Consulting ===
Experts in food science, packaging, and food costing are available to assist food entrepreneurs in refining their products.

=== Catering ===
Breads, pastries, sandwiches, appetizers, and salads are all available for catering.

=== Wholesale Production ===
The Bread Project maintains standing contracts with local school districts to provide muffins and breads to local students.

=== Packaged Goods ===
In 2012, a line of packaged luxury food items was developed that will be sold through national retailers, beginning in February 2013.

=== Cafe ===
In the Berkeley Adult School, part of the Berkeley Unified School District, the Bread Project operates a small cafe.

== Population Served ==
The Bread Project is designed to help low-income individuals struggling with long-term unemployment due to incarceration, addiction, homelessness, and other barriers to work. In 2011–2012, 74% of trainees relied on public benefits or had no income, and 87% were at the poverty income level. The average length of unemployment was 20.4 months. Many struggled with substance abuse (12%), and nearly half had some type of physical or mental disability. At least 30% of trainees have had contact with the criminal justice system. Women account for more than half of trainees, and over 18% were female heads of household. More than 86% identified with minority racial/ethnic groups. The majority of trainees come from Oakland, Berkeley, and Richmond. About 65% lack independent housing, being dependent on public housing, friends, family, shelters, or transitional lodging.

== Program Performance ==
- By December 2012, the Bread Project has produced over 950 graduates.
- Since the 2008 Great Recession, about 70% of graduates got jobs after graduation.
- 76% of those working graduates kept their jobs for at least 3 months.
- The average wage of the 2011-2012 cohort of bakery graduates was $12.50 per hour - 156% of the California minimum wage.
- Since 2008, Bread Project graduates have earned an estimated $6.6M.

== Key Supporters ==
- Chevron Social Investment
- Semifreddi's Bakery
