= East Bay Vivarium =

Coordinates: 37°52′10.4″N 122°17′57.5″W

The East Bay Vivarium is a shop located in Berkeley, California, in the United States. The store is more than fifty years old, and is the oldest and largest store of its kind in the United States. It sells snakes, lizards, various other reptiles and amphibians, as well as the supplies to maintain and care for them. The store is open to reptile enthusiasts, hobbyists, and the general public. The store has been deemed a "must-see" by Disney family and the "strangest attraction" in Berkeley by The New York Times.

== History ==
The vivarium was owned by Ron Cauble. He opened the business in his basement in Oakland, California in 1970. The first storefront was located on Mac Arthur Blvd. in Oakland, then in 1979 he moved the store to an 8,000-square-foot (740 m^{2}) storefront in the Emeryville Market in Emeryville. In 1988, he sold the store and opened The Bone Room in Albany. In 1989, the building was damaged during the Loma Prieta earthquake. The damage was so bad that the store had to move. The insurance company denied the damage claim allowing the store to move. The owners had to pay $10,000 to break out of their lease. Upon moving to their current location on Fifth Street in Berkeley, they made efforts to stabilize the store to avoid future earthquake damage by having shatterproof plastic cages and attaching the shelves, via straps, to the walls. The Fifth Street location is 6,000 square feet (560 m^{2}). The front is the store and the back, which is closed to the public, is the breeding center. As of 2001, Cliff Moser and Owen Maercks co-owned the vivarium. Johnathan Emberton has worked here since 1992 and purchased Cliff's share of the vivarium in 1995. In 2025, Alex Blanchard bought Owen's share.

In 2008, parking concerns threatened to close the vivarium. Owen Maercks spoke at a zoning board meeting, protesting the building of a 22-unit, three-story building, which would be next to the vivarium and cause a loss of parking. The vivarium only offers approximately five parking spaces to visitors. That same year, The New York Times called the vivarium and Moe's Books the only two "must-see" sites in Berkeley.

== Animals and breeding ==
The store carries between 5,000 and 8,000 pets for sale during any given time. They sell animals such as spiders, fish, snakes, lizards, chameleons, frogs, crawfish, and turtles. Specific breeds include rattlesnakes, iguanas, reticulated pythons, tarantulas, Burmese pythons and box turtles. They breed the majority of their stock in a back room. Prices range from $3.50 for a tree frog and $25 to $50 for a snake, to a Chinese crocodile lizard that costs $1,000. They sell snakes that are venomous to small amphibians, not necessarily people; snakes venomous to people are illegal to sell in California. The vivarium breeds crickets, rats and mice for food in a specific private space on the premises. They also sell rabbits, hamsters, guinea pigs, and chickens for food. Customers can also pay a small fee to pet animals in the store.

== Outreach ==
The vivarium has an outreach program that goes to Northern California clubs, schools and museums. Animals such as giant boa constrictors and a monitor lizard may appear at an event. They also offer free materials on how to care for the animals they sell.
