= S.B. Master =

American brand naming executive

- Education: University of California, Santa Cruz; Harvard Business School
- Occupations: Branding executive Entrepreneur
- Board member of: San Francisco Center for the Book; UC Santa Cruz (trustee)
- Website: www.naming.com

S.B. Master is an American branding executive and entrepreneur. She is the founder of the San Francisco-based naming firms Master-McNeil and Naming Matters.

== Career ==
=== Landor Associates, Wordmark ===
In 1980, after earning a BA from UC Santa Cruz and an MBA from the Harvard Business School, Master began her career at Landor Associates, an identity consulting firm. She worked closely with the agency's founder, Walter Landor.

In 1985 Master launched the Landor verbal branding division, Wordmark. As Wordmark's president, she named Walt Disney's new production company Touchstone Pictures, created Westin Hotels for Western International Hotels, and renamed Pacific Telephone and Telegraph Pacific Telesis. Described by the Washington Post as the "enfant terrible" of the naming business, she viewed the practice of using "some weird name that no one can say" to name companies as "littering the American landscape with garbage words."

=== Master-McNeil, Naming Matters ===
In 1989, Master founded Master-McNeil, one of the first companies to focus exclusively on naming and naming architecture. She added the fictitious "McNeil" to the firm's name because it led potential clients to assume that the company was "big and important." In the first five years of its existence, Master-McNeil named several hundred products and companies, including PayPal and more than 50 Apple products.

In 2017, Master founded Naming Matters, a self-service platform that applies natural language processing, machine learning, big data, and data visualization algorithms to suggest and compare brand names based on characteristics including phonetic similarity, similarity of goods, and status of existing trademark applications and registrations.
