= The Bakery Tour =

Tour showing how sourdough bread is made at Disney California Adventure

Boudin Bakery Tour
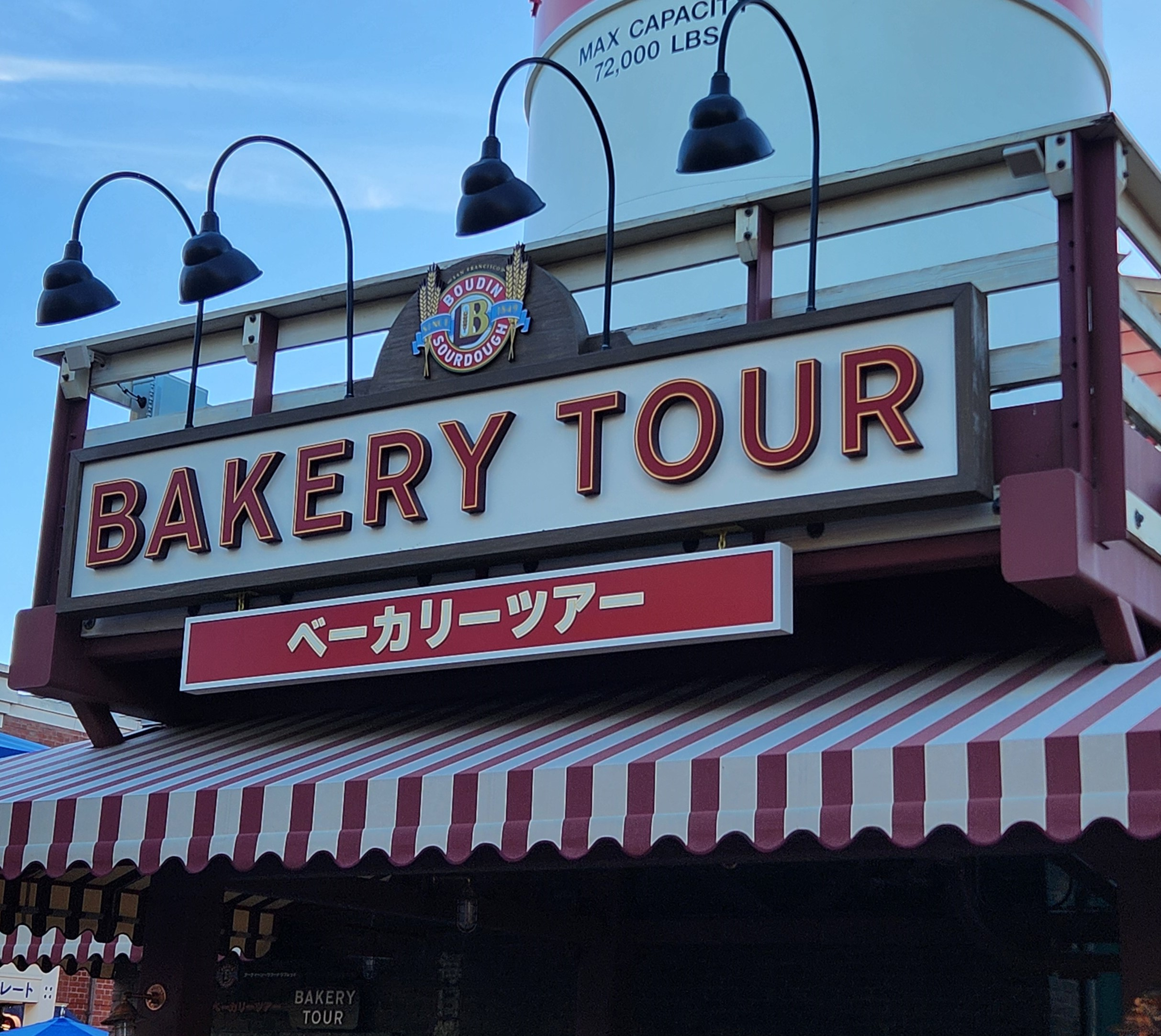

Disney California Adventure
- Area: Pacific Wharf (2001–2023); San Fransokyo Square (2023–present)
- Status: Operating
- Opening date: February 8, 2001

Ride statistics
- Attraction type: self-guided sourdough bread factory tour
- Theme: California wharf
- Music: Dan Follart
- Duration: 13 minutes
- Hosted by: Boudin Bakery, Rosie O'Donnell and Colin Mochrie
- Sponsor: Boudin Bakery
- Closed captioning available

The Boudin Bakery Tour, which opened with Disney California Adventure on February 8, 2001, is a tour that shows how sourdough bread is made, hosted by Boudin Bakery.

In January 2015, the Boudin Bakery Tour was given an update. The tour video screens were removed and the attraction is now self-guided and free-flowing. However, the introduction video about the history of sourdough bread remains. In addition, the attraction now includes a touchscreen trivia game.

== Summary ==
After entering the building, a Disney cast member hands out two pieces of sourdough bread per person. The attraction includes a room with a video screen in front, in which Rosie O'Donnell and Colin Mochrie talk about the history of the bread. After this, guests are able to walk through hallways where they can look through glass windows at a real bakery facility and see sourdough bread being made.
