= AlbertMing =

- Industry: Clothing
- Founded: 2010; 16 years ago
- Founder: Ming Chang, Albert Shyy
- Key people: Ming Chang (CEO); Albert Shyy (CEO)

AlbertMing is a clothing company based in Berkeley, California.

== History ==
AlbertMing was founded by Albert Shyy and Ming Chang in 2010. They were close friends growing up in Florida and attended the same high school. Both of them are UC Berkeley graduates. Shyy studied business and was a managerial consultant before 2010. Chang studied computer science and had worked as an Apple engineer.

== Product ==
Naked Suits by AlbertMing or simply Naked Suits are the company's first line of product. They are water-resistant and could be ordered either off-the rack or made-to-measure. The product name is intended to convey the expectation that the suits are so comfortable, the wearer would not even realize that they are wearing a suit. Shyy and Chang wanted to "reclaim" men's suit by making it more durable and "less miserable" using modern technology.

== Promotion ==
Naked Suits was promoted by numerous artists including Chuck D and Tim Urban.
