= Revival Bar and Kitchen =

Revival Bar & Kitchen

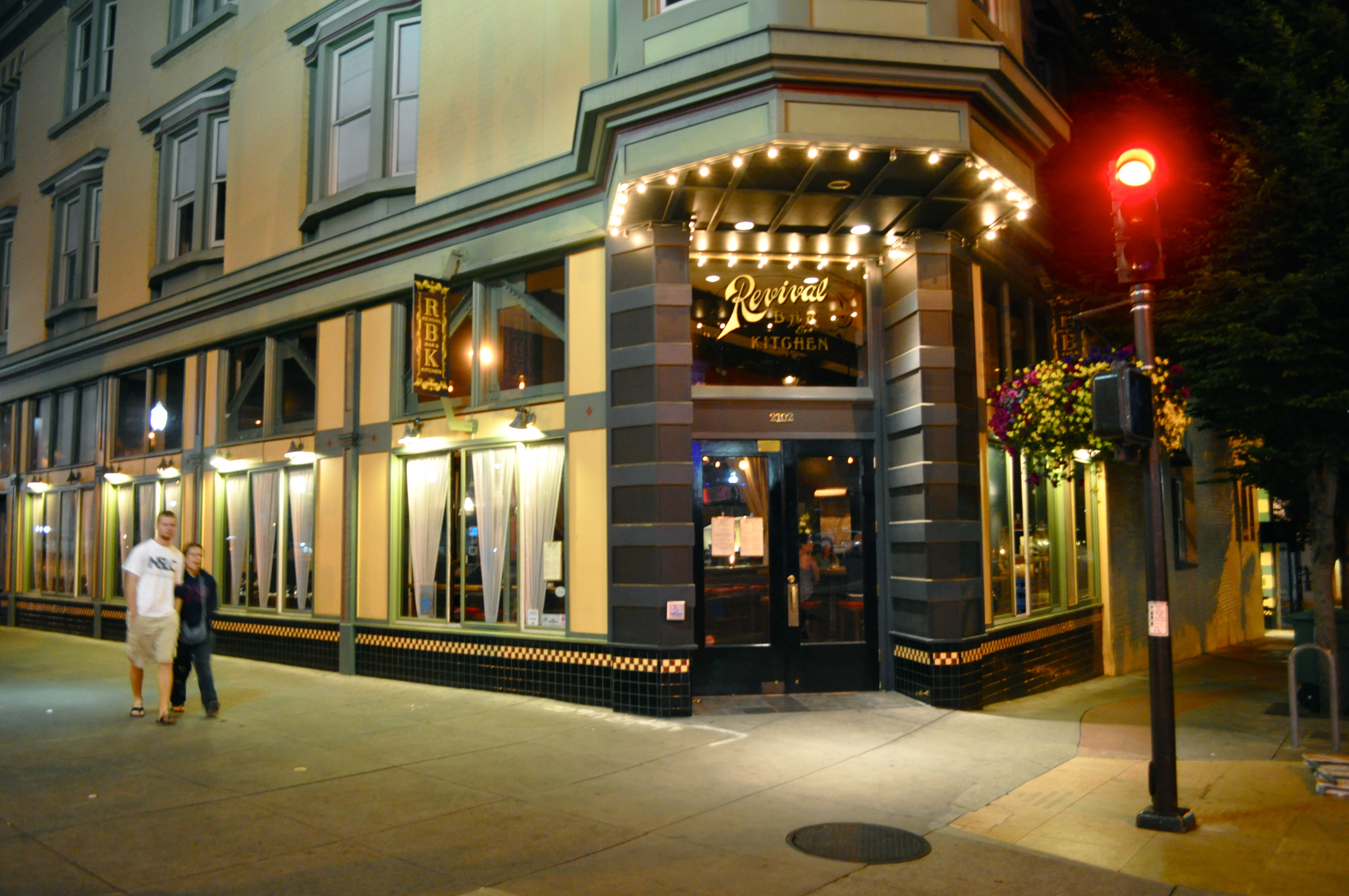
- Interactive map of Revival Bar & Kitchen

Restaurant information
- Established: May 2010
- Head chef: Amy Murray (executive chef)
- Chef: Nat Harry (head mixologist), Patrick Cress (sommelier)
- Location: 2102 Shattuck Avenue, Berkeley, Alameda, California, 94704, United States
- Coordinates: 37°52′15.6″N 122°16′6.5″W
- Reservations: Yes

Revival Bar and Kitchen is a farm-to-table eatery in Berkeley, California that specializes in local, sustainable, ethical food. It first opened its doors in May 2010 with Amy Murray as owner, and later taking over as executive chef in December 2011. Nat Harry serves as Revival's head mixologist, and Patrick Cress as Revival's sommelier. Revival's name both refers to the fact that the restaurant is housed in a Revival-era building, a reference to the days when Berkeley's downtown was a bustling place that attracted the rich and famous, and a reference to Amy Murray's hopes that her twin restaurants, Revival and Venus, will play a significant role in the revival of Berkeley's downtown food scene and downtown in general.

== Food ==
Revival uses whole animals sourced locally and during the appropriate season, although they also have a number of vegan and vegetarian options. Revival attempts to source all of their food within a one-hundred mile radius, and attempts to minimize their waste, describing their philosophy as "snout to tail" and "root to shoot." Revival features in-house charcuterie, as well as house-made cheeses, chutneys, and pasta. Revival's insistence on maintaining their sourcing standards means that some foods, such as goat, are only intermittently available, and that many vegetables are not available out of season.

== Drink ==
Revival's menu includes unique housemade cocktails, a selection of local beers, and a more than sixty bottle wine list. Nat Harry, Revival's head mixologist, won the East Bay Express' award for "Best Bartender" in 2012. The award describes Harry as "relentlessly adventurous" and as "the kind of bartender to whom you can rattle off a vague list of likes, dislikes, and current cravings and who will then make exactly the drink you didn't even know you wanted." Additionally, Harry has invested a significant amount of her time figuring out how to produce vegan versions of traditional favorites, a process which has required her to stock extensive supplies of alternative ingredients such as gelatin-free sakes, honey-free liquors, and char-free sugar, as well as to come up with suitable alternatives for ingredients which cannot be produced in a vegan fashion. Revival's wine menu focuses on small, family owned wineries (generally with production runs less than 10,000 cases) that have an emphasis on sustainable practices, and their beer menu focuses on local and unusual brews. Revival's sommelier also attempts to choose wines that are high quality while remaining affordable, so that his selection is accessible, rather than exclusive.
