= Master-McNeil =

Master-McNeil, Inc.
- Industry: Naming
- Founded: Berkeley, California, 1988
- Headquarters: Berkeley, California
- Website: www.naming.com

Master-McNeil, Inc. is an American naming agency. It was founded in 1988 by S.B. Master as one of the first firms formed exclusively for brand naming and research.

Master added "McNeil" to the company name because it "had a substantial sound" which led potential clients to assume that the company was "big and important, even though we weren't when we first started." Prior to founding Master-McNeil, Master was the president of Wordmark, a division of the San Francisco-based brand agency Landor Associates, where she named brands including Touchstone Pictures, Westin Hotels, Pacific Telesis Group/ Pacific Bell, Fleet Financial Group, and Asiana.

Master-McNeil's naming process includes linguistic analysis, brand architecture, trademark search and domain name acquisition. Among others, the company has named PayPal, We TV, the Buick Lacrosse, and Quid. Their clients have included AMD, Apple, Comcast, Chevron, General Motors, Kodak, Nestlé and Volkswagen.
