= Pacific Steel Casting Company =

Defunct steel mill

The Pacific Steel Casting Company (PSC) was a steel mill and foundry located at 1333 Second Street in West Berkeley, Berkeley, California. At one point it was the third largest steel foundry in the United States, employing 350 people.

The company was founded in 1934 by Douglas Genger and Ivan Johnson, who had lost their jobs at General Metals in nearby Oakland as a result of the Great Depression. They bought a steel foundry in West Berkeley that had been repossessed by Wells Fargo Bank, re-opening it as the Pacific Steel Casting Company. PSC's business took off with the advent of World War II. The company added another plant in 1974, and a third in 1981.

Pacific Steel lost a third of its workforce in 2011 after a U.S. Immigration and Customs enforcement audit.

In early 2014, the company filed for bankruptcy protection

On August 25, 2014 Speyside Equity acquires Pacific Steel Castings, now called Pacific Steel Castings LLC.

The company announced plans to close as early as December 2017, after having laid off most of the employees and selling much of their inventory.

It was purchased by Speyside Fund in 2014. In 2016 Speyside Fund lent Pacific Steel 3.95 million $US at 10% interest and it was repaid in 2018. The company declared bankruptcy in 2019. By March, 2019 the site was abandoned and the city of Berkeley was seeking input on what to do with the site located in the West Berkeley Neighborhood. Upon its bankruptcy only executives received severance whilst rank-and-file employees got nothing.
