= Gary Danko =

American chef

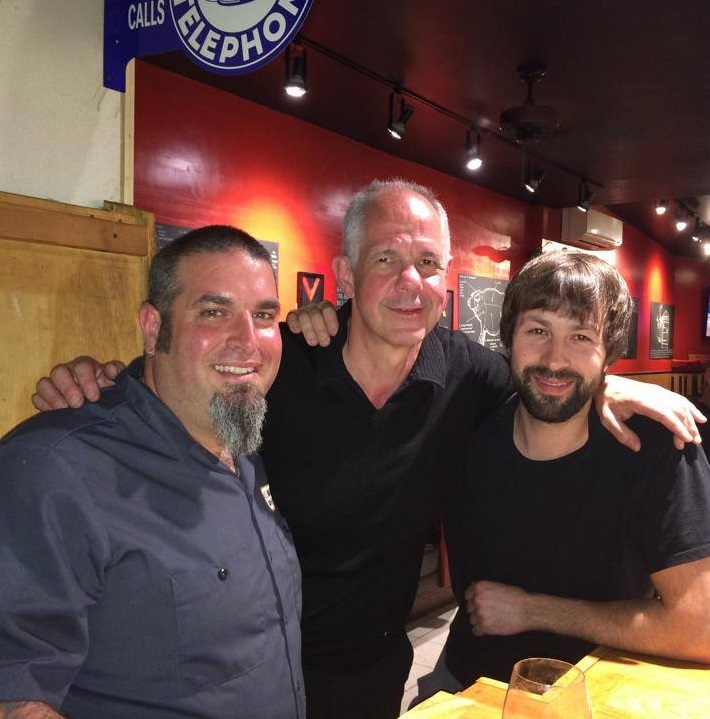
- Gary Danko (center) at B.T.'s Smokehouse in Sturbridge, Massachusetts
- Born: Massena, New York, U.S.
- Education: The Culinary Institute of America
- Culinary career
- Cooking style: French, Mediterranean, and American
- Rating(s): Michelin stars AAA Motor Club
- Current restaurant(s): Restaurant Gary Danko, San Francisco, California, United States (1999–present)
- Previous restaurants: *Beringer Vineyards, St. Helena, California (1985–1989); Chateau Souverain, Sonoma County, California (1989–1992); Terrace restaurant at the Ritz Carlton, San Francisco (1992–1999)
- Website: GaryDanko.com

Gary Danko is an American chef. He combines French, Mediterranean, and American styles into his cooking. He is best known for his eponymous restaurant in San Francisco, California.

== Early life ==
Danko was born in Massena, New York, his father was a Hungarian immigrant. His grandmother was Jewish and he grew up with Hungarian cooking with Jewish overtones.

== Culinary development ==
Danko started cooking at the local Village Inn restaurant at age 14. By the time he graduated high school, he had been exposed to every position in the restaurant. Danko completed his culinary education at the Hyde Park, New York campus of the Culinary Institute of America. He relocated to San Francisco in 1977 and worked as a waiter at the Waterfront Restaurant. Chef Danko returned to New York to enroll in Madeleine Kamman's class at Peter Kump's New York Cooking School in 1983. In 1985, Danko became the executive chef at Beringer Vineyards. He later became the executive chef at Chateau Souverain in Sonoma County. In 1992 Danko left to become the chef of the Terrace restaurant at the Ritz Carlton, San Francisco. He was then appointed the executive chef of the Dining Room at the Ritz Carlton, S.F.Ritz-Carlton. Gary opened his eponymous restaurant in 1999, and has won numerous awards, including a Michelin star first awarded in 2007.

== Restaurants ==
In 1999, Danko created his own restaurant, named for himself, near Fisherman's Wharf. Gary Danko has also made appearances as the featured chef on the Food Network and PBS. Restaurant Gary Danko has been a recipient of the Wine Spectator Grand Award since 2001. In 2002, the restaurant was designated one of 18 Relais & Chateaux properties in North America.

== Food ==
Diners select from three, four or five prix-fixe menu courses. Danko's signature dishes include roast Maine lobster with white corn, tarragon, and chanterelles, pancetta wrapped frog legs with garlic purée, and, before it was banned in California, roasted quail stuffed with mushrooms and foie gras. Most dishes are served year round, but ingredients are adjusted seasonally to emphasize local produce.

== Awards and honors ==
Year	Organization	Category
1995	James Beard Foundation	Best Chef-California
1999	Esquire	Best New Restaurant
1999	Mobil Travel Guide	First "Five Star" rating
2000	James Beard Foundation	Best New Restaurant
2000	San Francisco	Chef of the Year
2002	James Beard Foundation Award	Nominated Outstanding Chef of the Year
2002	Relais & Chateaux	Relais & Chateaux property
2007	Michelin Guide	One Star Rating
2007	Zagat Survey	Top Restaurant
2008	Michelin Guide	One Star Rating
2009	Michelin Guide	One Star Rating
2010	Michelin Guide	One Star Rating
2011	Michelin Guide	One Star Rating
2012	Michelin Guide	One Star Rating
2013	James Beard Foundation Award	Nominated Outstanding Chef of the Year
2013	Michelin Guide	One Star Rating
2014	Michelin Guide	One Star Rating
2015	Michelin Guide	One Star Rating
2016	Michelin Guide	One Star Rating
2017	Michelin Guide	One Star Rating
2018	Michelin Guide	One Star Rating
2019	Michelin Guide	One Star Rating
2020	Michelin Guide	One Star Rating
2021	Michelin Guide	One Star Rating
2022	Michelin Guide	One Star Rating
2023	Michelin Guide	One Star Rating

In 2024, it lost the Michelin star it had held for 17 straight years.
