= Moe's Books =

Bookstore in Berkeley, California

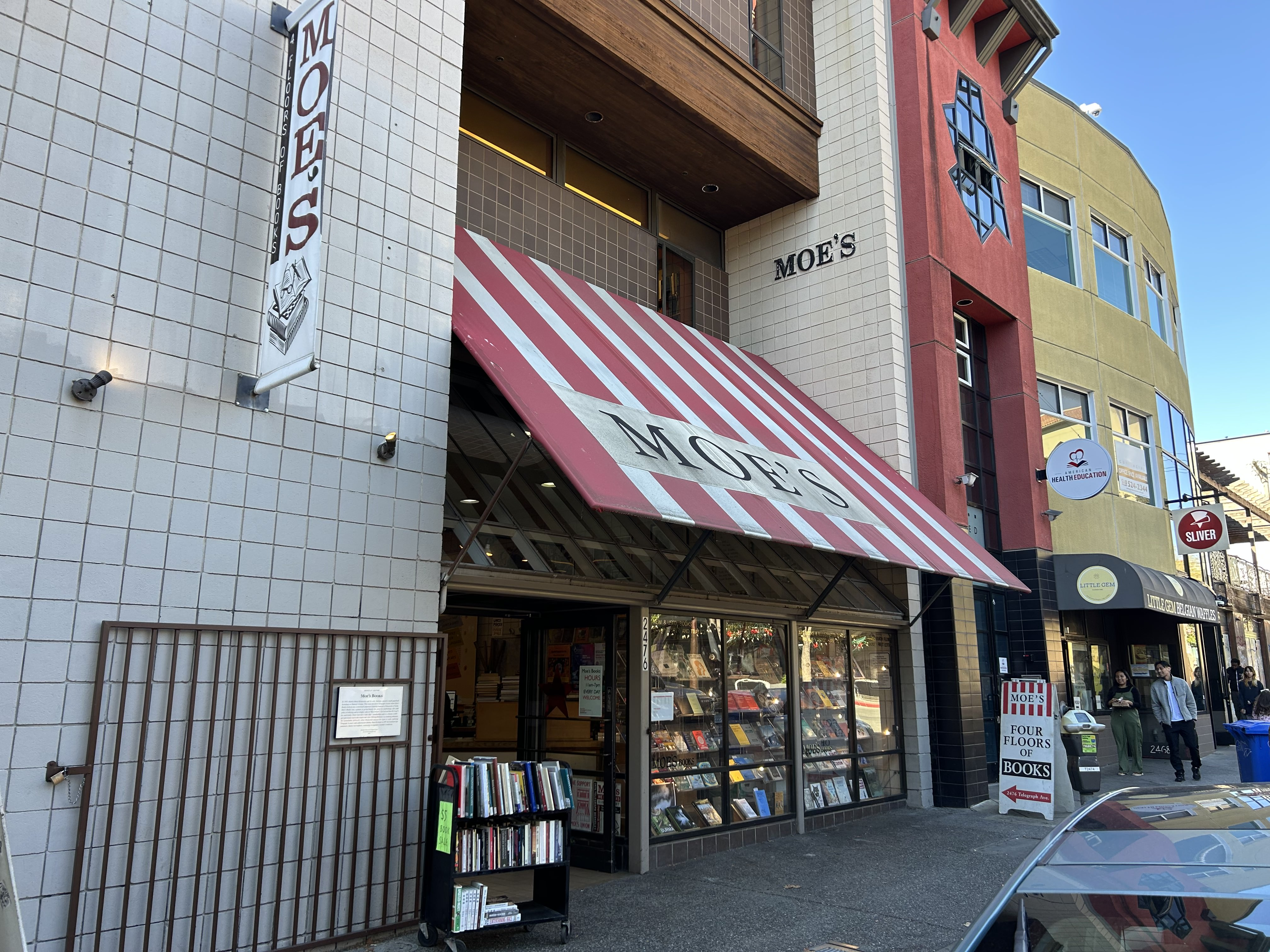
- Moe's Books storefront in 2024

General information
- Location: 2476 Telegraph Avenue; Berkeley, California, US

Moe's Books is an American bookstore near the University of California, Berkeley, located on Telegraph Avenue. With four floors, the bookstore stocks over 200,000 new and used books in various genres. Founded in 1959, it is considered by many news outlets to be one of San Francisco Bay Area's historic and culturally significant bookstores.

== History ==
=== 1959–2020: founding, Telegraph Avenue location, book theft ===
The bookstore was founded by Moe and Barbara Moskowitz in 1959, with its original location on Shattuck Avenue in Berkeley, California. The bookstore was founded partly due to Moe Moskowitz's dissatisfaction with trade-in values at other American bookstores. In the 1960s, it moved to its current location on Telegraph Avenue, where it shared a building with Print Mint until the latter moved out in 1966.

Moe Moskowitz ran the bookstore until his death in 1997, after which his daughter, Doris Moskowitz, took over. In 2014, the Berkeley Historical Society installed a plaque outside of the bookstore in Moe Moskowitz's honor. In 2016, Doris Moskowitz published the book Radical Bookselling: A Life of Moe Moskowitz in honor of her father and the history of Moe's Books.

In 2016, a van full of rare books valued at around $350,000 total, owned by bookseller Lawrence Van De Carr, was stolen in Oakland, California. Van De Carr immediately reported it to the Antiquarian Booksellers' Association of America, which issued an alert to nearby booksellers. Two men, Joshua Anderson and a since-unidentified accomplice, attempted to sell some of the stolen books to Moe's Books, including first editions of No Country for Old Men by Cormac McCarthy and Pylon by William Faulkner, claiming that the books had been previously owned by their uncle. Some of the employees at Moe's Books, who had received the alert, directed the two men to the bookstore's rare books section to stall for time, while notifying police. Anderson was ultimately arrested after attempting to flee the bookstore through the front, while his accomplice managed to escape through the back.

Many notable figures have worked with Moe's Books and/or Moe Moskowitz. Steve Wasserman, the publisher at Heyday Books, wrote about the bookstore in his memoir, Tell Me Something, Tell Me Anything, Even If It’s a Lie, crediting Moskowitz for his education in bookselling and literature. Bob Baldock and Jonathan Lethem both worked at the bookstore for a few years.

=== 2020–present: COVID-19 and union ===
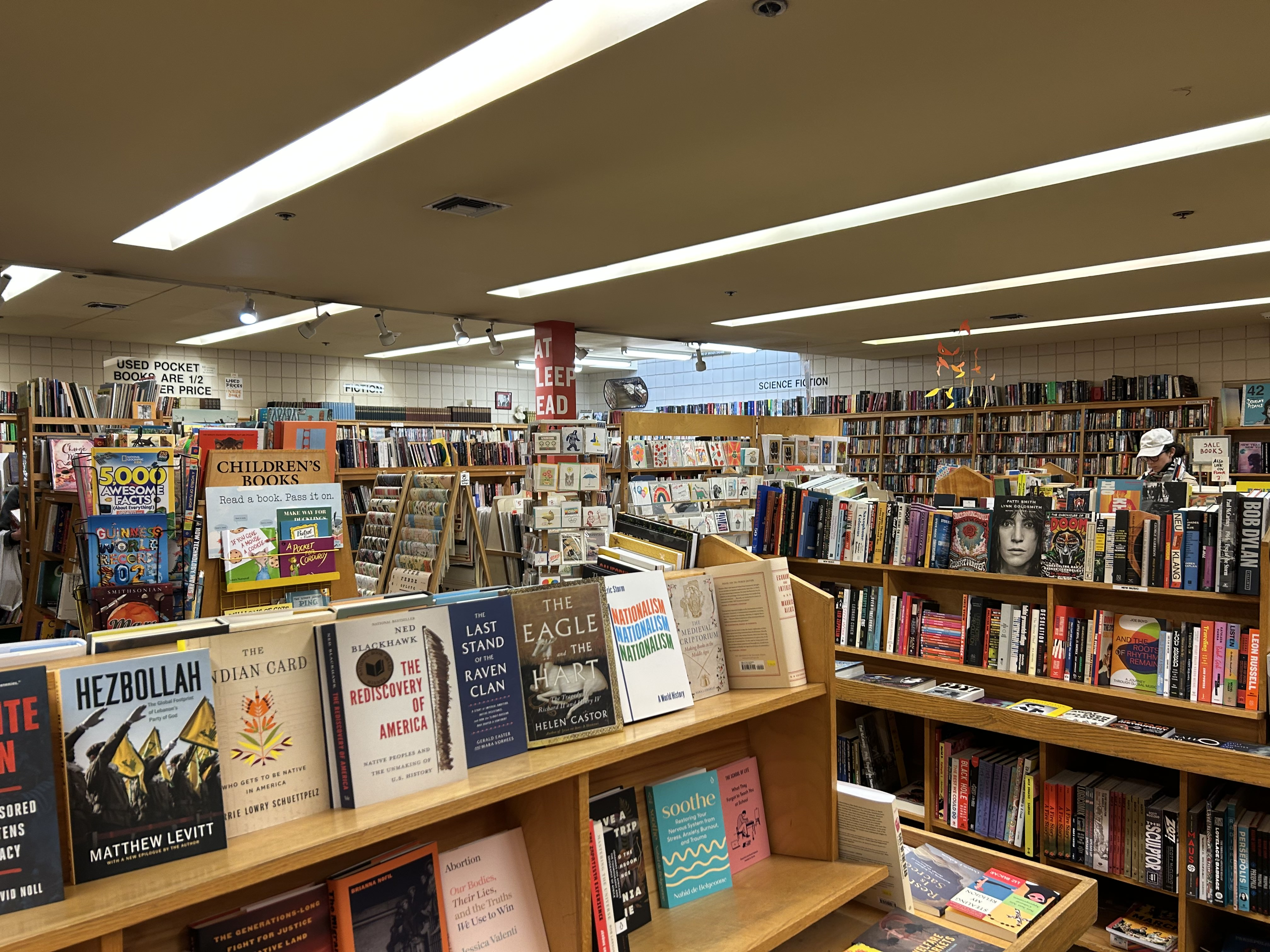
The first floor of Moe's Books, stocking children's books, trade fiction, and genres

In 2020, the bookstore set up a GoFundMe to ensure its survival through the COVID-19 pandemic with a fundraising goal of $100,000. The same year, on March 9, Moe's Books staff unionized and joined the Industrial Workers of the World due to concerns over safety protocols. Having failed to unionize a decade before, the staff received helpful input and guidance from fellow booksellers at Elliott Bay Book Company and Bookshop Santa Cruz.

After some troubles between staff and management, including an incident where management fired a new employee after telling him not to speak to union members, Doris Moskowitz eventually recognized the union with a contract in 2021. In 2022, Kalie McGiurl, a book worker and union member, chronicled the Moe's Books union's experiences on the Verso Books website.

Due to e-commerce, as well as urban decay on Telegraph Avenue, Moe's Books remains one of the few bookstores near University of California, Berkeley, still open. Due to its collection of books, totaling over 200,000, and its number of staff, with around 25 employees, it is considered the biggest bookstore in the San Francisco Bay Area.

== Media ==
Afar included the bookstore on their list of favorite bookstores in California. Several publications, including Alta Journal, East Bay Times, Sacramento Bee, CBS, and 7x7, have recommended the bookstore on their respective lists for bookstores in the San Francisco Bay Area.

The bookstore appears in a scene of the 1967 film The Graduate.
