= Pascal Rigo =

French businessman

- Born: 4 September 1960 (age 65); Fort-Lamy, Chad
- Education: MACI-BEM.Master in International Trade- CAP Boulanger
- Occupation: Baker. SVP Starbucks
- Known for: Owner of The Bay Bread Group and La Boulange

Pascal Rigo (born 4 September 1960) is a French Restaurateur who owns a small "empire" of boulangeries, restaurants, and wholesale and retail bakeries in San Francisco and Mill Valley, California, that operate as La Boulangerie de San Francisco, Bay Bread, La Boulange, and (formerly) Cortez, Chez Nous, Gallette, and others.

== Early life ==
Pascal Rigo was born in N'Djamena, formally known as Fort-Lamy. At the age of 7, after running a daily errand to buy two baguettes for his family, Rigo apprenticed at his village's bakery. He later earned a business degree from the University of Bordeaux and became a certified professional baker. Rigo first moved to California to begin importing local wine from France. He stayed in the U.S. to open a bakery in Los Angeles and later moved to San Francisco.

== Bakery ==
In 1996, Rigo founded Panissimo Group, which ran the bakery on Pine Street that later became Bay Bread. He chose to live and have an office at the central location in a former French laundry on the busy thoroughfare. Rigo also bought and continues to operate San Francisco's oldest flour mill, which Bay Bread uses to produce organic flour for its loaves. Rigo originally intended to operate his business as a wholesale bakery, but soon began selling loaves and then croissants directly to the public. A positive review in the San Francisco Examiner initially popularized the bakery. Rigo renamed it the "Boulangerie" after painting the word on the colorful awning over the sidewalk, and then opened similarly themed dine-in bakeries throughout the city. One, in Cole Valley, is the site of the former Tassajara Bakery, where San Francisco's modern artisan bread movement began.

In the late 1990s and early 2000s, Rigo and his business partners invested in and founded a number of restaurants, including Soleil, Rigolo, Gallette, La Table, Le Petit Robert, Chez Nous, Americano, and Plantanos. One of these restaurants, Cortez, earned a Michelin Star. In 2001, Rigo and partners bought Oh-La-La, one of San Francisco's oldest coffee house chains. The group later divested of most of its restaurants to concentrate on its bakeries. In 2009, they bought a share of Miette, a small chain of candy stores and cupcake bakers.

In addition to its retail operations, the company supplies bread to grocery stores, restaurants, and hotels in the area. Some rival food entrepreneurs in San Francisco's small French entrepreneur community have criticized Rigo for his fast expansion efforts. The New York Times called Rigo "the only real entrepreneur" among the community. Rigo has intentionally avoided publicity to avoid encouraging a backlash from critics.

In 2003 Rigo co-wrote a cookbook titled "The American Boulangerie: Authentic French Pastries and Breads for the Home Kitchen."

On June 4, 2012, Rigo sold La Boulange Bakery to Starbucks for $100 million. However, in June 2015, Starbucks announced it would close all of its La Boulange cafes by the end of September 2015.

Later, Rigo announced plans to re-open six of the La Boulange locations under the name "La Boulangerie de San Francisco."
