= Boudin Bakery =

Californian baked good company

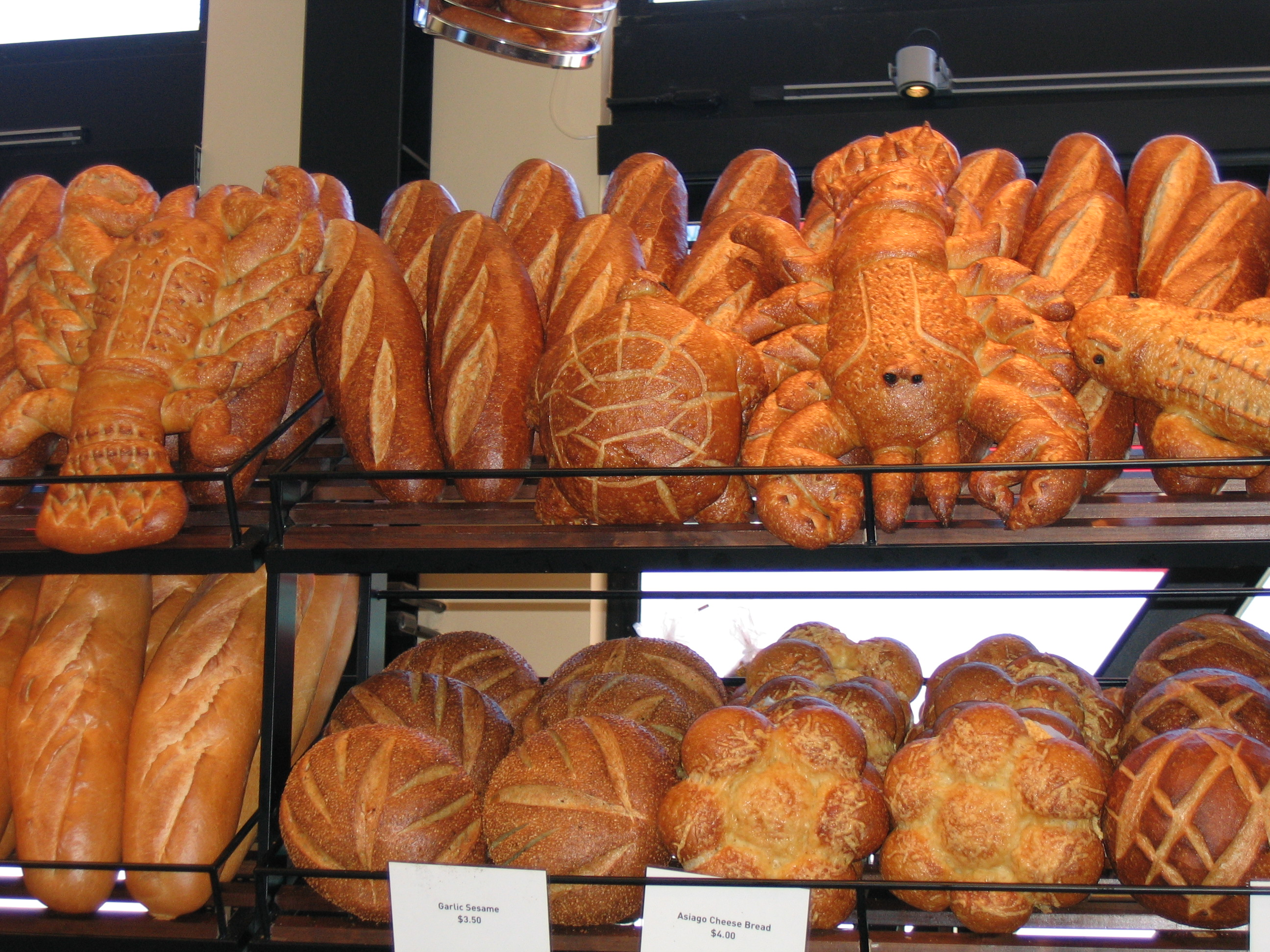
- A rack of bread in the flagship bakery in Fisherman's Wharf, San Francisco.
- Type: Private
- Industry: Food manufacture
- Founded: 1849; 177 years ago
- Founder: Isidore Boudin
- Headquarters: San Francisco, California
- Area served: California
- Key people: Daniel Giraudo (Owner & CEO)
- Products: Baked goods
- Owner: Daniel Giraudo
- Parent: Boudin Holdings Inc.
- Website: www.boudinbakery.com

Boudin Bakery (Anglicized pronunciation: boo-DIN) is a bakery based in San Francisco, California, known for its sourdough bread (trademarked as "The Original San Francisco Sourdough"). The bakery is recognized as the "oldest continually operating business in San Francisco."

== History ==
Boudin Bakery was established in 1849 by Isidore Boudin, son of a family of master bakers from Burgundy, France, by blending the sourdough prevalent among miners in the Gold Rush with French techniques.

Steven Giraudo, an artisan baker from Italy whose first job in America was at Boudin, bought the bakery in 1941 but later sold it in 1993 after Boudin became the cornerstone of the San Francisco Frenchbread Company. After a series of ownership changes the bakery was reacquired by Steven Giraudo's son Lou Giraudo in 2002. Currently, it is owned and operated by Steven’s grandson, Daniel. Under Daniel's leadership Boudin's products are available globally through Costco, Safeway and other grocery retailers.

The bakery has locations on Fisherman's Wharf near San Francisco Bay and at Disney California Adventure Park as well as 30 other cafés throughout California. The main bakery in San Francisco is in the Richmond District on the corner of 10th Avenue and Geary Boulevard. The Boudin Bakery hosts the attraction "The Bakery Tour" at Disney California Adventure, where guests are shown how sourdough bread is produced. The bakery still uses the same starter yeast-bacteria culture it developed during the California Gold Rush.

The first outlet outside California was established in 1979 in the Yorktown Center mall in Lombard, Illinois. It closed in mid-2009. The bakery is recognized as the "oldest continually operating business in San Francisco."

== See also ==
- Colombo Baking Company, established 1896 in Oakland
- Renato Turano, President and CEO of Turano Baking Company
- List of bakery cafés
