= Rocknroll Blitzkrieg Records =

American record label

Rocknroll Blitzkrieg Records was an independent record label from Berkeley, California, that put out garage rock music.

== History ==
Mark Murrmann founded the label in the late 1990s while working at Maximumrocknroll magazine. At MRR he was exposed to a high volume of garage rock bands. Murrmann vouched to only sign bands “great enough to be on a label boldly called Rocknroll Blitzkrieg.” Every record they put out was in vinyl form. In 2003, Murrmann folded the company and decided to focus on his career in photography.

== Artists ==
- Henry Fiats Open Sore
- John Wilkes Booze
- The Piranhas
- The Static
- The Upskirts
- Welfare
- X
