= Laurent Manrique =

French Michelin-starred chef

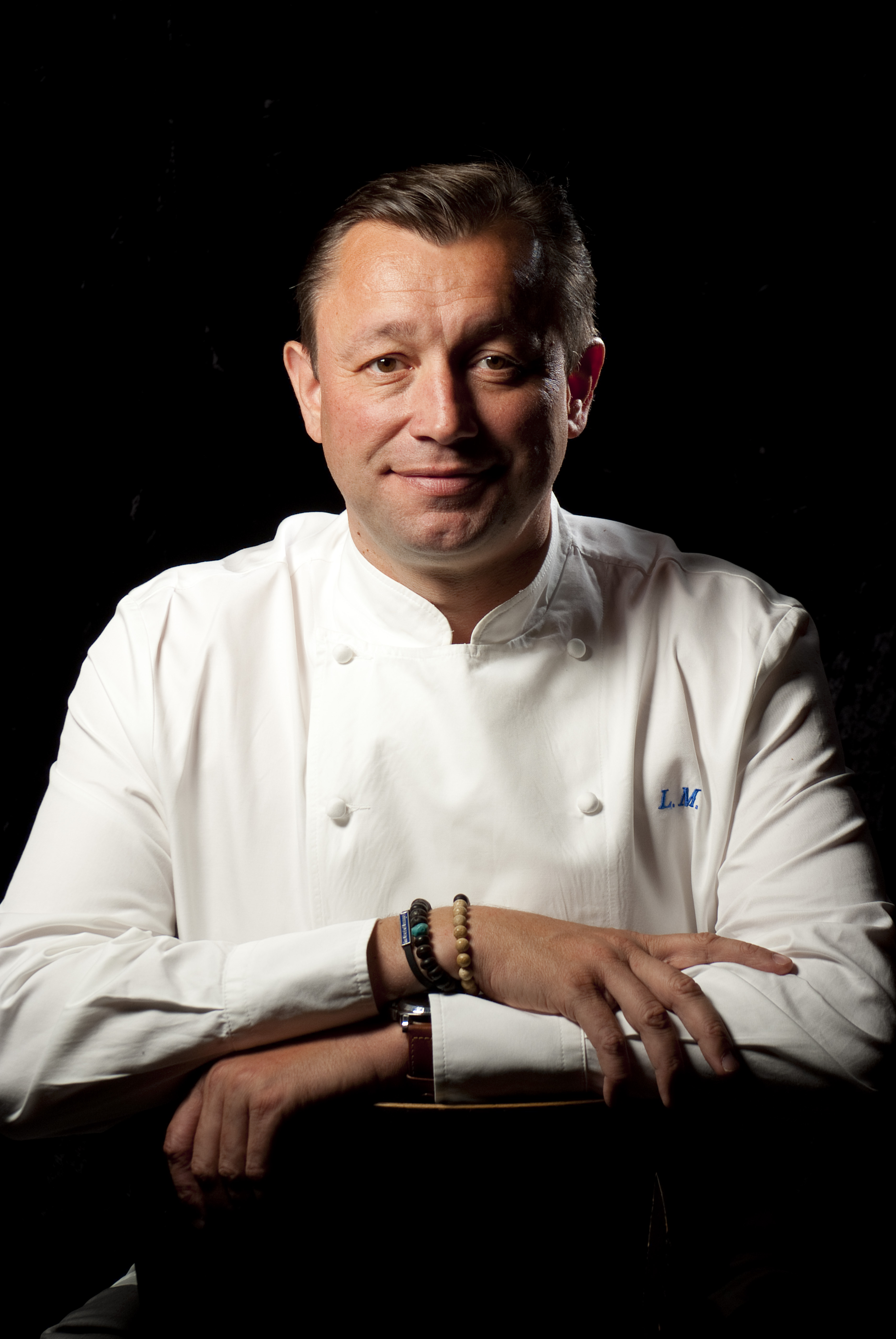
- Born: March 30, 1966 (age 60); Lombez, France
- Spouse: Michelle Odom Manrique
- Culinary career
- Cooking style: French cuisine
- Rating: Michelin stars
- Current restaurants: *Cafe de la Presse, San Francisco *Las Rosadas, Mexico *Aqua Culture Food, *Maison des Chefs, Vlorë
- Previous restaurants: *Herlen Place, San Francisco *Fifth Floor, San Francisco *Aqua, San Francisco *Campton Place San Francisco *Gertrude's, New York City *Peacock Alley, New York City *Le Taillevent, Paris
- Television show: Top Chef
- Website: laurentmanrique.com

Laurent Manrique (born March 30, 1966) is a French restaurateur and Michelin-starred chef. He is involved with projects in San Francisco and Mexico .

== Biography ==
Laurent Manrique learned of his love for cooking while growing up in the Gascon village of Roques. Preparing meals with his grandmother Aurélie awakened his awareness of his passion for the craft, while giving him inspiration for the signature pot-au-feu that appears on nearly all of his menus

Embarking on a culinary career at age 14 led him to an apprenticeship with Master Chef Roger Duffour, followed by training in Paris, where he worked with Master Chefs Yan Jacquot and Claude Deligne at Michelin-starred Le Taillevent and Toit de Passy. Under the encouragement of Master Chef Michel Rostang, Manrique came to Los Angeles in 1989 to work at restaurants Fennel and Rex.

Manrique moved to New York City in 1991 to take over as Le Grand Comptoir's Executive Chef. His time at the renowned bistro was followed by an executive chef position at the Waldorf Astoria's famed Peacock Alley. In 1998, Manrique was named as Bon Appetit's Rising Star Chef. Soon after, the west coast beckoned and he left New York in 1999 to join San Francisco's Campton Place as Executive Chef where he earned the luxurious restaurant high rankings in both Gourmet's “Top 10 Best Restaurants in the Bay Area,” and Food and Wine's “50 Best Hotel Restaurants.”

In the spring of 2003, he joined Aqua as Corporate Executive Chef, earning it a 3½-star rating from the San Francisco Chronicle and third place ranking on the Wine Spectator's “San Francisco's Best Restaurants” list as well as inclusion in Robb Report's “Best of the Best of 2004,” San Francisco Magazine's “2004 Best in Chow” and 7×7 Magazine's “Best Business Lunch.” In 2006, the Michelin Guide honored Aqua with two stars, giving Manrique the distinction of being the only French chef in the region to have done so. Aqua earned two stars again in 2007 and 2008. In 2011 Manrique was appointed to the class of Master Chefs admitted to the prestigious Association des Maîtres Cuisiniers de France. As well as consulting on various food and beverage projects, Manrique previously partnered with the historic Carlton hotel on Madison Avenue to open Millésime, an upscale seafood brasserie in November 2010 and was named one of New York's Best New Restaurants 2011 by Esquire magazine. Since 2003, Manrique has been involved in vineyards in California, France, and Spain, where he has been instrumental in the creation of several wines. Manrique partnered with Master Sommelier Emmanuel Kemiji and a vineyard in Spain, Clos Oblidat and Arrels (which means roots of a vine in Catalan) is the inaugural release.

In 2005 Manrique opened Café de la Presse, San Francisco's celebrated Parisian-inspired bistro that enjoys the distinction of being among the city's most popular dining destinations. Three years later saw the opening of the wine bar Blanc et Rouge. Manrique continued his love of wine bars by opening Aquitaine Wine Bistro in April 2014. Laurent Manrique is a member of the Association des Maitres Cuisiniers de France as well as a Knight of the Order of Agricultural Merit (Chevalier du Mérite Agricole).

In 2019, Laurent and his wife Michelle discovered a magic place called “Las Rosadas” in Bahia de Chamela, Mexico. Shortly after, Las Rosadas and Laurent entered in a partnership that has elevated the Ocean Club experience. In May 2021, Laurent became the culinary adviser for Scott's Chowder House and opened multiple locations in San Francisco and San Jose, CA. This year, Laurent and his long time friend and master chef from France Olivier Dubreuil, launched a new project called “ La Maison des Chefs at Home ” making traditional meals in a jar. He also became the culinary advisor for Aqua Culture Food. Manrique's passion for cuisine includes an emphasis on philanthropy, where he employs his cooking abilities for a variety of causes. Though he regularly contributes to many local charities and fundraising events, of particular note is his own creation, “Taste and Tribute,” a bi-annual benefit convening 18 renowned chefs for the Berkeley-based Tibetan Aid Project. Manrique is a long-time supporter of Meals on Wheels and Project Open Hand in San Francisco.

== Personal life ==
Manrique is married to writer Michelle Odom Manrique, and makes his home with their children in northern California.
