= Semifreddi's Bakery =

- Type: Private
- Industry: Bread
- Founded: 1984
- Headquarters: Alameda, CA
- Area served: San Francisco Bay Area
- Key people: Tom Frainier, President and CEO; Mike Rose; John Tredgold
- Revenue: ~15 million
- Owner: Tom Frainier (aka Chief Boot Licker), Barbara Rose, and Michael Rose
- Number of employees: ~125
- Website: www.semifreddis.com

Semifreddi's Bakery is an Alameda-based artisan bakery that serves the entire San Francisco Bay Area. The name Semifreddi means "half-frozen" in Italian.

== Beginnings and early history ==
In 1984, Eric and Carole Sartenaer, ex-Cheese Board Collective members, opened shop in a 450-square-foot "hole in the wall" bakery in Kensington, California. In January 1987, Barbara Frainier (one of their first employees) took over the business with her husband Michael Rose. In 1988, Tom Frainier (Barbara’s brother) joined the Semifreddi's team. In order to save money, Tom, Barbara, and Michael, lived together in a small flat in Berkeley, California. Tom, who holds an MBA from Berkeley’s Haas School of Business, left an upper management position at Clorox to join his sister and brother in law, both UC Berkeley alumni, in the bread and pastry-making business. When asked about his exit strategy, Frainier replies, "death". After Frainier took the helm as President, CEO, and self-proclaimed, "Chief Boot Licker", Semifreddi's rapidly expanded throughout the San Francisco Bay, while maintaining its emphasis on baking high-quality, European-style artisan bread and pastries.

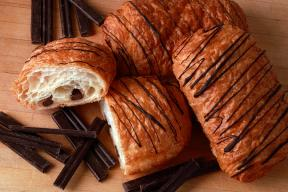
Semifreddi’s Chocolate Croissant

== Present day ==
Sold in 2024 Semifreddi's has become one of the largest artisan wholesale bread and pastry bakeries in the Bay Area. It is located in Alameda, California. Semifreddi’s and Acme are the two major players in the San Francisco Bay bread industry. In 2009, Semifreddi’s moved into a 33,000 square foot facility, where the bakery recycles 95 percent of its waste. It operates 24 hours a day, 7 days a week, for all 52 weeks of the year. The bakery utilizes over 25 different recipes and bakes more than 50 different artisan breads and pastries. In a typical week, Semifreddi's bakes and delivers over 200,000 baguettes, rolls, and loaves and 40,000 pastries and cookies a week. Semifreddi's sells to grocery stores, restaurants, and cafés throughout the bay area.

== Baked goods ==
Semifreddi's bakes French and Italian style bread and pastries, which includes baguettes, loaves, batards, and French style pastries. They also bake croutons, cookies, and various seasonal sweets.
