= Colombo Baking Company =

Bakery in Oakland, California, United States

- Industry: Baking
- Founded: 1896; 130 years ago
- Defunct: November 2012
- Fate: Liquidated by Hostess
- Headquarters: United States
- Parent: San Francisco French Bread Company

Colombo Baking Company was a bakery founded in 1896, known for its sourdough bread. Located at 580 Julie Ann Way in Oakland, California, it became a wholly owned division of Hostess Brands. Colombo sourdough rolls were manufactured at a satellite bakery in Sacramento, California. Along with Toscana bakery of Oakland and Parisian bakery of San Francisco, Colombo became part of the San Francisco French Bread Company (SFFBC) which was acquired by Hostess in 1994. The brands competed locally in the San Francisco Bay Area. As a result of Hostess liquidating the company, Colombo shuttered its operation in November, 2012. The SFFBC, through Colombo's bakery, was the maker of Emperor Norton San Francisco Sourdough Snacks, which ceased production in 2012, prior to the Hostess liquidation.

The Colombo brand was acquired by Bimbo Bakeries USA in August 2014.

== References in popular culture ==
A shopping bag of the bakery's Parisian brand bread is central to the plot of the 1997 theatrical film Home Alone 3. The character Hess (Marian Seldes) buys loaves of the said bread, which she carries in the brand's French-flag design shopping bag, while a quartet of internationally wanted high-profile criminals uses an identical shopping bag of the same brand to smuggle a stolen highly-classified military computer chip (which they intend to hand over to a notorious terrorist organization) inside a radio-controlled car. The two bags get mixed up at airport security, and the terrorists are thwarted in retrieving the car because a large number of people in the airport terminal have bags from the bakery.

== See also ==
- History of California bread
