= Acme Bread Company =

Commercial bakery based in Berkeley, California

- Type: Private
- Industry: Food production
- Founded: 1983
- Founder: Steve Sullivan
- Headquarters: Berkeley, California, USA
- Area served: California
- Key people: Steve Sullivan, Founder and President
- Products: Bread
- Revenue: $14.5 million
- Number of employees: 168
- Website: acmebread.com

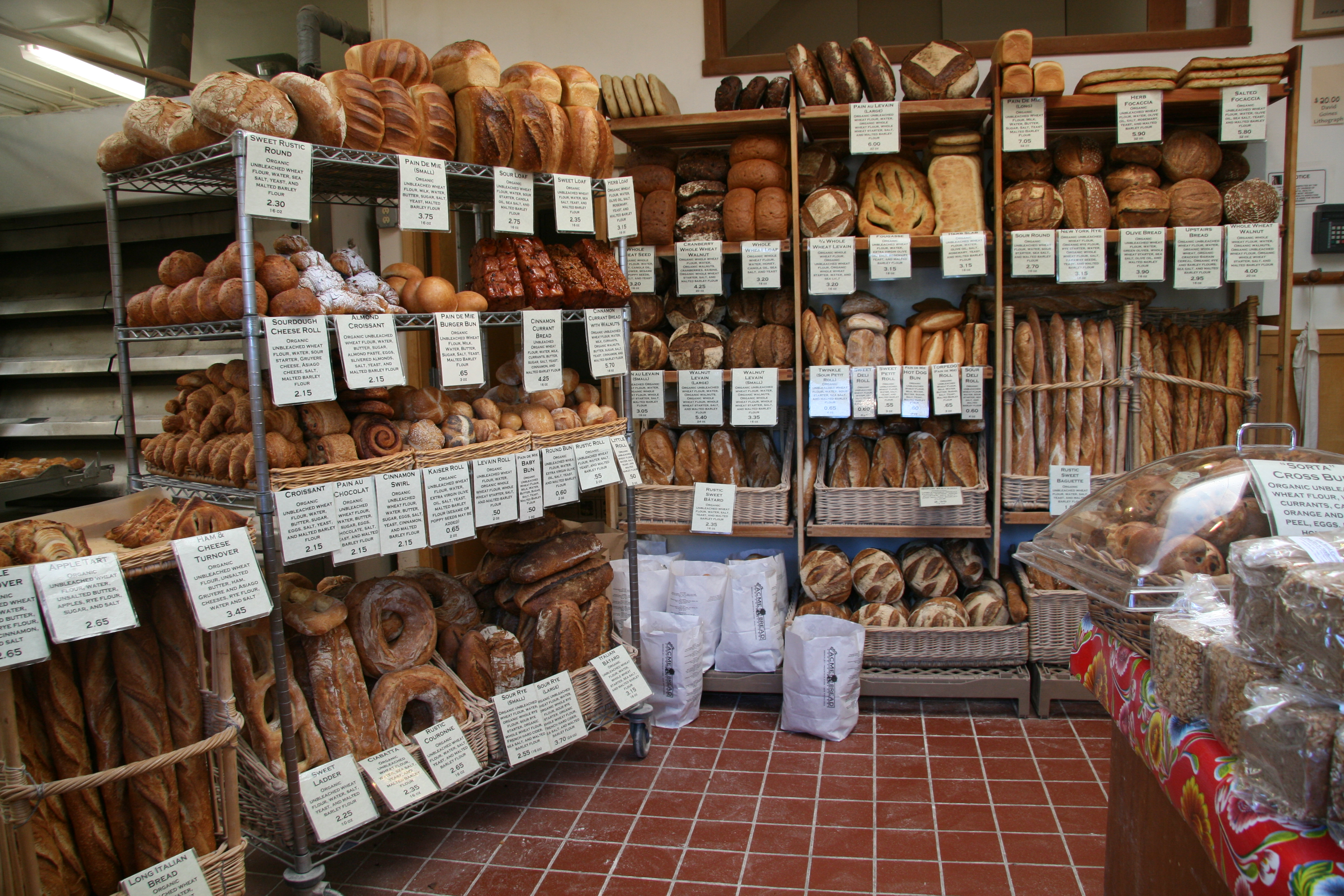
Acme interior

The Acme Bread Company (also known as Acme Bread) is a Berkeley, California-based bakery that is one of the pioneers of the San Francisco Bay Area's "Bread Revolution", which in turn created the modern "artisan bread" movement in America, and remains a "benchmark" for commercial handmade bread.

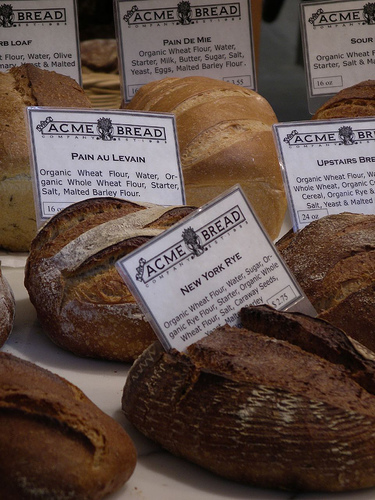
Acme bread loaves on display at Ferry Building retail shop in San Francisco

== Etymology ==
Acme (ακμή; English transliteration: akmē) is Ancient Greek for "(highest) point, edge; peak of anything", being used in English with the meaning of "prime" or "the best", initially when referring to a period in someone's life and then extending to anything or anyone who reaches perfection in a certain regard.

== Origin ==
Founder Steve Sullivan grew up in Los Gatos, California, and enrolled at the University of California, Berkeley in 1975, intending to major in rhetoric. He earned money as a busboy at Chez Panisse. While riding his bike through England during a summer trip to Europe he bought English Bread and Yeast Cookery, Elizabeth David's 1977 book on breadmaking and bread history. Excited by the book, and wanting to recreate the bread he had enjoyed in Paris, he began experimenting with baking for himself. In 1979, when Chez Panisse's then-supplier, the Cheese Board Collective, could not keep up with its demands, Sullivan became the restaurant's in-house breadmaker. However, his breadmaking and the restaurant's food preparation were both competing for the restaurant's limited physical space. In 1983 he left, with the restaurant's encouragement, to open his own company, Acme. Jeremiah Tower, then head chef, encouraged Sullivan to study breadmaking at Narsai David's bakery. He and wife Susan launched Acme with approximately $180,000 of seed capital, half funded by Doobie Brothers guitarist Patrick Simmons through a leaseback arrangement.

Steve and Susan Sullivan took a honeymoon in France the year before starting the business. During their visit to a winery in Bandol, the son of the owners suggested they make their mother starter from the natural yeast of wine grapes. On returning home, he made the starter Acme continues to use in all of its bakeries by collecting unsulfured Cabernet Sauvignon and Zinfandel grapes from a vineyard his father owned, and adding them to a flour and water mixture.

== Products ==
Acme sells bread (including baguettes and batards, rolls, pastries, chocolate and plain croissants, and croutons. The primary products are made in either sourdough or "sweet" white bread, but other dough styles are offered such as multi-grain and walnut levain. Loaves are sold only whole and not sliced.

After two years of study and planning the company switched to organic wheat flour in 1999.

== Operations ==
Acme operates four bakeries. It opened a wholesale-only bakery in Berkeley in 1989, a bakery in Mountain View in 1996 relocated to South San Francisco in 2016, and a bakery and retail outlet in San Francisco as part of the 2004 Ferry Building renovation. Acme also regularly sells baked goods at the Ferry Plaza Farmers Market in San Francisco, and the farmers' markets in Sunnyvale and Mountain View. The main Berkeley bakery runs 24 hours per day in three shifts, seven days per week. The San Francisco location bakes only during daytime. The larger bakeries each produce 60,000 or more loaves of bread per week.

Acme's sourdough loaves take 35 hours of prep before baking. First, yeast from the mother starter is blended with additional flour and water to create a 60-pound "sponge," which is kept refrigerated for 12 hours. The sponge is then blended with 240 pounds of additional flour and water, and salt, then hand-formed into loaves. Bread is baked in a large brick oven with a rotating slab and steam humidifiers to keep optimal humidity and produce the crust.

Acme does almost no marketing. With no salespeople or marketing staff, it conducts a retail sales operation at its San Francisco and Berkeley bakeries and more than 80% of total sales are to the wholesale market, primarily local restaurants and markets. Boulevard and Farallon, two fine dining customers, each spend approximately $60,000 per year on Acme bread. The successful Ferry Building retail shop, though the most visible to tourists and residents alike, is a relatively small part of Acme's overall operations.

Acme breads are supplied to about 40 restaurants and stores in Sacramento by an agent, a former computer operator who collects them in Berkeley each morning and who also sells up to a dozen loaves a day to personal customers in Roseville who arrange to pick them up from his doorstep; he formerly ran a store there.

== See also ==
- History of California bread
- List of bakeries
