= List of companies based in San Francisco =

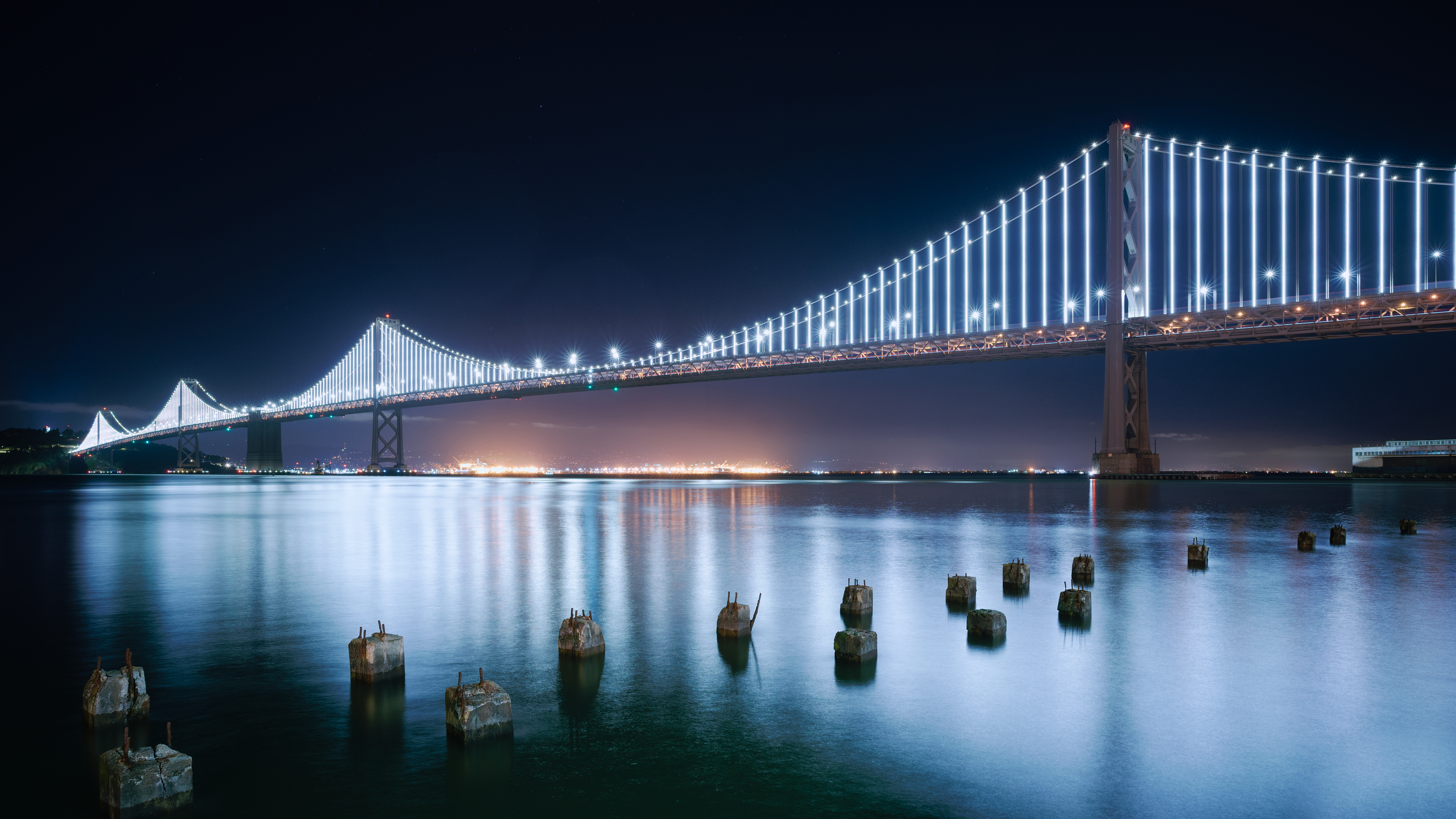
San Francisco–Oakland Bay Bridge in San Francisco

The following is a list of companies based in San Francisco, California. Fortune 500 rankings are indicated in parentheses, based on the list of the Fortune 500 companies in 2024.

== Companies currently based in San Francisco ==
=== Advertising ===
- 140 Proof
- AKQA
- Goodby, Silverstein & Partners
- Landor Associates
- Mullen
- Traction

=== Artificial intelligence and robotics ===
- OpenAI
- Anthropic

=== Automotive ===
- Cruise Automation
- Otto (company)

=== Banks ===
- Bank of the Orient
- Bank of the West (BancWest)
- UnionBanCal Corporation
- Wells Fargo

=== Beverages (alcoholic) ===
- Anchor Brewing Company
- Speakeasy Ales and Lagers

=== Beverages (non-alcoholic) ===
- Hint Water

=== Boat ===
- Navier Boat

=== Broadcasting and cable TV ===
- Northern California Public Broadcasting
- Pac-12 Network

=== Business services ===
- Ammunition Design Group
- Coursmos
- Duane Morris
- Elanex
- Gensler
- Morrison & Foerster
- Orrick, Herrington & Sutcliffe
- Sparkpr

=== Communications equipment ===
- Boombotix
- Riverbed Technology

=== Computer services ===
- Affirm Holdings
- AfterCollege
- AllBusiness.com
- Automattic
- Bebo
- Bleacher Report
- Chegg
- Clinkle
- Cloudflare
- Cotap
- Craigslist
- CrowdFlower
- Digg
- Disqus
- Dropbox
- Dropcam, Inc.
- DocuSign
- Eventbrite, Inc.
- Fandom
- Fitbit
- Flexport
- Grammarly
- Hack Reactor
- Hired
- HubPages
- IGN Entertainment
- imgur
- Indiegogo
- Instacart
- Internet Archive
- Joyent
- Kink.com
- Kongregate
- LiveJournal
- Lucidworks
- Lyft
- Meraki
- Mevio
- Mimecast
- Nextdoor
- ON24
- OpenDNS
- Pinterest
- Pogo.com
- Postmates
- Practice Fusion
- Prezi
- Quantcast
- Reddit
- Revision3
- Salesforce.com
- SAY Media
- Sidecar
- Slack
- Splunk
- StumbleUpon
- Talenthouse
- Technorati
- Trulia
- Twitch
- Uber
- Ustream
- ViacomCBS Streaming
- Whiskey Media
- Wolfgang's Vault
- Yammer
- Yelp
- YouNoodle
- Zedo

=== Construction ===
- Gensler
- Swinerton
- T. Y. Lin International
- URS

=== Consumer financial services ===
- Chime
- Earnest
- LendUp
- SoFi
- Stripe
- SyntheticFi

=== Food ===
- Big Heart Pet Brands
- Boudin Bakery
- Del Monte
- DoorDash
- Double Rainbow (ice cream)
- Diamond Foods
- Driscoll's
- Eatsa
- Guittard Chocolate Company
- Jack & Jason's Pancakes & Waffles
- La Boulange
- OLLY
- TCHO
- Traveling Spoon

=== Hospitals ===
- California Pacific Medical Center
- Dignity Health
  - Saint Francis Memorial Hospital
  - St. Mary's Medical Center
- University of California, San Francisco
  - UCSF Medical Center
  - UCSF Benioff Children's Hospital

=== Hospitality ===
- Airbnb
- Joie de Vivre Hospitality
- Kimpton Hotels & Restaurants

=== Insurance (accident and health) ===
- Blue Shield of California
- State Compensation Insurance Fund

=== Insurance (property and casualty) ===
- Esurance
- Metromile

=== Investment services ===
- BV Capital
- Golden Gate Capital
- Linqto
- Liquid Realty Partners
- Thomas Weisel Partners
- Wells Fargo
- WR Hambrecht + Co

=== Motion pictures ===
- American Zoetrope
- Dolby Laboratories
- Industrial Light & Magic
- LucasArts
- Lucasfilm

=== Personal and household products ===
- JUUL
- Method Products

=== Public benefit ===
- CraigsList
- Daylight Computer Co.
- Electronic Frontier Foundation
- Kiva
- The Sierra Club
- Skoll Foundation
- TechSoup.org
- Wikimedia Foundation

=== Publishing and printing ===
- Afar
- Blurb
- Capra Press
- Chronicle Books
- Dwell
- McSweeney's
- Mother Jones
- PC World
- VIZ Media
- Wired
- XLR8R

=== Real estate ===
- Digital Realty
- Jay Paul Company
- LiquidSpace
- LoopNet
- Pier 39
- Prologis

=== Recreational activities ===
- Club One
- Hornblower Cruises
- Golden State Warriors
- San Francisco 49ers
- San Francisco Giants
- SHN

=== Resource recovery ===
- Recology

=== Resource sharing ===
- Getaround
- RelayRides
- Turo

=== Retail (apparel & shoes) ===
- Allbirds
- Banana Republic
- Everlane
- Stitch Fix
- Gap Inc.
- Jessica McClintock
- Levi Strauss & Co.
- ModCloth
- Old Navy
- Rothy's
- Tea Collection
- Thrasher
- ThirdLove
- Athleta
- The RealReal

=== Retail (non-physical) ===
- Americana Exchange
- True & Co.

=== Retail (specialty) ===
- Betabrand
- Brandless
- Cameron Hughes Wine
- Good Vibrations
- Gump's
- McRoskey Mattress Company
- One Kings Lane
- Pottery Barn
- Timbuk2
- Touch of Modern
- Williams-Sonoma, Inc.
- RH
- Minted
- Roost
- Chairish

=== Software and programming ===
- Ubisoft
- Advent Software
- Anthropic
- AppDynamics
- BitTorrent, Inc.
- Calypso Technology
- Clarizen
- Clustrix
- Discord
- Kx Systems
- JotForm
- Linden Lab
- MathCrunch
- MyTime
- New Relic
- OpenAI
- OpenTable
- Optimizely
- Perplexity AI
- Piggybackr
- Square
- Twist and Shout, Inc.
- VerticalResponse
- WhatsApp
- Zynga

=== Utilities ===
- Pacific Bell
- Pacific Gas & Electric
- Recology

== Companies formerly based in San Francisco ==
- Bank of America – relocated to Charlotte, North Carolina
- Bechtel - relocated to Reston, Virginia
- Block, Inc. - no designated headquarters location since 2022
- California State Automobile Association – relocated to Walnut Creek, California
- Charles Schwab Corporation - relocated to Westlake, Texas in 2019
- Chevron – relocated to San Ramon, California
- Coinbase - no designated headquarters location since 2020
- Core-Mark - relocated to Dallas, Texas in 2019
- Cost Plus World Market - relocated to Oakland
- Crocker Bank – purchased by Wells Fargo Bank
- Del Monte Foods - relocated to Walnut Creek, California
- Esprit – relocated to Ratingen, Germany and Hong Kong
- Excite@Home – purchased by Ask.com
- Flickr – acquired by Yahoo!
- Folgers Coffee – acquired by The J.M. Smucker Co.
- Gymboree - defunct
- Hambrecht & Quist, LLC – purchased by Chase Manhattan Bank, later folded into JP Morgan Securities following Chase's purchase of JPM
- Hearst Corporation – relocated to New York City
- Hills Brothers Coffee – purchased by Massimo Zanetti Beverage USA
- Levison Brothers / California Jewelry Co. San Francisco - defunct
- Link TV - merged with KCET in 2012
- McKesson Corporation - relocated to Irving, Texas in 2019
- Montgomery Securities – purchased by NationsBank Corporation on June 30, 1997
- Pacific Telesis – acquired by SBC Communications, which became AT&T when it purchased AT&T Corporation
- Pacific Gas and Electric Company - moved to Oakland, California in 2022
- Palantir Technologies - relocated to Austin, Texas in 2021
- Patelco Credit Union - relocated to Dublin, California in 2018
- Pegasus Aviation Finance Company – acquired by AWAS
- Popchips - relocated to Playa Vista, California
- Robertson Stephens – closed by its parent company FleetBoston in July 2002
- Rolling Stone – relocated to New York City, New York
- The Sharper Image - relocated to Farmington Hills, Michigan
- Sega of America - relocated to Irvine, California in 2015
- SKYY Spirits - renamed Campari America after acquisition by Campari Group and relocated to New York City in 2018
- Six Apart – moved to Tokyo
- Southern Pacific – acquired by Union Pacific Railroad
- Sunset Magazine - relocated to Oakland, California
- Swensen's Ice Cream – acquired by International Franchise Corp (IFC) of Markham, Ontario, Canada
- Transamerica – purchased by Aegon
- Union Bank of California - relocated to New York City
- United Commercial Bank – acquired by East West Bank
- URS Corporation - acquired by AECOM in 2014
- X Corp. - relocated to Bastrop, Texas in 2024
- Adina World Beat Beverages – defunct, shutdown in 2012

== See also ==
- List of companies based in the San Francisco Bay Area
