= Traction =

Traction may refer to:

== Engineering ==
- Forces:
  - Traction (mechanics), adhesive friction or force
  - Traction vector, in mechanics, the force per unit area on a surface, including normal and shear components
- Traction motor, an electric motor used for propulsion of a vehicle, for example a car or a locomotive
- Railway electric traction, the use of electric motors to propel rail cars
- Traction engine, a self-propelled steam engine

== Other uses ==
- Traction (agency), San Francisco-based interactive advertising agency
- Traction (orthopedics), a set of mechanisms for straightening broken bones or relieving pressure on the skeletal system
- Traction (organization), a non-profit activism organization in North Carolina
- Traction (album), by New Zealand band Supergroove
- Traction TeamPage, a commercial blog/wiki software platform
- Traction (The Batman), 2nd episode of The Batman
- Traction (geology), a process which transports bed load through a channel

== See also ==
- Tracktion
