= Twist and Shout (disambiguation) =

"Twist and Shout" is a song by Phil Medley and Bert Russell, notably covered by the Isley Brothers and the Beatles.

Twist and Shout may also refer to:

== Music ==
- Twist & Shout (album), a 1962 album by The Isley Brothers
- Twist and Shout (EP), a 1963 extended play record by the Beatles
- Twist and Shout (album), a 1964 Canadian album by the Beatles
- "Twist and Shout" (Deacon Blue song), a 1991 song by Scottish rock band Deacon Blue

== Other ==
- Twist and Shout (film), a 1984 Danish drama film directed by Billie August
- Twist and Shout (game show), a 2010 Philippine television show broadcast on ABS-CBN
- Twist and Shout, Inc., an American software company
- Twist n' Shout, a Loudoun Castle roller coaster in Scotland
