= Double Rainbow =

A double rainbow is an optical phenomenon where two rainbows are visible.

Double Rainbow may refer to:

== Media ==
- Double Rainbow (viral video), a viral video filmed by Paul "Bear" Vasquez
- Double Rainbow: The Music of Antonio Carlos Jobim, a 1995 album by jazz saxophonist Joe Henderson
- Double Rainbow, an album by Aya Matsuura
- "Double Rainbow", a song from the 1979 Sarah Vaughan album Copacabana
- "Double Rainbow", a song from the 2013 Katy Perry album Prism

== Other uses ==
- Double Rainbow (ice cream), a brand of premium ice cream, sorbets, and frozen desserts
