= 2006 Santa Cruz Measure K =

Ballot measure in Santa Cruz decreasing penalties for marijuana possession

Measure K is an ordinance put on the city of Santa Cruz's annual ballot on November 6, 2006. Its purpose was to give marijuana violations the lowest priority for local law enforcement. All other offenses besides adult-marijuana offenses were put to a higher priority as well. After winning with 63.88% of the vote, Measure K was put into action in December 2006.

== Origin ==
Measure K was originally sponsored by the group, Santa Cruz Citizens for Sensible Marijuana Policy which was organized and led by Andrea Tischler. It was also funded by Ohio insurance tycoon Peter B. Lewis who donated $70000 for the cause. The year before the law was enacted 254 citations for possession or use of marijuana in amounts less than an ounce were given out.

== Effects of the Measure ==
- Non-medical marijuana offenses committed by adults are given the lowest priority to local law enforcement.
- The Santa Cruz city clerk must send letters every year to federal and state legislators to reform marijuana laws. They state the following:

The citizens of the city of Santa Cruz have passed an initiative to deprioritize marijuana offenses and request that the federal and California state governments take immediate steps to tax and regulate marijuana use, cultivation, and distribution and to authorize state and local communities to do the same.

- Cooperation with state and federal authorities is restricted in relation to marijuana investigations and arrests.
- Prohibits city from accepting federal funds to investigate or prosecute marijuana offenses.
- Creates a community oversight committee to monitor police reports for marijuana arrests.
- Declares that it is city policy to support policies for taxation and regulation of marijuana.
- The City of Santa Cruz cannot receive funds to aid in investigations and prosecutions of marijuana offenses.
- Measure K does not apply to the possession of marijuana by minors, the sale of marijuana to minors, being under the influence of marijuana while driving or cultivating marijuana on public property.

== Goals ==
To help Santa Cruz law enforcement focus their resources on high priority crimes such as murder and theft, and to save taxpayer's dollars on marijuana offense prosecutions.

== Pros ==
- Frees up police resources to handle the rising occurrence of crime in Santa Cruz.
  - The year after it was passed, the number of rapes and murders dropped 26% and 33%, respectively.
- Saves the state an annual $50,000 in grant money from The California Office of Emergency Services under The Marijuana Suppression program which is used to pay for the investigation and prosecution of marijuana cases.

== Cons ==
- It conflicts with California state law.
- It forces officers to go against their oath by violating state law.
- Restricts law enforcers actions against drug dealers.
- Most of its funding came from an out-of-state donor.

== Oversight Committee ==
Measure K set up an oversight committee to oversee the actions implemented by Measure K. It is made up of seven volunteer residents of the city of Santa Cruz. The committee meets at 809 Center Street in the City Council Chambers in Santa Cruz City Hall.

Oversight Committee Meetings Dates(as of Oct 18, 2011):

- June 15, 2009
- January 28, 2010
- June 14, 2010
- December 13, 2010
