= Kimpton Hotels & Restaurants =

American boutique hotel chain

- Trade name: Kimpton Hotels & Restaurants
- Type: Subsidiary
- Industry: Hospitality
- Founded: 1981; 45 years ago
- Headquarters: San Francisco, California, United States
- Number of locations: 75 hotels
- Key people: • Bill Kimpton, Founder • Mike DeFrino, CEO
- Services: Hotels, restaurants, bars
- Revenue: US$1049.88 million (2014)
- Number of employees: 8,135 (2014)
- Parent: InterContinental Hotels Group
- Website: www.kimptonhotels.com

The Kimpton Hotel & Restaurant Group is a San Francisco-based hotel and restaurant brand owned by IHG Hotels & Resorts (IHG) since 2015. It was founded in 1981.

== History ==
Founded in 1981 by Bill Kimpton and led by Chief Executive Officer Mike DeFrino, the group was the largest chain of boutique hotels in the United States in 2011. As of January 2024, it operates 81 hotels worldwide with a number of new properties forthcoming. New hotels have been announced for Indianapolis, Los Angeles, Paris, Barcelona, Charlottesville, Frankfurt, Grenada, Bali, Tokyo, Shanghai, Hong Kong, Rotterdam and Sanya.

While most Kimpton properties are marketed under their own names as boutique hotels, the company launched two sub-brands in 2005, Hotel Palomar and Hotel Monaco. Each property has a restaurant or bar that is marketed as upscale or trendy. In 2020, Fortune magazine ranked Kimpton Hotels & Restaurants at number 10 on their Fortune List of the Top 100 Companies to Work For in 2020 based on an employee survey of satisfaction. The company also manages and operates hotels owned by other entities, under contract.

On December 16, 2014, IHG announced that it would acquire Kimpton for $430 million in cash. IHG retained the Kimpton brand name within the U.S. and is expanding it globally. As a result of the acquisition, seven of Kimpton's nine hotels in San Francisco left the brand in July 2015.

== See also ==
- List of California companies
- List of companies based in San Francisco
