= Jack & Jason's Pancakes & Waffles =

American food company

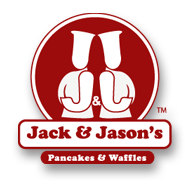
- Company type: Independent
- Industry: Food
- Founded: 2009; 17 years ago
- Headquarters: San Francisco, CA
- Owner: Jack Harper, Jason Jervis
- Parent: Harvis Enterprises Ltd.

Jack & Jason's Pancakes & Waffles is an independently owned and operated artisan foods company based out of San Francisco, California. Producing pancake and waffle mixes made entirely of all-natural, organic ingredients in their Dogpatch facility. The company is a proponent of the American economic recovery movement, working exclusively with domestic farmers and distributors and focusing significantly on job creation for local residents.

== History ==
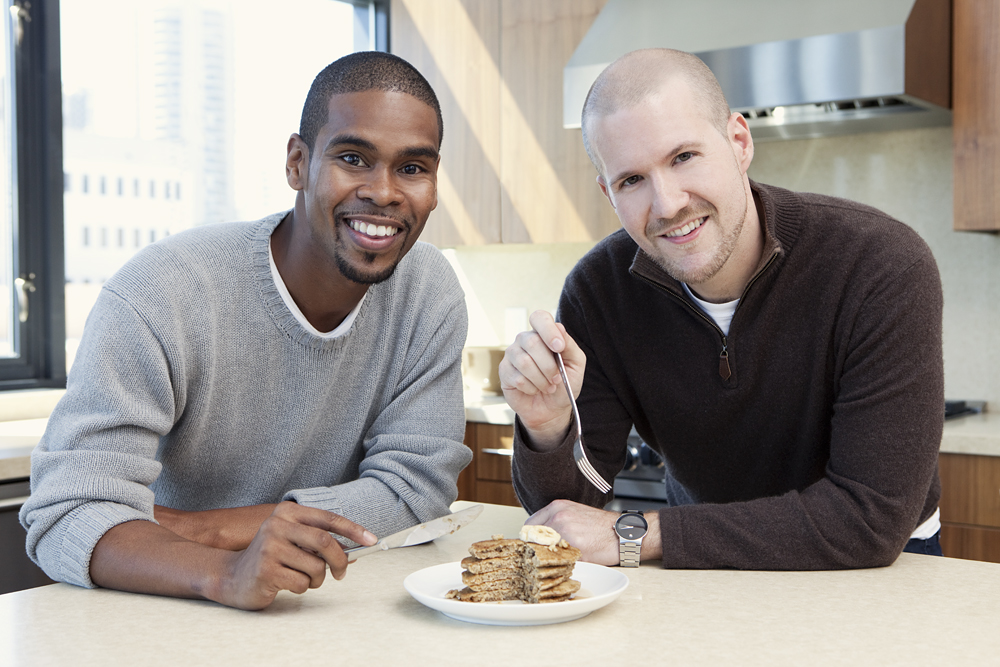
The "Pancake Kings of San Francisco," Jack Harper (right) and Jason Jervis (left), enjoy a stack of pancakes.

Jack & Jason's Pancakes & Waffles started when co-owners Jack Harper and Jason Jervis made the decision to leave their corporate jobs in favor of starting an enterprise of their own. The company has several wholesale distributors across San Francisco and Northern California including Boudin Bakery in Fisherman's Wharf, Mollie Stone's Markets down the Peninsula, New Leaf Community Markets around Santa Cruz, and Nugget Markets in the Sacramento metropolitan area. Jack & Jason's is also branching out to other states; in addition to nationwide online shipping, their products can now be found in Portland, Oregon, Phoenix, Arizona, and Sellersville, Pennsylvania.

== Products ==
The production line at Jack and Jason's currently makes five distinct flavors of pancake mix with a majority of the ingredients supplied by regional Bay Area businesses.

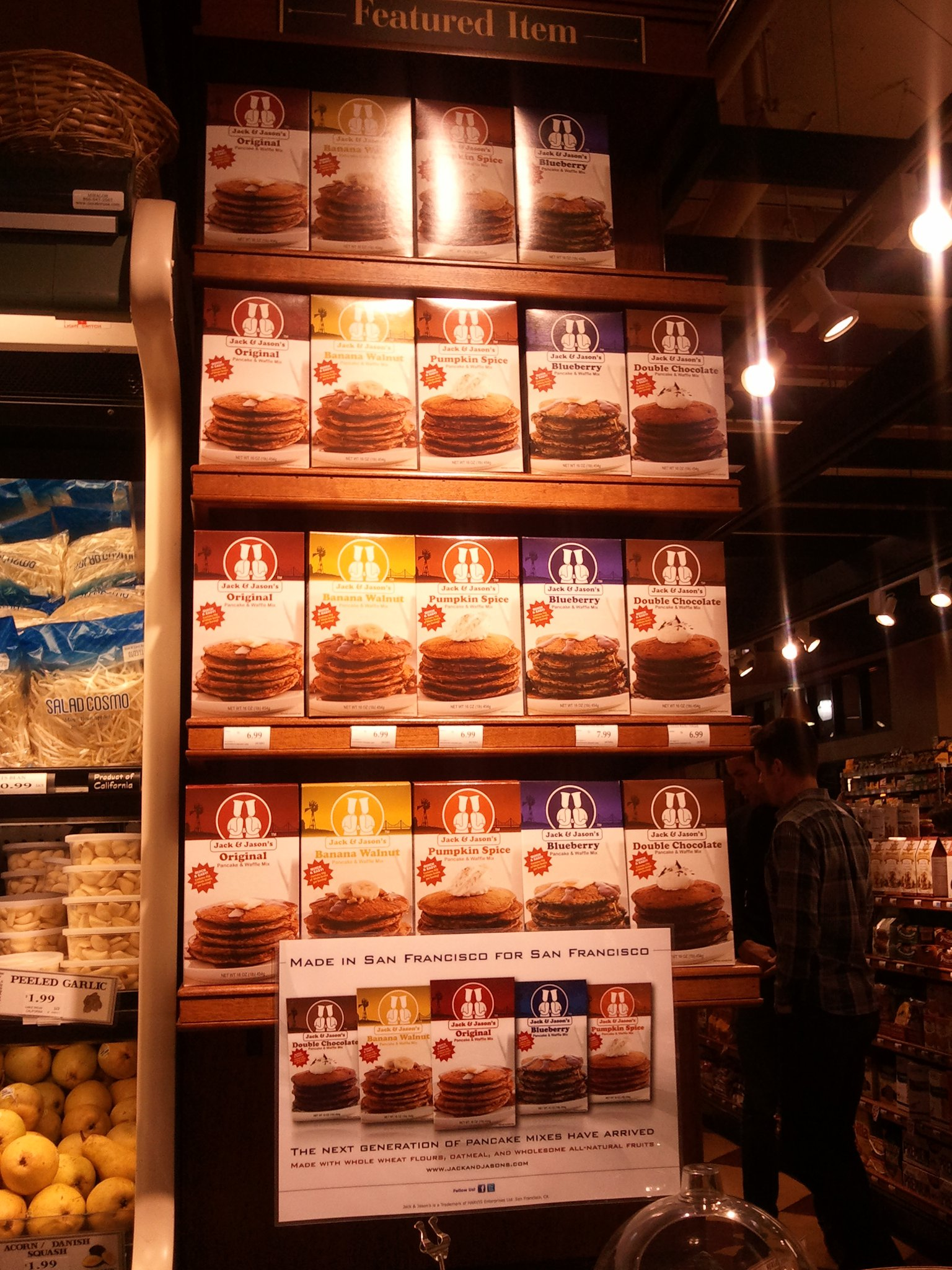
Jack & Jason's featured endcap display at Falletti Foods in NoPa.

- Original – Custom blend of freshly milled whole wheat flour and baby oats from South San Francisco.
- Banana Walnut – Farm-grown bananas and walnuts cultivated in Modesto.
- Blueberry – Organic blueberries grown in California's Central Valley.
- Double Chocolate – Hershey's cocoa and Guittard white chocolate chips from Burlingame.
- Pumpkin Spice – Real pumpkin harvested in Momence, IL and spice from Rancho Cordova.
Flavors

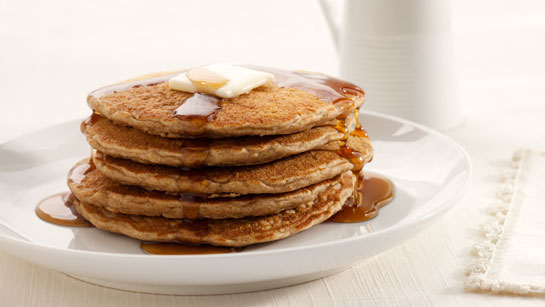
Original

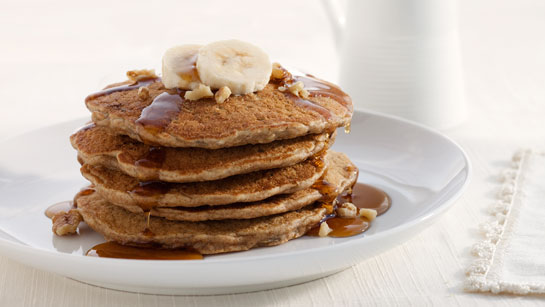
Banana Walnut

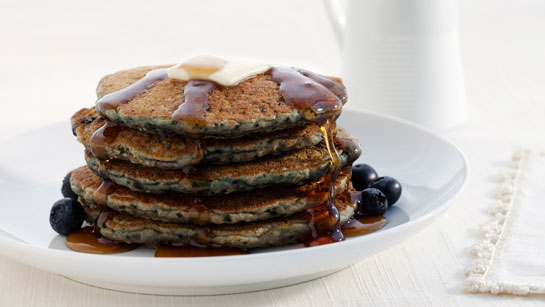
Blueberry

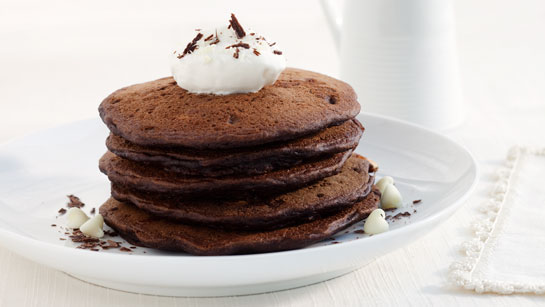
Double Chocolate

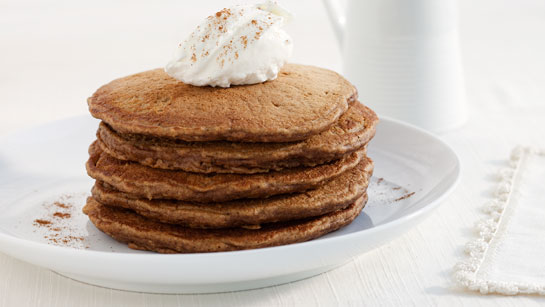
Pumpkin Spice

=== Ingredients ===
Jack & Jason's mixes are produced using organic ingredients provided by local Bay Area companies. The company avoids the use of additives and preservatives (processed baking powder, hydrogenated oils, shortening, etc.) found in more common pancake mixes. As a result, Jack & Jason's mixes are low in fat, high in protein, and provide a full daily serving of dietary fiber from whole grain.

== See also ==
- List of companies headquartered in San Francisco
