= Cameron Hughes Wine =

American wine négociant

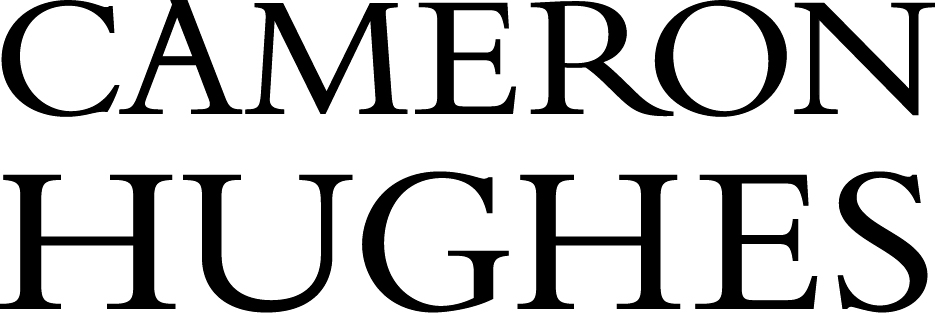
Company logo

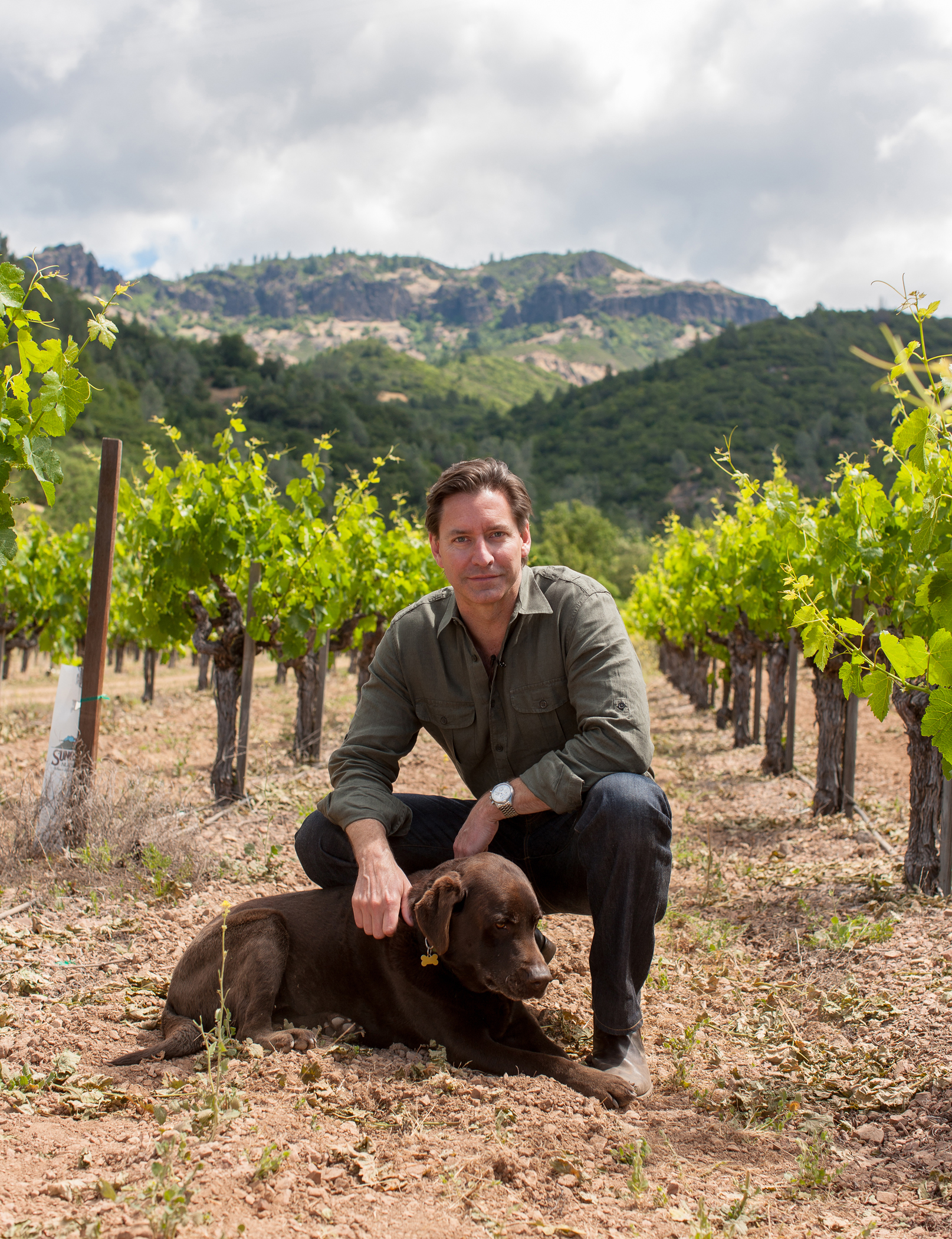
CEO Cameron Hughes at the vineyard

Cameron Hughes Wine, Inc. is a wine négociant that specializes in the acquisition, re-blending, and marketing of fine wines under its own label.

The firm is headquartered in San Francisco, California. Cameron Hughes is the company’s co-founder and former CEO.

== History ==
Cameron Hughes, a native of Modesto California, learned the wine industry from his father, Steve Hughes, a wine salesperson. Cameron Hughes established a wine-brokering firm with his wife and business partner, Jessica Kogan, in 2001. Hughes sold his personal collection of wine to fund the brokerage. He invested in surplus wines, blended them and sold the wine out of the couple’s Volvo.

Cameron Hughes Wine, Inc. sells wines at both retail locations and through wholesalers. The company acquired $3 million mezzanine capital in 2008.

In 2017, Cameron Hughes Wine was acquired by Vintage Wine Estates in a bankruptcy court for $5.5 million.

In July 2024, Vintage Wine Estates filed for Chapter 11 bankruptcy protection, with plans to sell all of its assets, including Cameron Hughes Wine.

== Product ==
Cameron Hughes Wine offers wine under six labels: The Lot Series, Hughes Wellman, CAM Collection, Cameron Hughes California, Greenlip, and Zin Your Face. The wine is sourced from France, Italy, Spain, Argentina, South Africa, and California.
