= Tea Collection =

American children's clothing company

- Company type: Private
- Industry: Retail
- Founded: 2002; 24 years ago in San Francisco, California
- Headquarters: San Francisco, California, United States
- Area served: Worldwide
- Key people: Emily Meyer; Leigh Rawdon
- Products: Children's Clothing
- Revenue: US$40.3m (2014)
- Number of employees: 90 (2014)
- Website: www.teacollection.com

Tea Collection is a San Francisco-based children's clothing company co-founded in 2002 by Emily Meyer and Leigh Rawdon. The clothing line is available through their e-commerce website as well as department stores and clothing boutiques worldwide.

== History ==
Tea Collection was co-founded in 2002 by Emily Meyer and Leigh Rawdon through funding from angel investors. The inspiration came after a trip Meyer took to Brussels, Belgium.

Since 2012, the company has had a 24 percent compound annual growth rate and seen its headcount more than triple. Revenue in 2014 was more than $40 million, nearly a $10 million increase from the year before.

== Awards and Recognitions ==
Co-founder Leigh Rawdon received the Visa Technology Award from the San Francisco Small Business Network in May 2010.

Since 2007, Tea Collection has been in the Inc. (magazine) list of top 100 consumer products and retail companies.
