= Liquid Realty Partners =

- Industry: Private equity secondary market
- Founded: 2001
- Founder: Scott M. Landress and Mark L. Berman
- Defunct: 2012
- Headquarters: San Francisco

Liquid Realty Partners was a private equity real estate firm that invested indirectly in commercial property by acquiring interests in existing real estate funds, partnerships, joint ventures, separate accounts, unit trusts and other private investment vehicles in the private equity secondary market.

During its period of operation from 2001 to 2012, Liquid accepted $1.5 billion in capital commitments and closed 47 investments.

The fund is notable for its £435 million purchase of Jersey property unit trusts in May 2006, the largest secondary real estate acquisition at that time. This record was superseded by the $3 billion transaction between The Blackstone Group and CalPERS in November 2015.

== History ==
The firm was founded in 2001 and was launched in 2002 by Scott M. Landress and Mark L. Berman.

In May 2006, the company acquired a portfolio of Jersey property unit trusts for £435 million (US$775 million), believed to be the largest secondary real estate acquisition ever completed at that time.

In December 2007, the company raised $572.3 million for its 4th fund.

In July 2008, the company invested £30 million in a fund focused on office properties in the West End of London.

In April 2012, the company laid off its investment staff after failing to raise new funds.

In July 2012, the company sued a company run by its former executives for allegedly stealing trade secrets.
