= Peter B. Lewis =

American businessman (1933–2013)

- Born: Peter Benjamin Lewis; November 11, 1933; Cleveland, Ohio, U.S.
- Died: November 23, 2013 (aged 80); Coconut Grove, Florida, U.S.
- Education: Princeton University (A.B.)
- Occupation: Businessman
- Known for: CEO of Progressive Insurance Company
- Spouse(s): Toby Devan (1955-1981; divorced); Janet Rosel (2013)
- Children: with Devan: --Ivy Lewis --Jonathan Lewis --Adam Joseph Lewis
- Parent(s): Joseph Lewis; Helen Lewis

Peter Benjamin Lewis (November 11, 1933 – November 23, 2013) was an American businessman who was the chairman of Progressive Insurance Company.

== Early life and education ==
Lewis was raised in a Jewish family in Cleveland Heights, Ohio, the oldest of four children born to Helen and Joseph Lewis. His father — who had co-founded a small auto insurance company named Progressive Insurance with Jack Green in 1937 — was grooming Lewis to work at the company when he died at age 48 while Lewis was a junior at Cleveland Heights High School. He graduated with an A.B. in politics from Princeton University in 1955 after completing a senior thesis titled "The Financially Irresponsible Motorist -a Problem in Practical Politics."

== Career ==
After college, Lewis joined Progressive Insurance as an underwriting trainee. In 1965, he and his mother borrowed $2.5 million, pledging their majority stake as collateral, and completed a leveraged buyout of Progressive. Lewis became chief executive officer of a company which had 40 employees at that time. He subsequently grew the business and, by the 1960s, Progressive had over 100 employees and $6 million in annual revenue. Lewis focused on insuring high-risk drivers — where premiums were greater — using an innovative pricing system and consumer-friendly service offering competitor quote matching and instant claims service. He also brought in a slew of young, enthusiastic workers and devolved decision-making downward, fostering a relaxed yet disciplined and creative corporate culture.

As of 2010, Progressive had grown to 27,250 employees, with sales of $15.0 billion and had become the third-largest auto insurance company in the United States. In 2000, Lewis retired as CEO of Progressive, though he remained as chairman of the board.

== Philanthropy and political contributions ==
Lewis frequently donated money to charities and liberal political groups. He was a patron of the arts, even going so far as to display Andy Warhol's 10-part series of China's Chairman Mao Zedong in 1974 at Progressive's office in Mayfield Village. Lewis's personal and corporate contemporary art collection is well known — the corporate collection is displayed at Progressive Insurance offices.

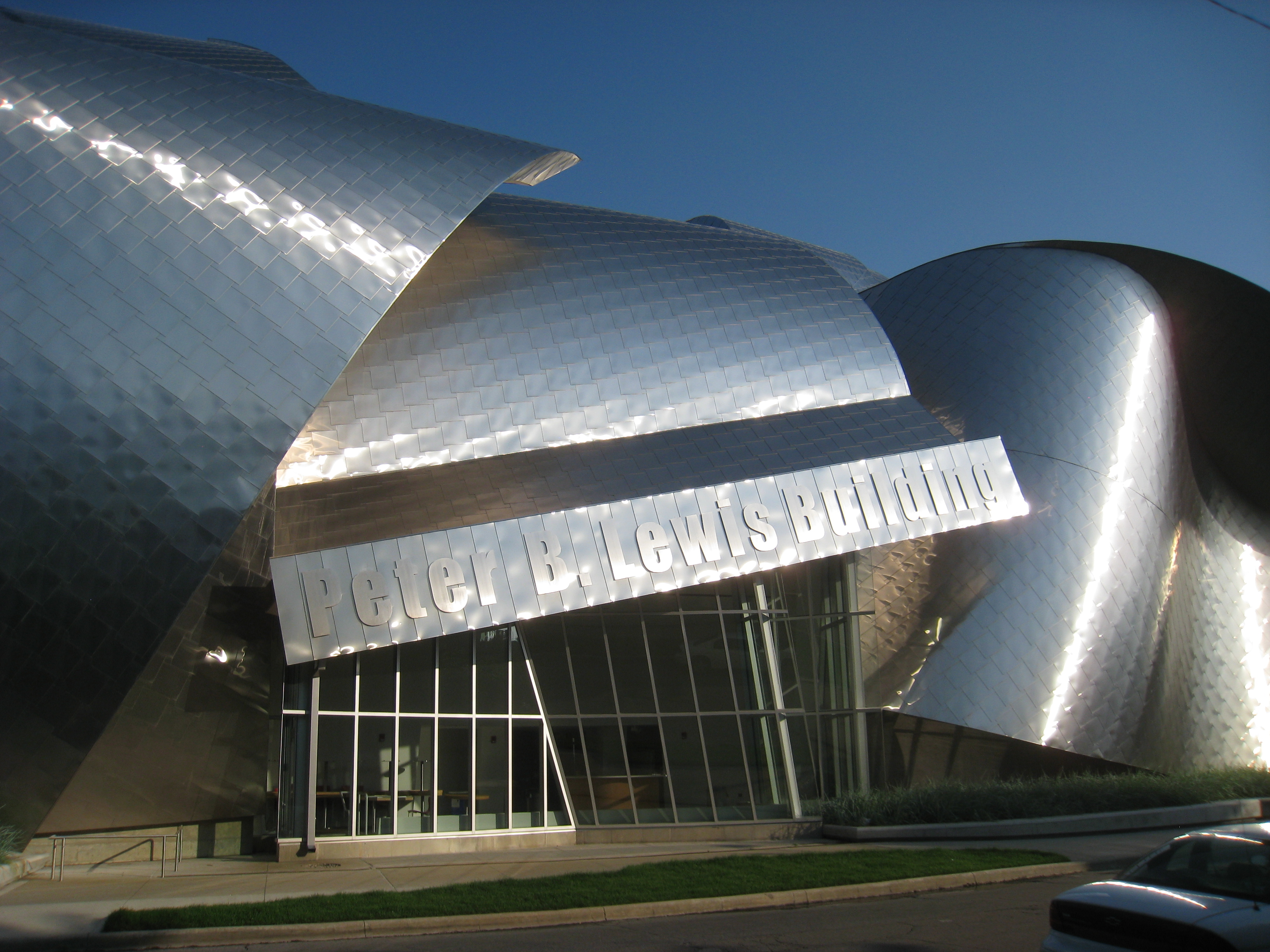
Frank Gehry's Weatherhead School of Management Peter B. Lewis Building at Case Western Reserve University

In September 2012 Lewis signed the Giving Pledge promising to give at least half his wealth to charity. Lewis made donations to:

- Princeton University (A Frank Gehry designed science library, $60 million; the Lewis-Sigler Institute for Integrative Genomics, $55 million; Lewis Center for the Arts, $101 million. Total $233 million to date.)
- Case Western Reserve University (The Weatherhead School of Management Peter B. Lewis Building, another Frank Gehry design, $36.9 million, out of $61.7 total building cost)
- Marijuana Policy Project (Donated $3,000,000 to MPP in 2007.)
- The Guggenheim Museum ($50 million)
- America Coming Together and MoveOn.org (with George Soros matching his $10 and $2.5 million, respectively)
- American Civil Liberties Union $15 million
- The Democratic Party
- Multidisciplinary Association for Psychedelic Studies-sponsored MDMA/PTSD Research in the US, Switzerland and Israel $750,000 [www.maps.org]
- Menorah Park (Peter B. Lewis Aquatic & Therapy Center)
- Traction
- Support of California's Proposition 19 also known as the Regulate, Control & Tax Cannabis Act (Donation of $159,005 on 10/15/2010)
- Support for Washington Initiative 502 with contributions totaling $2,038,700
- Oberlin College (The Peter B. Lewis Gateway Center, a hotel and conference center that will be the cornerstone of Oberlin's Green Arts District; $5 million gift out of a total cost of $32 million.)

Lewis was a trustee of Princeton University, former chairman of the board of directors at the Guggenheim Museum (resigned January 19, 2005), and served on the board of the Cleveland Museum of Art. Although Lewis often gave substantial gifts to artistic and educational organizations, he also had a reputation for — often forcefully — insisting that such organizations be financially accountable and financially sound; in 2002, Lewis said he would no longer give to Case or Cleveland's University Circle neighborhood or to any Cleveland Charities due to poor civic and organizational leadership and management. While he did restrict Cleveland giving, he did not follow through completely on that threat.

Lewis was an advocate of taxing and regulating the use and sale of marijuana and was one of the main financial backers of the campaign to legalize the use of marijuana for medical use in the United States. In January 2000, Lewis was arrested and charged in New Zealand for possession of marijuana. Lewis pleaded guilty to three charges and paid a substantial fine, though under New Zealand law he was not required to serve time in jail or prison. According to his lawyer, Marie Dyhrberg, Lewis used the marijuana on the advice of his doctor for pain relief after the partial amputation of his leg in 1998.

== Personal life ==
In 1955, Lewis married Toby Devan. They amicably divorced in 1981. They had three children. He had homes in Miami, Cleveland, New York City, and Aspen, Colorado; he also traveled around the world on his motor yacht, Lone Ranger. Since 1985, his ex-wife Toby, who had worked at the Cleveland Center for Contemporary Art, took over the expansive Progressive art collection.

In September 2013, he married his long-time companion, Janet Rosel.

Lewis died of a heart attack at his home in Coconut Grove, Florida, on November 23, 2013, twelve days after his 80th birthday. He was interred at Mayfield Cemetery in Cleveland Heights, Ohio. His net worth at the time of his death was $1.25 billion.
