= AfterCollege =

AfterCollege, Inc.
- Type: Job search engine
- Industry: Internet; Education; Career networking
- Founded: 1999
- Headquarters: San Francisco, CA
- Key people: Roberto Angulo (CEO)
- Divisions: Recruitology
- Website: www.aftercollege.com

AfterCollege is an online service that connects job-seeking college students and alumni with employers who want to hire them through faculty and career networks at colleges and universities in the U.S. The service uses a patented matching process to deliver jobs to jobseekers, basing matches in part on a user's academic affiliation and field of study. Recruitology is a division of AfterCollege created in 2016, serving media companies and employers.

== History ==
AfterCollege was one of the first entry-level job boards on the Internet, created in 1996 by students at Stanford University and originally called "The Job Resource". The service allowed students at Stanford to upload their resumes for employers to browse. The website grew in popularity and soon after spread to other campuses. In 1999, the service was incorporated and renamed AfterCollege. In 2009, AfterCollege received a Webby Honoree Award for best design in the employment category. In early 2010, AfterCollege was named one of the top niche career sites by members of the public in an online competition run by the United States Department of Labor.

In March 2012 AfterCollege participated in President Obama’s launch of Summer Jobs+, an initiative to provide employment opportunities for low-income and disconnected youth.

In August 2012, AfterCollege relaunched as a professional network for college students and recent graduates, offering profile tools and revamped job matching.

In April 2015, AfterCollege acquired Collegefeed, a service that also focused on helping college students find jobs.

== Published works ==
In December 2017, AfterCollege co-founder Roberto Angulo published a book, Getting Your First Job For Dummies, with John Wiley & Sons, Inc.

== See also ==
- Employment website
