= Boombotix =

American company specializing in audio equipment

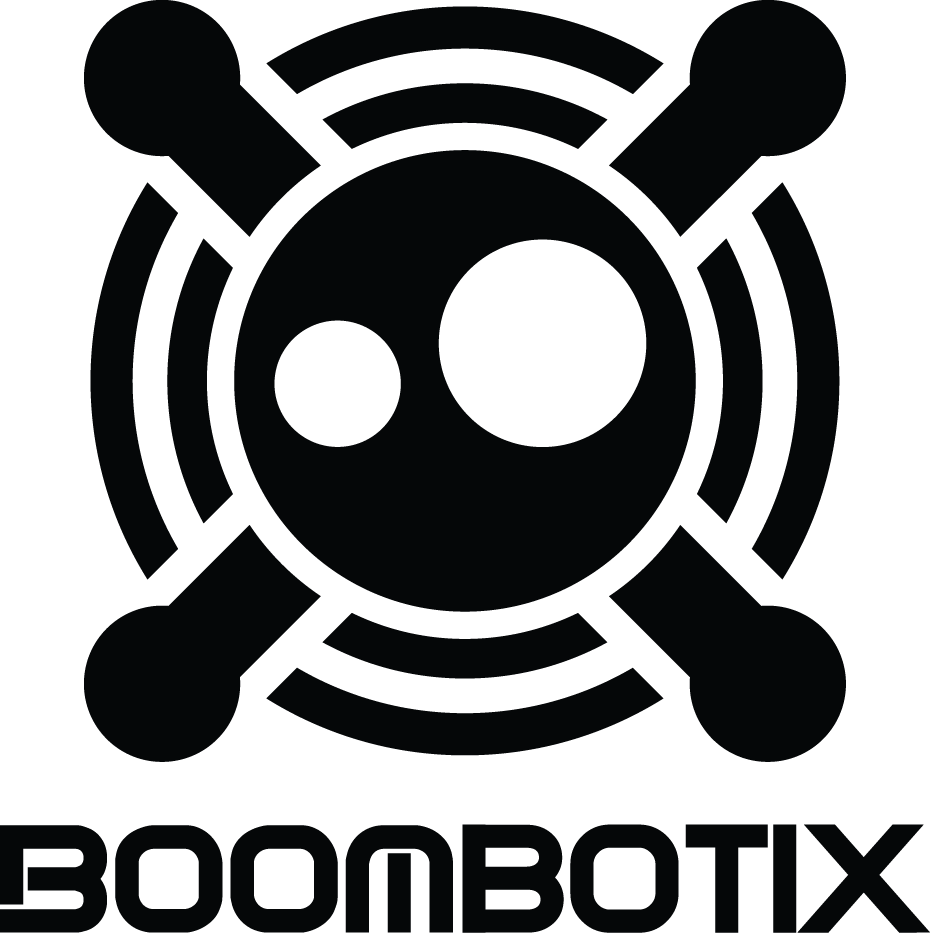
- Industry: Audio equipment
- Founded: 2009
- Founder: Lief Storer
- Headquarters: San Francisco, California, United States
- Products: Portable speakers Mobile audio accessories
- Website: www.boombotix.com

Boombotix is a San Francisco, California based company that makes and markets portable speakers and mobile audio accessories. The name "Boombotix" is a fictitious term derived from the science of sound. The term merges robotics and boombox. The products consist of audio focused wearable technology with a line of devices called Boombots.

Boombotix's products are targeted to urban and outdoor sports demographics (namely cyclists, skateboarders, skiers, and surfers) and the general consumer electronics market. The products are commonly used by bike messengers and commuters as a hands-free communications device.

Boombotix products are sold through major retailers including Verizon, Radio Shack, Urban Outfitters, Zumiez, specialty retailers, bike shops and their online store.

== Company history ==
Lief Storer founded Boombotix (originally under the name SkullyBoom), in 2009. The first Boombotix product, named the SB1, was inspired by the Skully vinyl toy, manufactured at the time by Urban Warfair. By splitting the vinyl down the middle, and adding a dissected iHome audio speaker and Motorola radio clip, Lief was able to create a wearable speaker. The original prototype product went viral in the online community, with TechCrunch touting it as an "uncrushable music device". The SB1 combined a powerful driver in an ultra portable, drop tested and water resistant package. In 2010, the first product was sold at Ken's Bike and Ski in Davis, CA.

In 2013 the company launched the Boombot REX designed by Chris McKleroy. This new device became amongst the first voice controlled speakers. It incorporated dual drivers and a passive bass radiator making it one of the loudest portable speakers for its size. The company raised four times of their target goal with their Kickstarter crowdfunding campaign.

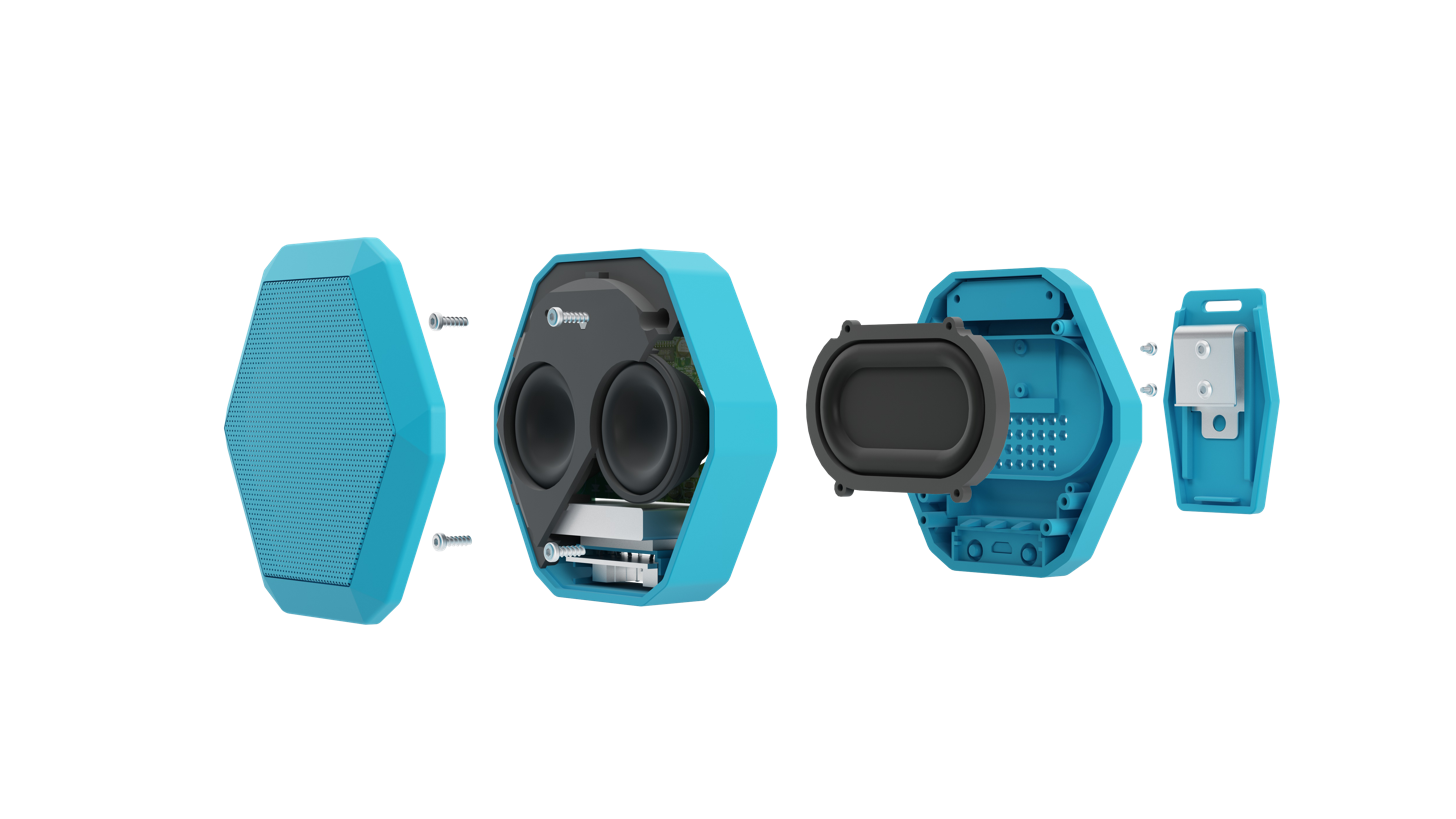
BoombotREX Exploded Blue

In early 2015, RZA joined the Boombotix as the company's "Head Abbot." RZA's role would be focused on connecting Boombotix to more musicians and help marketing the product.

In summer of 2015 Boombotix launched two new speaker products: the Boombot PRO and the Boombot MINI. The Boombot PRO is the company's first waterproof speaker.

In Q4 of 2016, the company was supposed to undergo a change in management, yet none of the effect have been observed. Warrantied speakers, all orders from the end of 2016, and any sort of technical support are all nonexistent. Company may have filed for bankruptcy.

The company has been unable to respond to consumer issues and complaints, garnering an F with the BBB and many negative reviews on yelp at their defunct San Francisco location.

== Product Reception ==
By the end of 2013, Boombotix had already sold over sixty thousand Boombot units. Boombotix products received a fair amount of press and reviews for their portable speaker product, from the action sports and consumer electronics sectors alike. Boombotix has targeted the cycling community with a handlebar mount kit to clip the speaker on, which has garnered Boombotix a strong following in the urban cycling community.

== Headquarters ==
Boombotix is headquartered in San Francisco, but mostly operates out of Delaware. Its out of business.

== Investors ==
In 2014, the company received a $4 million investment from key players including David Dolby, Walden Venture Capital, Social+Capital Partnership, Baseline, Red Hills and Grishin Robotics.

=== Sponsored Athletes ===
Boombotix is known for being rooted in action sports, sponsoring professional athletes in cycling, skateboarding, skiing, and surfing. Working with athletes such as cyclists Jason Clary, Kevin "Squid" Bolger, and Matt "Slumworm" Reyes, skier Mike Hornbeck and skateboarders Jevelle Wiltz, Danny Ramirez, and '97 X-Games Street Skate gold medalist Mako Urabe, Boombotix has been able to continuously develop their product with input from a professional team.

=== Promotions with Artists ===
In 2014 Boombotix partnered with RZA to release a co-branded Wu-Tang Clan unit. The unit is unique in that it contains 8 tracks from the 20th Anniversary Wu-Tang Album, "A Better Tomorrow." The unit was released three weeks prior to the general release of the album. Additionally, the track "Big Horn B," was only ever released through the 3,000 limited edition units.

They have also collaborated with The Grateful Dead, Del from Hieroglyphics and Achozen.
