= ON24 =

Cloud-based platform

ON24, Inc.
- Type: Public
- Traded as: NYSE: ONTF
- Industry: Internet; Media; Technology
- Predecessor: NewsDirect Inc.
- Founded: 1998; 28 years ago
- Founder: Csaba Fikker; Bill Bales; Nina Chen
- Headquarters: San Francisco, California, U.S
- Area served: Worldwide
- Key people: Sharat Sharan (CEO); Steve Vattuone (CFO); Jim Blackie (CRO); David Lee (CMO)
- Services: webcasting; virtual event
- Number of employees: 250-500
- Website: www.on24.com

ON24 is a cloud-based platform that develops and sells web-based webinar, virtual conferencing, content hub, and landing page applications as a service for marketing and sales teams in B2B organizations. In 2023, it expanded its offerings to include generative AI services.

Headquartered in San Francisco, ON24 has offices globally in North America, EMEA, and APAC. It has operations in the United States, and affiliates in the United Kingdom, Australia, Singapore and Japan.

== History ==
ON24 was founded in 1998 by Csaba Fikker, Bill Bales and Nina Chen as NewsDirect Inc., to become a distribution center for Internet-based video press releases. After an initial investment the co-founders and board of Directors hired Sharat Sharan as a CEO.

In 1999, with Sharat Sharan as CEO the company rebranded to be known as ON24 and focused on being an online financial news streaming media source. Following the dot com-bust in 2001, the company started concentrating solely on its webcasting platform. In August 2002, ON24 discontinued its news operation.

In 2006, ON24 began its global expansion with presence in the US, the UK, Australia, Singapore and Spain. In 2008, the company launched its virtual event platform, ON24 Virtual Show, expanding the company's focus to include trade shows, conferences, and events.

The company completed an initial public offering in February 2021 of 9,845,069 shares of common stock at $50.00 per share, generating gross proceeds of approximately $492.3 million. Between June 2023 and January 2024, ON24 launched its AI-powered service, Analytics and Content Engine (ACE)

On April 1, 2026, Cvent completed the acquisition of ON24.

== Technology ==
ON24 leverages HTTP-based live streaming (HLS) technology to stream live webinars and virtual events via 2500k and 300k video bit rates. ON24 integrates with a range of Marketing Automation Platforms (MAPs) such as Hubspot, Zapier, and Workato and Customer Relationship Management solutions (CRM).

== Awards and Recognitions ==
- 2009, 2010, 2012, 2014 Global Frost & Sullivan Award for Market Leadership
- 2017 to 2025 G2 “Users Love Us”
- 2017 to 2025 G2 “Grid Leader” for Enterprise Webinars
- 2019 to 2025 TrustRadius “Top Rated”
- 2020 to 2021TrustRadius “Tech Cares”
- 2020 TrustRadius “Buyer’s Choice: Best Customer Support”
- 2021 MarTech Breakthrough Awards
- 2022 TrustRadius “Best Software”
- 2022 to 2023 TrustRadius “Buyer’s Choice: Best Feature Set”
- 2022 to 2023 TrustRadius “Buyer’s Choice: Best Relationship”
- 2023 TrustRadius “Best Value for Price”
- 2024 TrustRadius “Most Loved”
- 2024 TrustRadius “Buyer’s Choice”
