= Levison Brothers / California Jewelry Co. San Francisco =

Herman Levison circa 1870s Germany

Levison Brothers / California Jewelry Co. was active from 1859 to 1935. Founded in 1859, they occupied 629 Washington Street, San Francisco, California by 1863, and by 1871 moved into two floors of their own building at 134 Sutter Street, San Francisco, furnished with machinery, tools, and appliances powered by a 25-horsepower engine.

Their advertising for the year 1871 states that they were the sole agent for American Watch Co., Elgin National Watch Company, Howard Watch Co., Chas. E. Jacot Watches, Carter Sloan & Co. Fine Jewelry, Meriden Britannia Co., and Rogers Brothers silver-plated ware, New Haven Clock Co., and Laders Frary & Clark's cutlery. The firm also imported watches, diamonds, jewelry, solid silverware, cutlery, clocks, and opera glasses, and manufactured fine jewelry. Major lapidary work such as diamond cutting was done on site per promotional pamphlets that survive today. Several initialed gold and silver signed watch cases are known as of the date of writing. These cases are either signed "Levison Bros." or initialed "LB" or similar.

One of their specialties was production of locally sourced fine quality gold quartz, moss agate, and gold jewelry and utility items popular in the 19th century, including chains, sleeve buttons, breast pins, lockets, rings, thimbles, and solid gold belt buckles with inlay. The woman's belt buckle by Levison Brothers at the New York Metropolitan Museum (click on the reference 6 URL for image) contains a description that indicates that California Jewelry Company's employee Mr. William Cummings was the August 1868 patentee of a special belt buckle prong and ring design utilized in the specimen owned by the museum. Few of these pieces survive today, and most appear to be unsigned and otherwise difficult to verify as having been made by Levison Brothers / California Jewelry Co.

Fractional gold coinage was produced as legal tender for a single year in 1871, sporting an "L" stamp for Levison Brothers, making use of locally available California gold. The company bought out R.B. Gray Co. of San Francisco, and was then able to continue making fractional gold using those facilities until authorities attempted to discontinue its production. An ex-Levison Brothers employee continued to use the dies for coin production for several more years. Fractional gold coinage of this period appears to have been produced mainly as souvenirs

Herman Levison was a man of great wealth upon his death in San Francisco in 1896. Per this newspaper article, he was apparently very well known in mercantile circles in both the United States and Europe, and was very liberal in extending credit to smaller dealers, and he had great success in his business. For many years he maintained a home in Hamburg, Germany, and in San Francisco, California, where he hosted lavish parties. His wife and three children resided in Germany, and his son Louis Oscar Levison thus grew up in Europe. Louis Oscar eventually ended up partner in the firm once his father died.

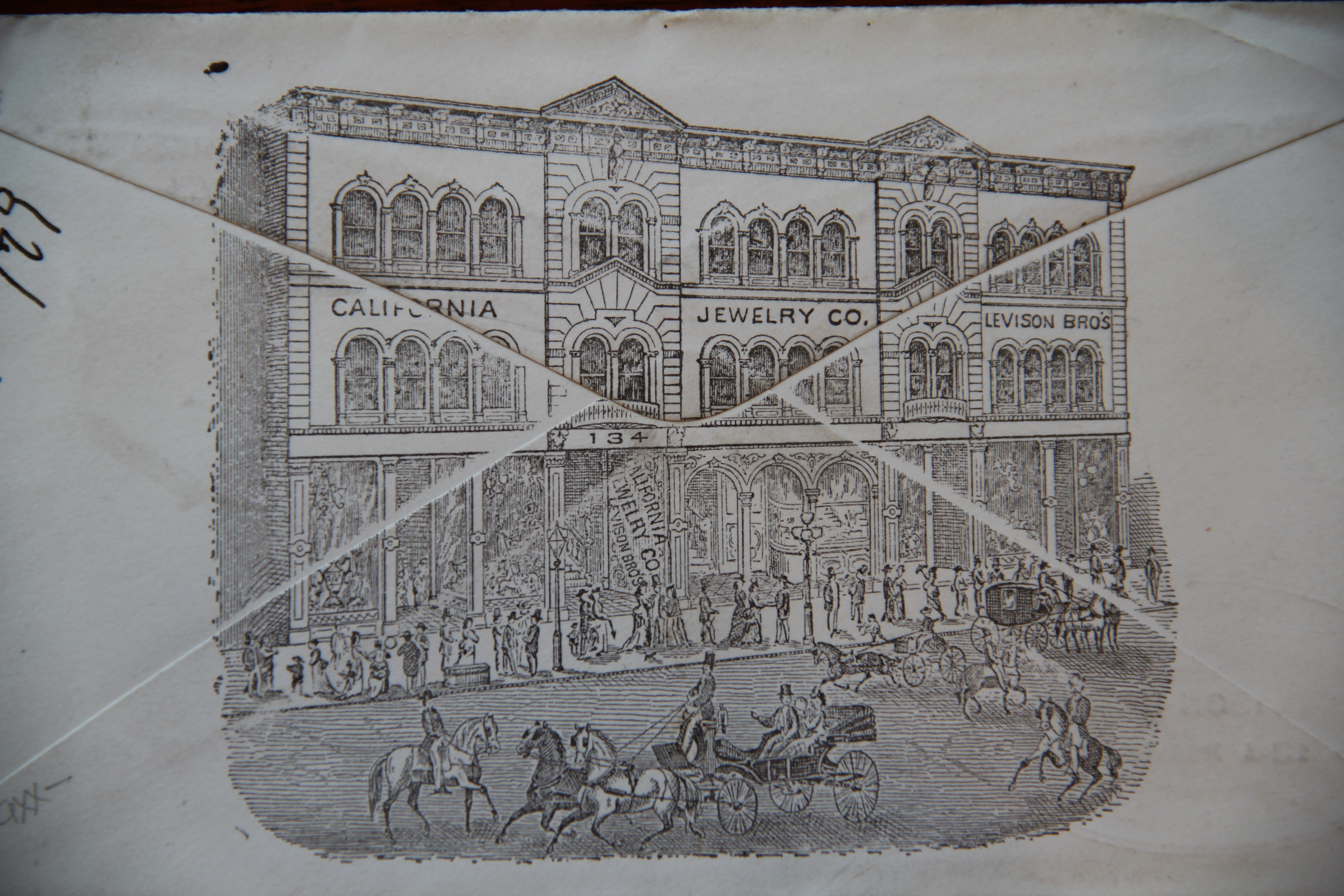
The Levison Brothers / California Jewelry Co. San Francisco Headquarters at 134 Sutter St., San Francisco as it appeared in the 1870s

The building that housed Levison Brothers / California Jewelry Co. San Francisco was for many years located at 132, 134, and 136 Sutter Street, San Francisco California, and was designed and built by the firm partners. Per an article in the Daily Alta California, the building was a 3-story plus basement structure built at a cost of $130,000 (1871 U.S. dollars), and included full lapidary machinery for gem cutting, with Mr. Cullen the in-house head of jewelry design. Importations that year were $500,000 per annum, and manufactures $300,000 per annum. First floor tenants of the Sutter Street building included W.K. Vanderslice & Co. silversmiths who were well-known San Francisco producers of fine quality sterling silver flatware and hollow ware out of this facility starting approximately 1873.

There is one surviving historical photograph of this building as viewed from Sutter Street, archived on the internet, albeit with the "Levison Brothers" street signage blotted out from the image.

Levison family members who were employees of Levison Bros. or California Jewelry Co. included the following: Louis Levison 1827-1901 (One of the two brothers who immigrated from Germany and ran the company as a partner) Herman Levison 1831-1896 (One of the two brothers, and head of the business. Immigrated from Germany and ran the company as a partner)

Louis Oscar Levison 1870-1953 (Son of Herman Levison. Became firm partner after his father died in 1896. Worked for the firm through incorporation in 1907, and until dissolution of the company in 1935. See image at right)

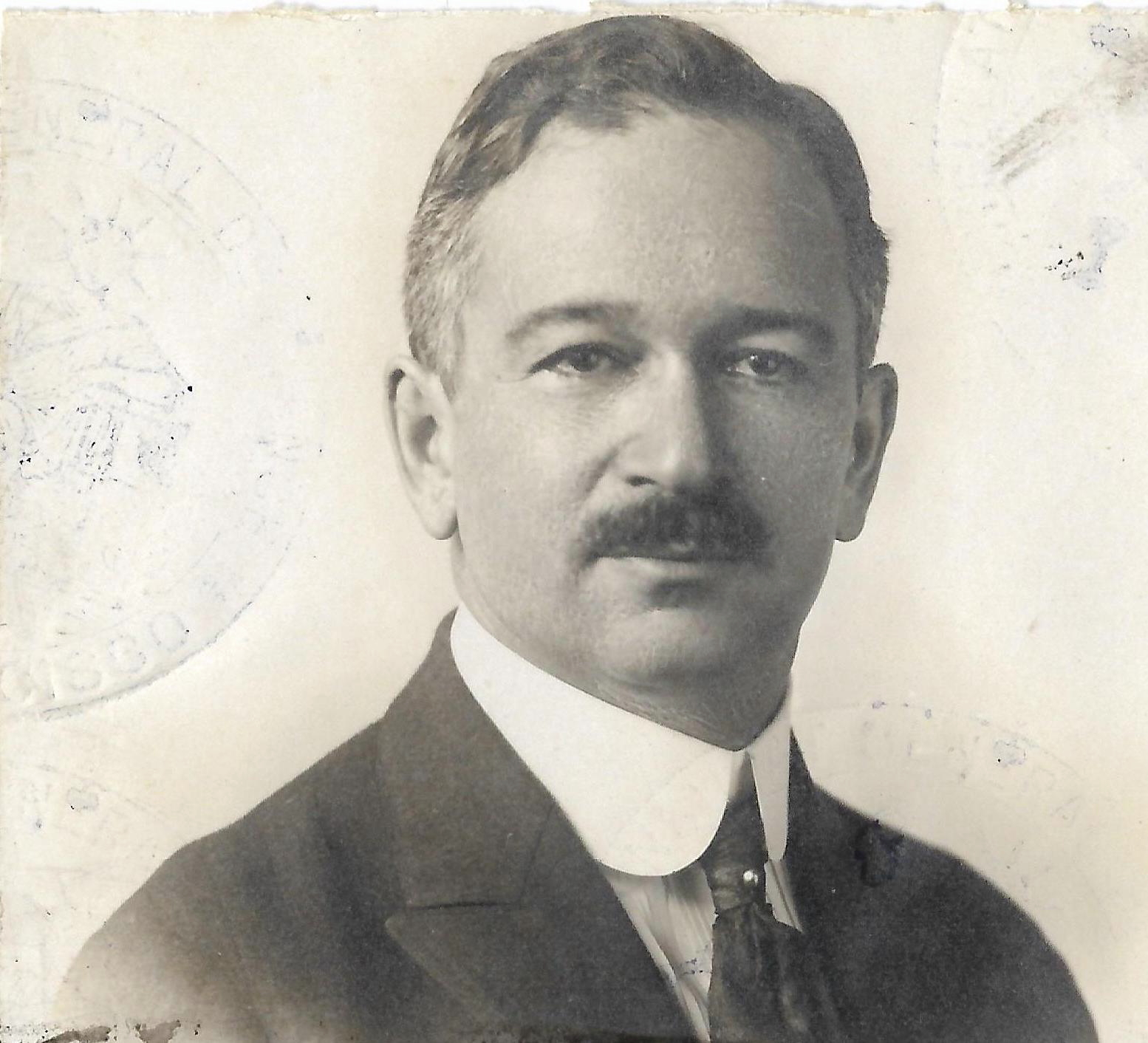
Louis Oscar Levison. Circa 1897 (Age 27). San Francisco Immigration Photo

Walter Herman Levison 1904-1997 (Son of Louis Oscar Levison. Company secretary from 1927-1929. Worked for the company until its dissolution in 1935)

Note that persons with the last name "Levison" who sold retail goods under the name "Levison Brothers" or "Levison Bros." during the gold rush and/or silver rush era in the Sacramento, California area were not related to the Levisons who ran the California Jewelry Co. operations out of San Francisco. The similarities between the names of those persons and operations are purely coincidental.

== Effects of the 1906 San Francisco earthquake and fire on Levison Brothers operations ==
The business was prospering when in 1906 the San Francisco earthquake and fire made a total loss of the original Levison-built and owned building at 132, 134, and 136 Sutter Street (see artist's rendition at right). The only remains were the diamonds and jewelry stored in a very large safe, which fell three floors through the burning building and buried itself in the basement floor, wedged between some steel girders it had pulled down with it. It was badly burned in the fire, and was allowed to cool off for two weeks before anyone could touch it. After an intense digging effort, a pit was opened up around the safe so that the safe door could be opened. The excitement was high. The inner doors of the safe had held tight, and they found the main contents unharmed. The Levisons quickly stashed away the contents for temporary hiding, transporting the contents across San Francisco Bay via boat (this is the pre-bridge era) to a family residence on Beach Road, Belvedere Island, California and another location in Mill Valley, California. That 19th century Victorian residence on Belvedere Island still exists to this day as a historic property.

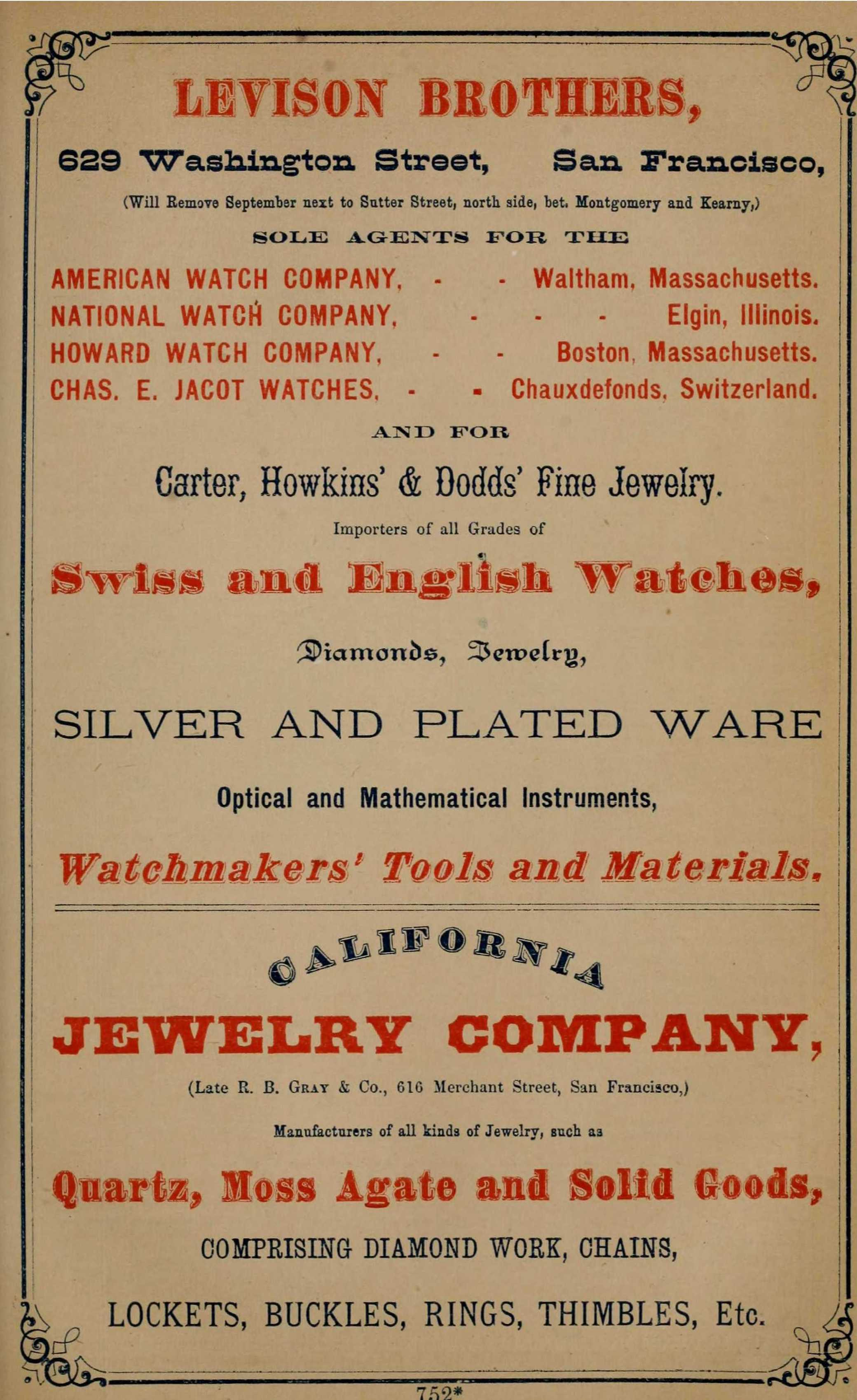
Levison Brothers Advertisement, San Francisco Directory, Year 1871

== See also ==
- California gold coinage
- Fractional currency (United States)
- History of San Francisco
