= Traction (organization) =

Traction is a progressive non-profit organization promoting civic engagement, based in the city of Durham, North Carolina. Traction's goal is to inform, inspire and connect a growing social network of left-leaning 20- and 30-somethings. The organization focuses on raising awareness of progressive issues including civil rights, health care, the environment, electoral fairness, economic justice and education. These topics are integrated into activities such as movies, dodgeball, art exhibitions, sushi-making workshops, potluck dinners and parties to create issue-based events which inform and mobilize the community for social action.

Traction was founded in 2005 by Lanya Shapiro and became a project of the San Francisco-based Tides Center in early 2007. The group's funding sources include the Z. Smith Reynolds Foundation, Jonathan and Peter Lewis, and the Open Society Institute.
