= MyTime =

American software company

- Type: Private
- Industry: Software as a service
- Founded: 2012; 14 years ago
- Founder: Ethan Anderson
- Headquarters: Los Angeles, California, United States
- Products: Appointment scheduling software, point-of-sale software, customer engagement software
- Website: get.mytime.com

MyTime is an American software as a service company headquartered in Los Angeles, California. The company develops scheduling, point-of-sale, and customer engagement software for multi-location service businesses and franchise operators.

== History ==
MyTime was founded in 2012 by Ethan Anderson. Anderson had previously co-founded Redbeacon, an online home services marketplace that won the grand prize at the TechCrunch50 conference in 2009 and was acquired by The Home Depot in January 2012.

MyTime launched as a consumer-facing appointment booking platform in early 2013, initially offering bookings across more than 50 service categories in Los Angeles. In February 2013, the company announced a $3 million seed funding round.

In April 2015, the company raised a $9.25 million Series B round led by Upfront Ventures and Khosla Ventures, bringing total disclosed funding to $12.25 million. The round also included Daher Capital, Accelerator Ventures, and mall operator Westfield.

In October 2016, the company launched a feature allowing consumers to book appointments through a business's Facebook page.

MyTime launched in 2013 as an online marketplace through which consumers could find, book, and pay for local services. In 2015, the company expanded into business-management software, adding scheduling, customer-relationship management, email marketing, and customer-messaging functions. The company is a supplier member of the International Franchise Association.

== Platform ==
MyTime is a cloud-based platform that combines appointment scheduling, point-of-sale, customer engagement, and franchise management tools in a single system. The platform is designed primarily for multi-location service businesses, including those operating as franchise networks.

Core features include a scheduling system that supports web and mobile booking, staff calendar management, waitlists, and integration with Google Search, Google Maps, Facebook, and Instagram. The point-of-sale module supports in-store and online payments, inventory management, automated royalty calculation for franchisors, and cross-location redemption of memberships, packages, and gift cards.

For franchise operators, MyTime provides tools for multi-location management including location templates, centralized brand controls, configurable permissions, royalty reporting, and the ability to launch new franchise locations from a standardized configuration. The platform supports white-label branded guest apps, APIs, webhooks, and SAML-based single sign-on for enterprise integrations.

Marketing and customer engagement tools include automated email, SMS, and push notification campaigns, referral programs, and reputation management features that sync business data across review platforms.

== Awards and recognition ==
- 2014 – Local Search Association Ad to Action Award
- 2014 – 1st Place, LAUNCH Mobile Conference
- 2010 – Founder Ethan Anderson included on Business Insider's Silicon Valley 100 list
