= Sparkpr =

Marketing communications agency

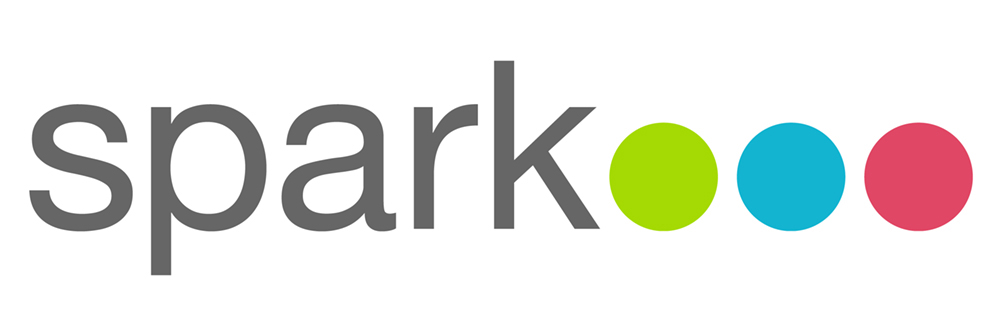
- Type: Private
- Industry: Public Relations and Marketing Communications
- Founded: 1999
- Founder: Donna (Sokolsky) Burke and Chris Hempel
- Headquarters: San Francisco, CA, USA
- Number of employees: 70+
- Website: sparkpr.com

Spark Public Relations (also referred to as Spark) is a public relations and marketing communications agency headquartered in San Francisco, California, with offices in New York City.

== History ==
Spark Public Relations was founded in 1999 by Donna Sokolsky Burke and Chris Hempel, who started the firm after working at Netscape. Its early clients were Silicon Valley start-ups and former Netscape colleagues. The firm signed one-year contracts to help with startup launches and IPOs, in exchange for equity in the company. It supported VA Linux's IPO in December 1999.

In 2006, Alan Soucy was named CEO, and the managing partner duties were split between Soucy and Burke. In 2007, the firm founded SPR Europe, a London-based affiliate for the European market. An office was opened in South Africa in 2008 and in New York in 2012.

== Recognition ==
In 2016, co-founder Donna Sokolsky Burke was named one of the Top Women in PR by PR News.

In 2020, SparkPR was recognized by Forbes as one of the nation's top PR agencies for 2021. In total, 200 out of 7,000 PR agencies were named to the list.
