= Navier (company) =

Navier Boat
- Industry: Maritime
- Founded: 2019; 6 years ago in San Francisco Bay Area
- Founder: Sampriti Bhattacharyya
- Headquarters: San Francisco Bay Area, United States
- Website: www.navierboat.com

Navier Boat is an American maritime technology company based in the San Francisco Bay Area. It specializes in designing and manufacturing advanced electric boats and maritime systems, including hydrofoil and hull design, foil control systems, and autonomous navigation.

== History ==
Navier was founded in 2019 by Sampriti Bhattacharyya. In 2021, Paul Bieker, a naval architect known for his work in the America's Cup, joined Navier to lead the development of a hydrofoiling boat.

In February 2022, Navier received $7.2 million in seed funding from a round co-led by Global Founders Capital and Treble. Previously, Navier received over $10 million in seed funding from investors including Sergey Brin, co-founder of Google, Rich Miner, co-founder of Android, and others. Following the seed funding, Navier began building its boats at Lyman-Morse, a shipyard in Maine, using composite components from Rhode Island and other U.S. boating centers. In December 2022, Navier introduced Navier 30, a 30-foot electric hydrofoiling vessel designed with a cruising range of 75 nautical miles.

In May 2023, Navier began a pilot program with Stripe, using the N30 to transport Stripe employees. Navier holds landing rights at Coyote Point Recreation Area, located south of San Francisco International Airport. In October 2023, Elon Musk tested the Navier prototype on the San Francisco Bay.

== Technology ==
Navier produces all-electric boats that glide above the water using a hydrofoil design. These boats combine hydrofoil technology, rechargeable batteries, advanced computer software, and joystick-controlled maneuverability. Its underwater foils lift the hull above the water, reducing hydrodynamic resistance, while joystick operation allows the boat to move sideways and rotate in place. Its software controls the hydrofoils to actively stabilize the ride.

Navier has developed an autonomous docking system that enables docking using autopilot. The boats can be recharged via "shore power."

== Boats ==
- Navier 30
