= Yup Technologies =

Educational technology company

- Type: Privately held
- Industry: Online tutoring
- Founded: San Francisco (2014)
- Founder: Naguib S. Sawiris
- Headquarters: San Francisco, United States
- Area served: United States
- Key people: Naguib S. Sawiris (CEO)
- Website: www.yup.com

Yup (formerly known as MathCrunch) was a San Francisco–based educational technology company that provided on-demand tutoring services for math. The service was provided via a mobile app, which connected tutors with students in real-time. The company was founded in 2014, in San Francisco, by Egyptian billionaire Naguib S. Sawiris, who also acted as the CEO. The company was featured in publications such as Forbes, Fox, VentureBeat, and TechCrunch but shut down sometime in late 2024 or early 2025.

== History ==
Yup (formerly known as MathCrunch) was founded in 2014 in San Francisco by entrepreneur and angel investor Naguib S. Sawiris. The initial idea for the creation of Yup came as Sawiris observed that students were texting friends and family to help them solve homework problems they could not; Sawiris saw an opportunity for both a business and to have a positive social impact in the development of such a service. In May 2015 Yup received $3.5 million in seed funding from venture capital firms Floodgate Fund, Formation 8, Index Ventures, Sherpa Ventures, and Slow Ventures, with the funding intended for expanding the company's reach in students. A few months later, the company announced further funding from Stanford University's StartX Fund, a fund established to provide assistance to Stanford University alumni. That funding was expected to help the company develop its platform's features, and recruit more tutors. In April 2016, MathCrunch rebranded as Yup, offering homework help in chemistry, physics, and math. Yup also announced that they raised another $4 million that will be used to fuel growth. By February 2025, Yup's app and website had been shut down and were no longer accessible.

== Services ==
Yup had developed a mobile app that connected students with live professional tutors, to help them solve homework problems on-demand. The app operated in a chat-like environment – the students snapped a picture of the problem with their mobile devices or wrote out their questions and selected the subject category. Yup matched the problem with available tutors and the selected tutor proceeded to guide the student to solve the problem leveraging chat and pictures to communicate.

=== Topics covered ===
Yup tutors were familiar with, and could explain, every math concept covered by the Common Core from early math to AP Calculus Level AB, including questions in:

Pre-Algebra

- Basic operations (counting, place values, addition, subtraction, multiplication, division); Negative numbers and absolute value (no variables); Factors, divisibility rules, GCF/LCM (no variables); Decimals, fractions, ratios, and proportions (e.g. units, percentages); Exponents and roots (no variables); Order of operations; Grouping (associative, commutative, distributive) and equality (symmetric, reflexive, transitive) properties; Number types (e.g. rational, irrational, complex); Scientific notation; Other pre-algebra (e.g. prime factorization)

Algebra

- Coordinate plane basics (e.g. quadrants, plotting points, distance/midpoint formula); Variables, linear expressions, and solving linear equations; Graphs of lines (e.g. slope, intercepts, y=mx+b); Function properties (e.g. definition of a function, one-to-one/onto, even/odd, domain/range, inverses, composites, direct/inverse variation, piecewise, continuity/interval notation); Inequalities (with variables); Absolute value (with variables); Systems of linear equations; Simplifying monomial and binomial expressions (e.g. factoring/distributing a single term, exponent addition/subtraction); Logarithms, radicals, and exponential functions (with variables); Quadratic expressions, equations, and graphs, Higher polynomial expressions, equations, and graphs; Rational expressions, equations, and graphs; Circle, ellipse, and hyperbola equations and graphs; Function graph transformations (e.g. translating, reflecting, scaling); Complex (a+bi) coordinate systems; Sequences and series; Vectors and matrix basics; Other algebra

Geometry

- Names and properties of figures (e.g. perimeter, area, convex vs. concave); Similarity, scaling, and shape transformations; Congruence; Logic and proofs; Lines and angles; Triangles; Quadrilaterals; Regular Polygons; Circles; 3D solids and polyhedra; Other geometry

Pre-Calculus & Trigonometry

- Basic trigonometric functions and ratios; Trigonometric function graphs; Trigonometric equations and identities; Inverse trigonometric functions; Laws of sines/cosines; Other trigonometry

Basic Stats and Probabilities

- Measures of center and spread; Interpreting/creating plots, graphs, and tables; Permutations, combinations, probability, and expectation; Probability distributions; Linear regression and correlation; Hypothesis testing and confidence intervals; Sampling and surveying; Other statistics

Calculus

- Limits and continuity; Derivatives; Extrema and critical points; Approximating area under curves (e.g. trapezoids, Simpson's rule); Antiderivatives and integrals; Solids and surfaces of integration (e.g. disks, washers); Fundamental theorem of calculus I and II; Mean value theorem, average change, and secants; Basic differential equation behavior (slope fields); Euler's method; Other calculus.

=== Earlier topics supported ===
Yup previously offered support in Physics up to the AP Physics level 1 and 2 and Chemistry up to AP Chemistry.

However, by summer 2018, Yup had removed its science coverage to focus on exclusively tutoring math topics. Additionally, Yup offered a blog with industry specific news for families.

=== Tutor and app details ===
The tutors working with Yup ranged from college students, to high school teachers, to college professors and were scheduled to provide 24/7 coverage. Downloading the app was free of charge. There were several subscription options depending on price point and subscription length. The iOS app twice reached the second position for most downloaded educational app in the United States. Yup was also featured on the Apple Store from April 7- April 21, 2016. Yup's tutoring services were provided to students from elementary school to college. In May 2016 there were over 400,000 registered students, and more than 200,000 tutoring sessions had been completed via the Yup platform.
