= Rare Book Hub =

- Formerly: Americana Exchange
- Company type: Private
- Industry: Retail (Specialty)
- Founded: 2002
- Headquarters: San Francisco, California
- Key people: Bruce McKinney, CEO
- Products: rare books, antiquarian books, out of print books
- Website: rarebookhub.com

The Rare Book Hub (formerly known as the Americana Exchange) is a website for the buying, selling and collecting of rare and antiquarian books. It was founded in 2002 in San Francisco by rare book collector Bruce McKinney with the aim of offering hard to find information about book collecting to the public. From a start of providing a subscription database of bibliographic records, the company now offers many related services, mostly at no charge. The company at first specialized in the Americana book field, but quickly expanded to all types of antiquarian and rare books, ephemera, manuscripts, prints, photographs, and other works on paper.
