= Touch of Modern =

E-commerce website

- Website type: E-commerce
- Available in: English
- Headquarters: San Francisco, California, U.S.
- Website: www.touchofmodern.com
- Launched: March 24, 2012; 14 years ago (as RAVN)

Touch of Modern (aka ToMo) is a members-only e-commerce website and app focused on selling lifestyle products, fashion, and accessories to men. The company is based in San Francisco, California and was launched in March 2012.

== History ==
Touch of Modern was founded by Dennis Liu, Jonathan Wu, Steven Ou, and Jerry Hum in 2012. It was previously known as Skyara; it then became RAVN. The company went through two pivots before the Touch of Modern site was unveiled in 2012. Three months after launching, the website achieved $1M in revenue. Touch of Modern is focused on curation and personalization to differentiate itself from the competition. It is primarily targeted at men with over 70% of its customers being male, the majority of whom purchase through the mobile app.

In August 2012, Fab.com filed a lawsuit against Touch of Modern alleging that Touch of Modern infringed Fab.com's trademarks, trade dress, and copyrights. Fab.com alleged that elements of its site design, including its site's overall look and feel, visual icons and product descriptions, were copied by Touch of Modern. The lawsuit was settled out of court for an undisclosed sum in March 2013.

New ownership, Assignment for the Benefit of Creditors filing and reorganization

On May 14, 2022, ToMo Inc. made a general assignment for the benefit of creditors through MCA Brokerage Services, LLC.. Prior to the Assignment, Multiplier Capital II, had a blanket lien on all assets of ToMo Inc. pursuant to a Loan and Security Agreement dated August 30, 2018. As of May 26, 2022, the unpaid principal balance due under the Loan Agreement, including all fees and accrued interest, was $6,744,957.95. This balance exceeded the value of the assets of ToMo Inc. Multiplier sold its debt under the Loan Agreement to Touch of Modern LLC., a subsidiary of CSC Generation Holdings, Inc. On May 27, 2022, ToMo LLC. used its secured debt to credit bid and purchase (the “Sale”) the assets of ToMo Inc. from the Assignee.

== Funding ==
Touch of Modern raised seed funding from i/o Ventures in 2010 and $3 million Series A from Floodgate Fund and Hillsven Capital in 2013. In 2014, it announced a $14 million Series B funding (via a mix of equity and debt) which was led by Partech Ventures, and included participation from Great Oaks VC, Lucas Venture Group, Silicon Valley Bank, and existing investors, Hillsven and Floodgate, bringing Touch of Modern's total funding to $17 million and followed a year in which the two-year-old company grew its revenue by 400 percent.
