= Olly (company) =

American vitamin supplement company

- Industry: Health
- Founded: 2013
- Founder: Eric Ryan, Brad Harrington
- Headquarters: San Francisco
- Key people: Brad Harrington (CEO)
- Products: Vitamins, protein shakes
- Owner: Unilever (2019–present)
- Website: www.olly.com

Olly (stylized OLLY), also known as Olly Nutrition and Olly Public Benefit, is an American company and brand of vitamin supplements and other products.

== History ==
In 2012, Olly founder Eric Ryan sold his Method company to Ecover.

Olly was founded in 2014. Later, in 2014, Ryan worked with Target on a program that emphasized eco-friendly products. He had trouble selecting a brand for the health & wellness category. Ryan stated that he "couldn't find a worse aisle than the nutritional supplement aisle," calling it "dated and filled with uninspiring brands and mediocre product." Ryan and Harrington both recall being in a store in Boulder, Colorado, where "strangers would just come up to [them] and ask how many milligrams of zinc they should take." Afterwards, the two began brainstorming on an idea for a vitamin company with the aim to "simplify" them and make its focus on "end benefit versus the individual ingredients." Additionally, the brand caters to the millennial cohort.

After meeting with Target executives, Ryan and Olly co-founder Brad Harrington began work on the vitamin company. In April 2015, Olly debuted their first 20 products in Target stores. In its first year operating, the company broke even in its first year. Olly products were sold at Target exclusively in its first year. Instead of focusing on their Olly.com website, the brand "enthusiastically embraced brick-and-mortar retailers as its main selling channel," and would come to be sold at other stores like GNC, CVS, and Albertsons, among others. Unilever acquired Olly in 2019.

In 2021, Olly's headquarters in San Francisco won a San Francisco Design Week award in the Interior Design category.

Olly has been subject to many class action lawsuits, including for claims on its Chillax gummies, Sleep products and for deceptive marketing on its website.

== Manufacturing and packaging ==
Since Olly is focused on providing "ostensible benefits" rather than ingredients, their products combine supplements instead of selling them individually.

Ryan sought a brand that would be user-friendly for the consumers; rather than using "typical round jars" or pills, Ryan employed square containers and gummy vitamins. While most of the vitamins come in gummy form, some products are sold as softgels. "Olly" was chosen as the name of the company as it was neither "pharma-sounding" or "folksy." The packaging of the vitamins was also made to be bright and feature a smiley face on the O in Olly. With focus set to a vitamin's benefits, Olly would emphasize "Restful Sleep" on its packaging, instead of labeling melatonin vitamins as such, for example. Olly vitamins also include higher amounts sugar (up to 4 grams) than other vitamin brands, with Harrington stating, "It's kind of the price you have to pay to make people stay with it every day."

Olly's products are primarily made in Indiana, as well as at some Florida-based facilities.

== Reception and sales ==
In 2016, Harrington stated that 80% of Olly's customers are women, with their women's multivitamin being the company's second-best-selling product. Olly's sleep product is the company's best-selling, as well as Target's best-selling in that respective category. By 2018, Olly was exceeding $100 million annual revenue.

Celebrity hair stylist Christian Wood has mentioned Olly as a "popular option" for hair supplements.

Ryan has been described as a "disruptor" of the vitamins market by media outlets. Harrington has concurred, stating "[Ryan] has spent a lot of time in mass merchants like Target, looking at different categories that might be ripe for disruption."
