= LiquidSpace =

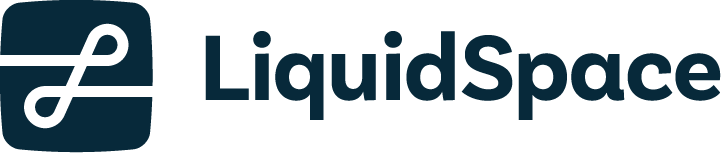
- Type: Private company
- Founded: November 2010
- Founders: Mark Gilbreath
- Headquarters: San Francisco
- Services: Commercial real estate technology
- Website: www.liquidspace.com

LiquidSpace is an online marketplace and workspace network for renting office space.

== History and funding ==
Mark Gilbreath founded LiquidSpace in November 2010. In June 2015, LiquidSpace began listing spaces on month to month terms. In the spring of 2016, LiquidSpace announced plans to reach 100 million square feet of space available in its marketplace.

LiquidSpace has raised over $26 million, with investors and partners including Reid Hoffman of Greylock Partners, Mike Maples Jr. of Floodgate Fund, ROTH Capital Partners, Shasta Ventures, CBRE, Steelcase, and GPT Group.

== Product ==
The LiquidSpace product is available on the web, and as a location-based app on Android and iPhone app.
