= Zinc Inc. =

American mobile messaging company, 2013–2019

Zinc Inc (since Jun 2016, formerly Cotap Inc)
- Type: Incorporated
- Industry: Mobile messaging
- Founded: May 2013
- Founder: Jim Patterson and Zack Parker
- Headquarters: San Francisco, US
- Area served: Global
- Website: zinc.it

Zinc Inc. (formerly Cotap Inc., renamed June 2016) was a San Francisco-based enterprise mobile messaging company. Its application was aimed at businesses and, unlike consumer-focused services such as WhatsApp and WeChat that require phone numbers, allowed users to find and message colleagues by corporate email domain. ServiceMax acquired Zinc in 2019 for an undisclosed amount. The company was founded in May 2013 by former Yammer executives Jim Patterson and Zack Parker. That month, Cotap announced it had received $5.5 million in a Series A funding round from Charles River Ventures and Emergence Capital Partners. Cotap received $10M in Series B funding in January 2014.

Cotap released its first app, which is available for iOS, in October 2013. In February 2014 Cotap released a native Android app. In August 2014, Cotap released a Mac and Web app alongside the announcement of cloud storage integrations with Box, Dropbox, Google Drive and OneDrive. Both iOS and Android apps, as well as the Mac and Web apps, allow users to send individual and group messages.

On raising $5M in a funding round led by Emergence Capital Partners and Charles River Ventures, Cotap changed its name to Zinc and appointed a new Chief Executive, Stacey Epstein.

In April 2017 a further $11M round of investment was raised from GE Ventures, Hearst Ventures and existing investors Emergence & Charles River.

The acquisition by ServiceMax in 2019 was completed for an undisclosed amount.
