= Linqto =

American investment platform company

- Type: Private
- Industry: fintech, financial services
- Founded: 2010
- Founders: Bill Sarris, Vicki Sarris
- Headquarters: San Jose, California
- Key people: Joe Endoso (CEO)
- Website: www.linqto.com

Linqto is a San Francisco Bay Area-based investment platform that allows accredited investors to invest in private-market startups and pre-IPO companies. It has users in 110 countries. In 2024, the company was set to go public on the NASDAQ, but the deal subsequently fell through.

== History ==
Linqto was founded in 2010 husband-and-wife team, Bill Sarris, formerly a financial services architect at Intuit and Vicki Sarris, a former biologist.

In 2016 Linqto partnered with fintech firm, Leverage, and nine credit unions to launch a pilot program for the Leverage app store. The store is powered by Linqto's Otter platform, through which financial institutions select and brand fintech apps for app stores Apple, Android, and Amazon.

In 2018 Linqto partnered with Keiretsu Forum to build the Keiretsu Connect app that connects accredited investors from 53 chapters across 26 countries on 4 continents and allows them to view curated deals from all over the world. In September, Linqto launched the WIB Apps Store, a platform for banks to provide mobile financial technology apps to their customers. Linqto's automated delivery platform allows banks to select and brand fintech apps, makes them available for internal testing, and distributes them to app stores Apple, Google, and Amazon.

In March 2019 Greg Kidd of Hard Yaka Inc invested $1M into Linqto to fund the exploration of strategic partnership opportunities with Hard Yaka entities including Globalid.

In April 2020, Linqto hosted the inaugural Global Investor Conference in collaboration with Keiretsu Connect, bringing together expert advice to discuss digital opportunities during COVID-19. In 2020, Linqto launched the Linqto Trading Platform for accredited investors.

In August 2022, Linqto acquired Trustline to build a decentralized exchange for private market securities.

In November 2022 FINRA granted Linqto is its broker-dealer license for secondary trading of equity securities. In March 2023, Linqto surpassed $200M in total member investments. The company announced plans for public listing directly on the NASDAQ in September 2024.

On July 8, 2025, Linqto filed for Chapter 11 bankruptcy protection after facing alleged security violations. CEO Dan Siciliano noted that the company was facing "serious defects in the corporate formation, structure, and operation of the business that raise questions about what customers actually own," and that it faced "potentially insurmountable operating challenges." The company has secured $60 million in debtor-in-possession financing from Sandton Capital Partners as part of its proceedings.

=== Products ===
Linqto's self-directed investment platform has no fees and investment minimums are $5,000 for first-time and subsequent investments.

Linqto deploys special purpose vehicles (SPVs) on its investment platform for investors to buy and sell equity in private technology companies. Linqto uses SPVs because it is a separate company that is bankruptcy remote, allowing members to invest without needing to get on the cap table of each private company they invest in.

== See also ==
- Special Purpose Vehicle
- Keiretsu Forum
