= Double Rainbow (ice cream) =

Brand of ice cream

- Company type: Subsidiary
- Industry: Foods
- Founded: 1976
- Founder: Michael Sachar and Steven Fink
- Headquarters: San Francisco, California, United States
- Website: www.doublerainbow.com

Double Rainbow is an American brand of premium ice cream, sorbets, and frozen desserts based in San Francisco, California. Founded in 1976 by two childhood friends, the company has remained a family-owned and operated business for over 40 years. The company distributes locally and nationally at retail stores and grocery outlets nationwide. Dubbed as "The Official Ice Cream of San Francisco" by former Mayor Willie Brown, Double Rainbow has won numerous awards, including "Grand Champion" at the World Dairy Expo. Manufactured products include dairy, non-dairy, and soy-based products. All of their ice creams are certified Kosher by the Orthodox Union.

== Information ==
Double Rainbow was originally founded by Michael Sachar and Steven Fink, two childhood friends from Brooklyn. As kids, they would sell frozen popsicles on the beaches of Coney Island, with the dream of one day opening their own ice cream parlor. On September 28, 1976, they signed their first lease for their first ice cream shop on Castro Street. On that same day, a double rainbow lit up the San Francisco sky, and the name was born.

In 1982, Double Rainbow won the top prize in the "Great American Lick-Off."

The company offers more than 60 flavors in pint, quart, and 2.5 gallon tubs. Seasonal flavors include Pumpkin, Peppermint Cookie Crunch, Eggnog.

Manufacturing took place in the heart of San Francisco's mission district for over 40 years. In 2019, manufacturing re-located to Emeryville, CA.

== Misc ==
Double Rainbow distributes to large grocery chains including Safeway and Whole Foods. Their Castro Street location was a neighborhood fixture during the heart of the 70s and 80s. In November 2020 Double Rainbow returned to San Francisco's Castro District opening an ice cream scoop shop close to where the original stood. This location closed on March 31, 2025.
