= Twist and Shout, Inc. =

Former American software company

- Industry: Software
- Founded: 2011
- Defunct: April 1, 2014
- Headquarters: San Francisco, California
- Products: Twist (mobile application)

Twist and Shout, Inc. was an American software company based in San Francisco, California and founded in 2011. Its main product was a mobile application called Twist which allowed users to share their estimated time of arrival (ETA) and real-time GPS location while traveling.

Twist closed its doors on April 1, 2014.

== History ==
Twist and Shout, Inc. was founded by Bill Lee, Mike Belshe, Frank VanZile and Edward Marks. Twist and Shout, Inc. collected $6 million in venture capital funds from Bridgescale Partners, Eric Hahn, Jeff Skoll, Bill Lee and Mike Belshe.

== Corporate ==
Twist and Shout's advisors included David Sacks, CEO of Yammer, Matthew Cowan, Bridgescale Partners Managing Director, and Eric Hahn, Inventures Group Partner. The Twist website and mobile application team included engineers from MIT, Apple, Google and Stanford.

== Products ==
The concept for the mobile application called Twist, came from co-founder and CEO Bill Lee. Twist adjusted to user transportation modes such as driving, public transit or walking, and allowed private sharing of estimated arrival times with others. Twist functioned on a user's phone and integrated with their calendar, contacts, email, chat and Google Map features. Twist incorporated traffic conditions into its arrival time calculations. The service was free and was advertisement-free. It was available in the United States, Canada, Australia and the United Kingdom, and was compatible with both iPhones and Android phones.
