= Traction (agency) =

American interactive advertising agency

- Industry: Advertising, Marketing, Design, Interactive, Media, Strategy
- Founded: 2001
- Headquarters: San Francisco, CA, United States
- Area served: Global
- Key people: Founders: Adam Kleinberg, Theo Fanning, Paul Giese
- Number of employees: 40 employees
- Website: www.tractionco.com

Traction is an interactive advertising agency based in San Francisco. In 2014, they were named Independent Agency of the Year in the iMedia Agency Awards. Their clients include Alibaba.com, Adobe Systems, Bank of America, Cabot Creamery, California Bank & Trust, Camelbak, Intuit, Intel, Kelly-Moore Paints, Livescribe, Meebo, Robert Half International, Salesforce.com, SAP, and Shutterfly, Walmart, ZoneAlarm.

== History ==
The agency was founded in 2001 as Traction Corporation by Adam Kleinberg, Paul Giese, Theo Fanning, and Michele Turner. The founding partners had previously worked together at Think New Ideas, a new media pioneer with heavy investments from Omnicom. Michele Turner left the company in 2009.

In 2006, Traction Corporation started a creative staffing agency called SubTraction. In 2009, Traction acquired 8 Speed Multimedia, a provider of dynamic media.

The agency broadened its services to include Media in 2013.

== Awards and recognition ==
=== 2008 ===
- Selected by Adobe Systems to be featured in an original documentary series “Designing Minds” showcasing creative leaders of the design industry with a view into the creative forces behind the shows, ads, and products people use every day.

=== 2009 ===
- Awarded BtoB Magazine "Interactive Agency of the Year"
- Inc. 5000 - Ranked #1,399
- #51 on the list of "Fastest Growing Companies in the Bay Area".
- Named "Social Media Agency To Watch" by iMediaConnection

=== 2010 ===
- Awarded BtoB Magazine “Top Interactive Agency of the Year - Runner-up”
- Inc. 5000 - Ranked #1217

=== 2011 ===
- Awarded BtoB Magazine "Top Interactive Agency of the Year - Runner-up"
- iMediaConnection named Traction blog among “5 agency blogs you should be reading”

=== 2012 ===
- Focus.com "5 Agencies Built for Technology Marketing"
- The Next Web "10 small agencies that define 'Digital Spring' in San Francisco"

=== 2013 ===
- Awarded BtoB Magazine "Top Interactive Agency"
- Awarded "AdAge Small Agency of the Year: West Region/Silver"
- San Francisco Business Times "Fastest Growing Companies in the Bay Area"
- Agency Post's 2013 Agency 100
- iMedia Small Agency of the Year - Finalist
- Digiday Best Brand Campaign, B2B - Winner
- Digiday Best Video Campaign, B2B - Winner

=== 2015 ===
- iMedia Small Agency of the Year - Finalist

=== 2016 ===
- iMedia Small Agency of the Year - Finalist
- BMA Small Agency of the Year - Finalist

=== 2017 ===
- launched Live Suite for delivering a live video stream across many sites.

== Notable campaigns ==
- “Real or Fake?” Adobe Systems - One of Adobe's most successful social media campaigns was developed by Traction, geared toward driving engagement to their new CS products. This campaign has been featured in a number of articles, including being featured as a case study by Facebook.
- “Never miss a word.” Livescribe - Traction introduced the Livescribe Smartpen to the college market.
- “Find it. Make it. Sell it.” Alibaba.com - Traction launched a $30 million campaign for China's largest online retailer, Alibaba.com, in the U.S.
